= Otay Mountain Wilderness =

Protected wilderness area in California, United States

- IUCN category V (protected landscape/seascape)
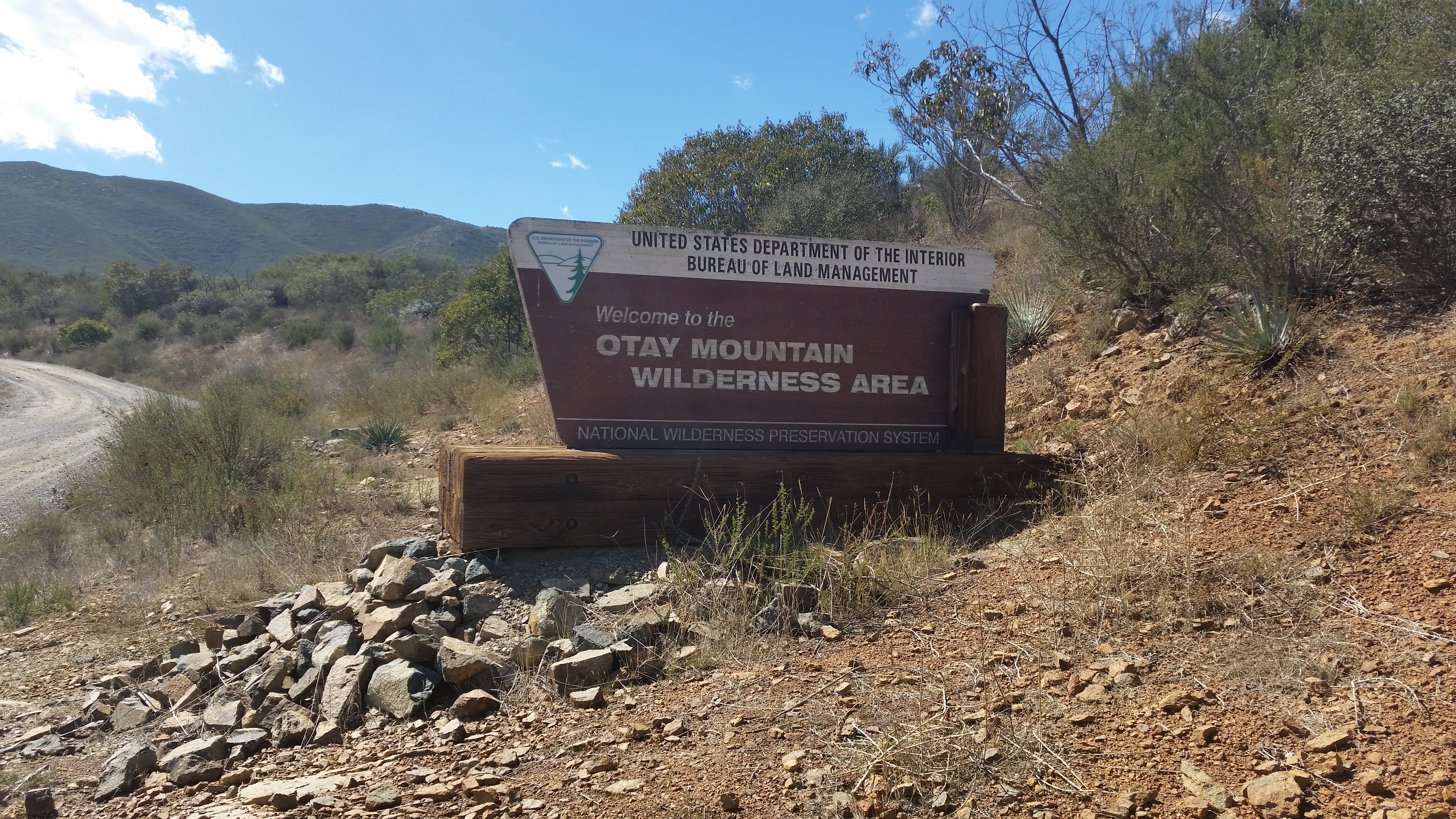
- BLM sign on Otay Mountain Truck Trail

- Location within San Diego County, California Location within California Location within the United States
- Location: San Diego County, United States
- Nearest city: Otay Mesa
- Coordinates: 32°35′40″N 116°50′40″W
- Area: 16,885 acres (6,833 ha)
- Established: 1999
- Governing body: Bureau of Land Management

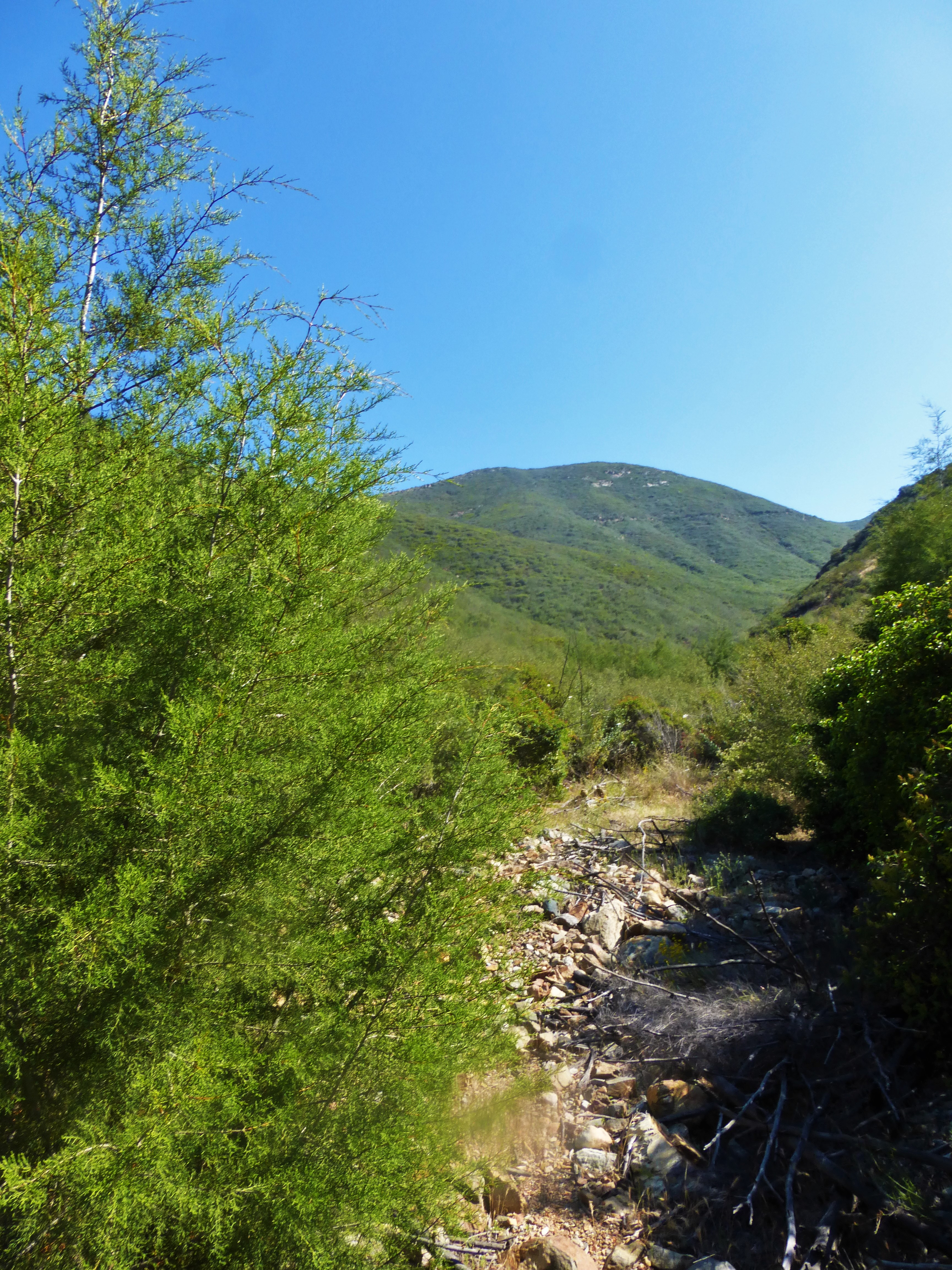
Tecate cypress in the Otay Mountain Wilderness

The Otay Mountain Wilderness is a U.S. wilderness area in San Diego County, California, 12 miles east of the community of Otay Mesa and just north of the Mexico–United States border. Some parts of the wilderness area rise quickly from sea level, reaching a peak of just over 3,500 feet (1,100 m) at the summit of Otay Mountain.

Wilderness status was conferred on October 7, 1998, effectively preserving 18,500 acres under protection of the Wilderness Act, a component of the National Wilderness Preservation System. The legislation was signed by President Bill Clinton on December 11, 1999. The wilderness is managed by the Bureau of Land Management.

== Geography ==
The wilderness lies in the San Ysidro Mountains, of which Otay Mountain is the highest summit at 3,566 feet (1,087 m). The mountain, and its immediate surroundings, are extremely rugged and include steep, often precipitous, canyon walls and hills.

The public lands within the Otay Mountain Wilderness are one of the last remaining pristine locations in western San Diego County. Adjacent to the Mexican border, it is internationally known for its diversity of unique and sensitive plants. The area plays a critical role in San Diego's multi-species conservation plan.

== Natural history ==
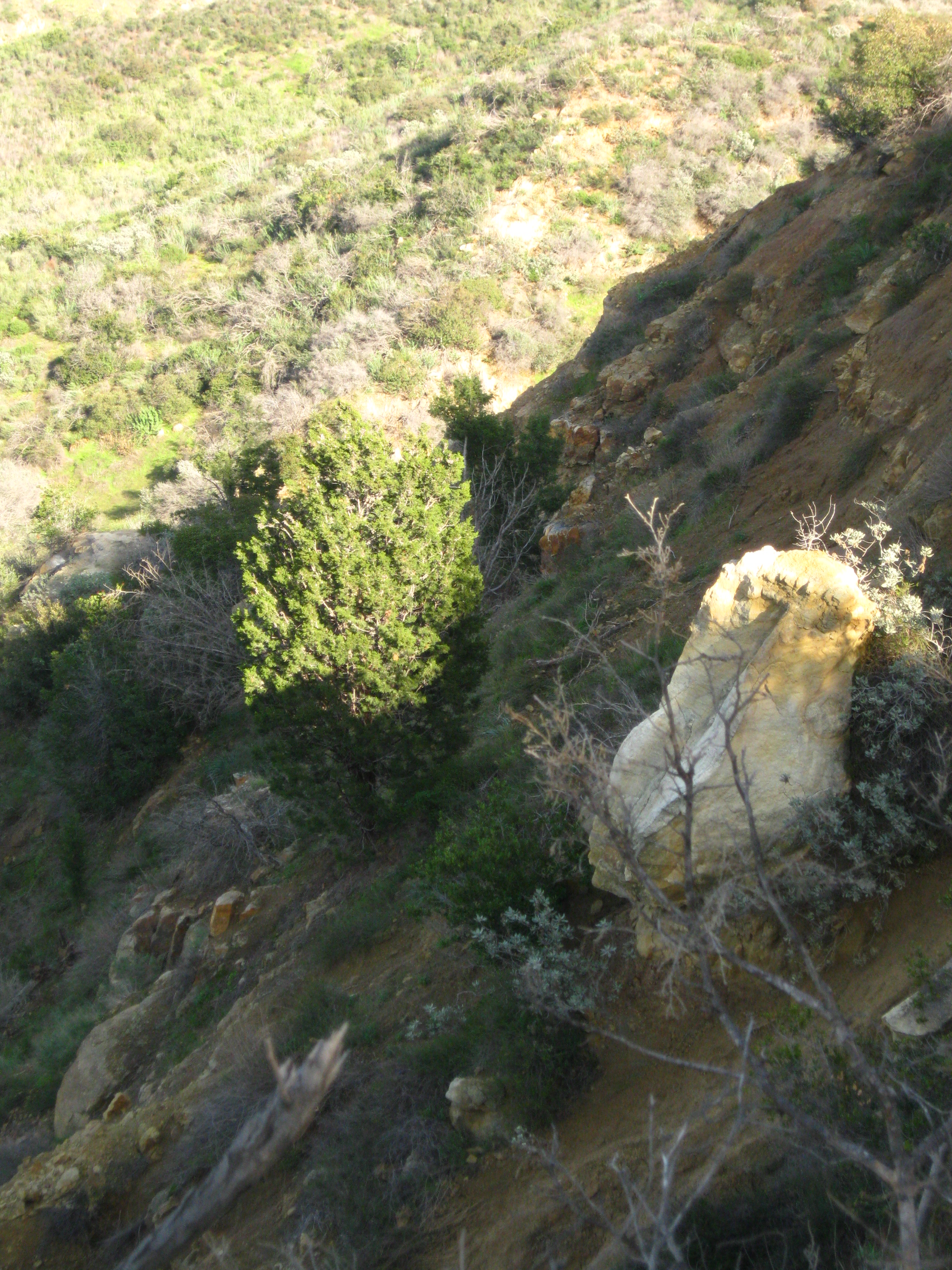
Tecate cypress

The San Ysidro Mountains are remnants of a chain of ancient volcanoes from which meta-volcanic soils form, sustaining a diverse chaparral community dominated by chamise (Adenostoma fasciculatum), mixed chaparral and coastal sagebrush habitats.

=== Flora ===
The world's largest stand of Tecate cypress (Cupressus forbesii) are found at the Otay Mountain Wilderness, as are at least 15 plant species that are candidates for federal listing as threatened or endangered species. In all 37 plant species found on Otay Mountain are listed as sensitive by the California Native Plant Society, at least five, including the Tecate cypress, occur only on Otay Mountain or in the immediate area.

Particularly important species include:

- Cleveland's monkeyflower (Mimulus clevelandii)
- Mexican flannelbush (Fremontodendron mexicanum)
- Otay Mountain lotus (Lotus crassifolius var. otayensis)
- Southern mountain misery (Chamaebatia australis)
- San Miguel savory (Clinopodium chandleri)
- Gander's pitcher sage (Lepechinia ganderi)

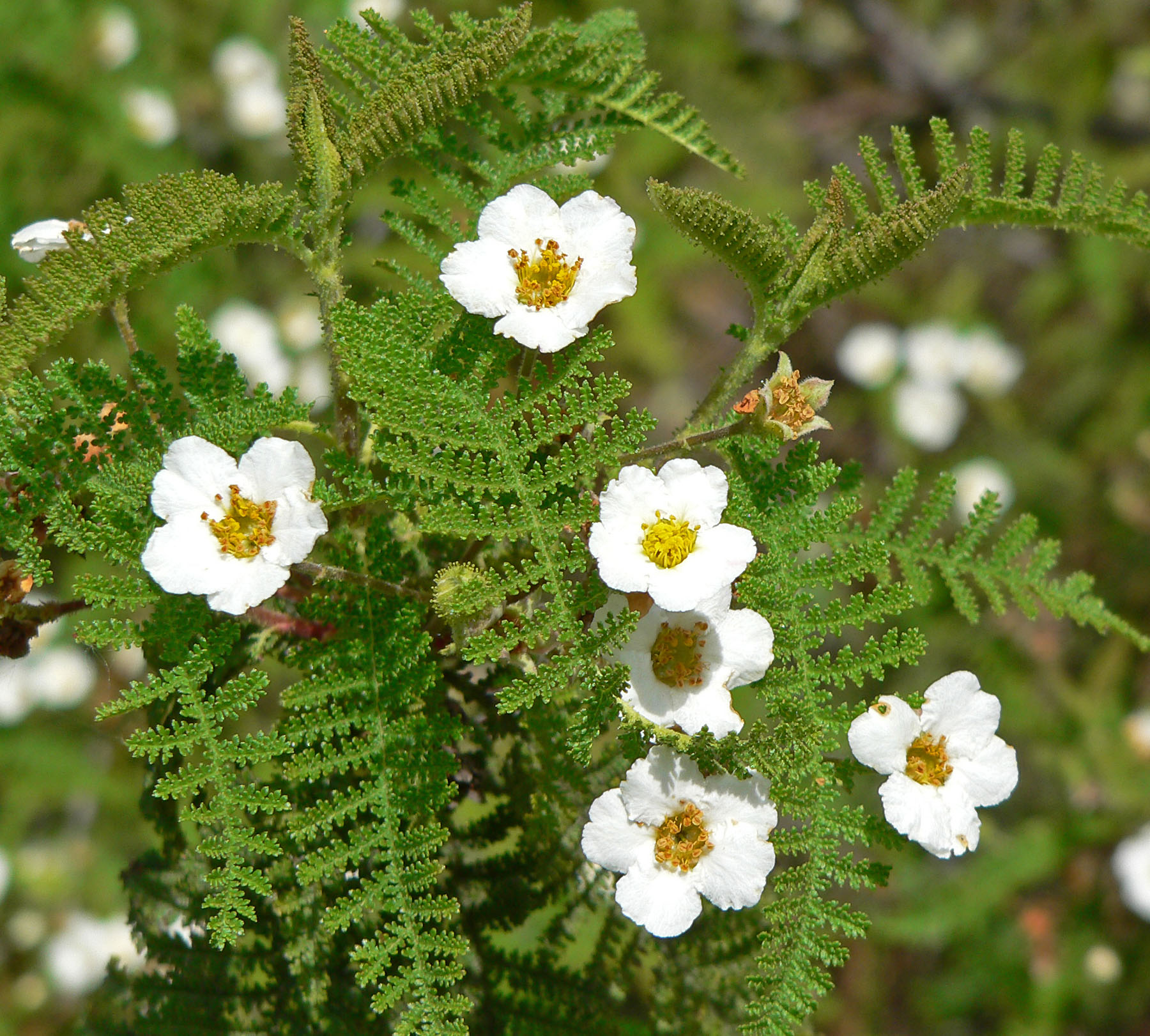
Southern mountain misery

==== Endangered species ====
- San Diego thorn-mint (Acanthomintha ilicifolia)
- Parish's button-celery (Eryngium aristulatum var. parishii)
- Otay tarweed (Hemizonia conjugens)
- Dehesa bear-grass (Nolina interrata)

==== Rare species ====
- Dunn's mariposa (Calochortus dunnii)
- Slender-pod squaw cabbage (Caulanthus stenocarpus)
- Mexican fremontia (Fremontodendron mexicanum)
- Gander butterweed (Senecio ganderi)

=== Fauna ===
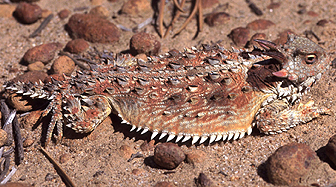
Coast horned lizard

The diversity of habitats within the wilderness area maintains a variety of indigenous fauna, including a number of rare or endangered species. The most numerous large animal is the mule deer.

Species of special concern on Otay Mountain include:

- California gnatcatcher
- Orange-throated whiptail
- Coast horned lizard

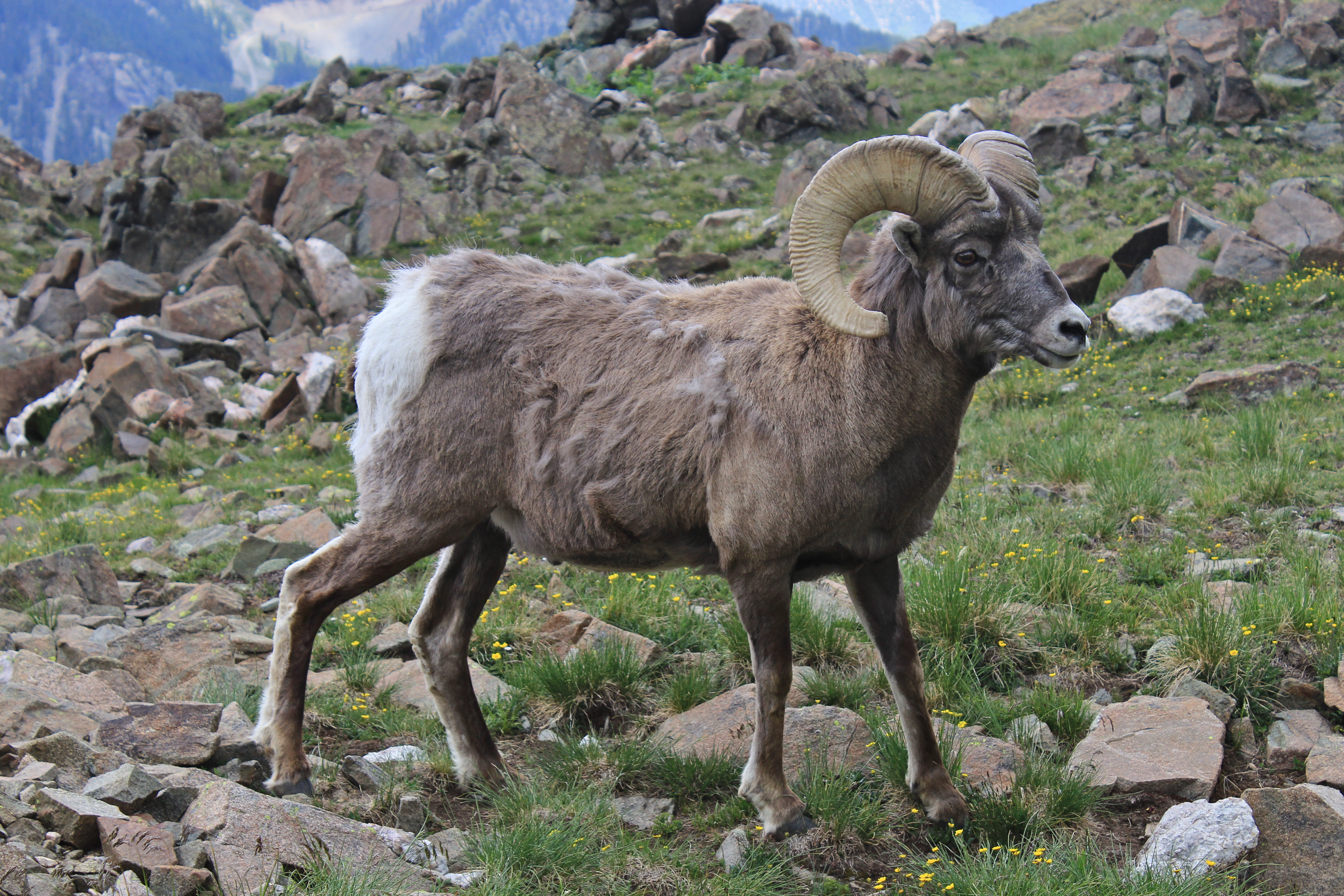
Bighorn sheep

==== Endangered species ====
- Bighorn sheep
- Quino checkerspot butterfly
- The arroyo toad, resident of the Tijuana river, is affected by erosion occurring on the Tijuana watershed, within the wilderness area, which causes silting of its habitat.

==== Protected species ====
- Mountain lion
- Southern bald eagle

== Border wall ==
In the mid 1990s, as part of Operation Gatekeeper, Department of Homeland Security contractors began to build a border wall, and associated access roads. The initial phase of wall building extended from San Diego only as far as the foothills of Otay Mountain.

An environmental impact statement carried out prior to a waiver of an environmental law, required to allow construction within the wilderness area, concluded that the work on the border wall would have long-term impacts on plant, animal and water courses within the area. Grading and construction of roads in the wilderness area would result in removal of layers of topsoil and delicate, intertwined root systems that protect dry chaparral habitat from erosion. The wall itself disrupts the ability of migratory animals, like the javelina, to roam freely across its natural range. In December 2008 work began to continue the wall's progress through the wilderness area, under the auspices of the Secure Fence Act of 2006.

== See also ==
- List of U.S. Wilderness Areas
- Mexico–United States barrier
- National Landscape Conservation System
- Wilderness Act

== Notes ==
IUCN category obtained from Protected Planet: Otay Mountain State Ecological Reserve entry. Retrieved March 7, 2015.
