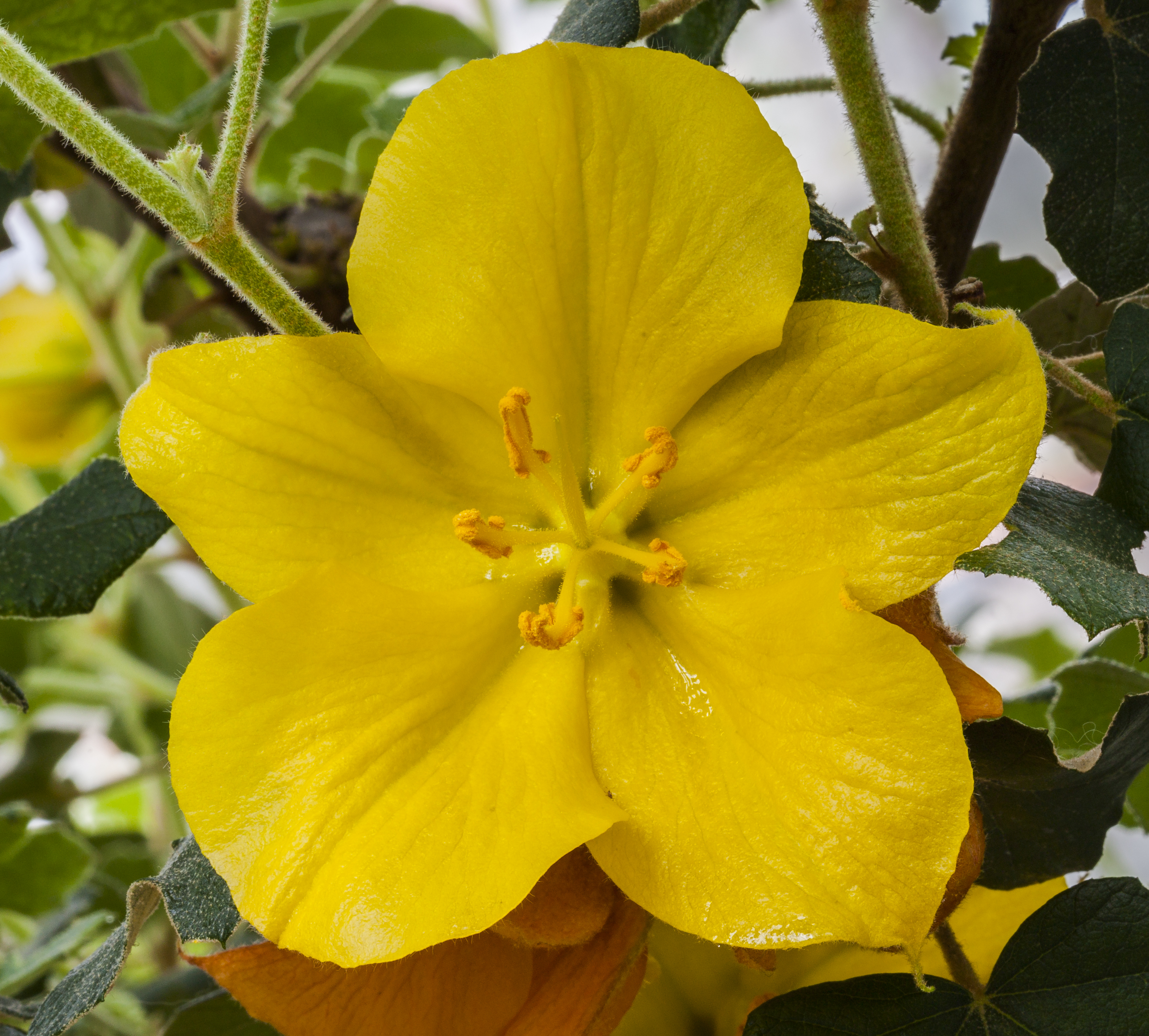

Conservation status
- Apparently Secure (NatureServe)

Scientific classification
- Kingdom: Plantae
- Clade: Tracheophytes
- Clade: Angiosperms
- Clade: Eudicots
- Clade: Rosids
- Order: Malvales
- Family: Malvaceae
- Genus: Fremontodendron
- Species: F. californicum

Binomial name
- Fremontodendron californicum Coville
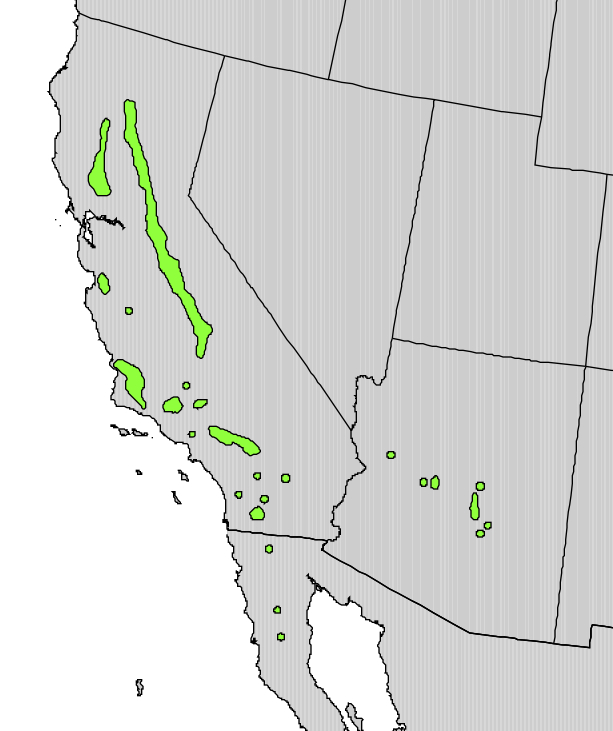
- Natural range

Synonyms
- Fremontia californica Torr.

= Fremontodendron californicum =

Species of shrub

Fremontodendron californicum, with the common names California flannelbush, California fremontia, and flannel bush, is a flowering shrub native to diverse habitats in southwestern North America.

== Description ==
The plant is a flowering evergreen hardwood shrub or small multi-trunked tree, growing from 2.4–5.5 metres (8–18 ft) in height and 1.8–3.0 m (6–10 ft) in width.

The 1–5 cm (3/8–2 in) leaves are olive to gray−green, fuzzy and flannel-like, palmately to pinnately lobed. The hairs covering the leaves are easily brushed off in human contact, and can be a skin and eye irritant. The bottom sides of the leaves are distinct with a velvety brown coating.

The large flowers are 3.5–6 cm (1 1/2–2 1/4 in) in diameter, a rich yellow, sometimes with orange, coppery, or reddish margins surrounding the base. Their blossoms are borne in great showy masses, and tend to bloom one at a time. Each petal has an attractive, curved shape that comes to a point.

== Taxonomy ==
Fremontodendron californicum is one of three species in the genus Fremontodendron, the others being F. mexicanum and F. decumbens.

=== Former subspecies ===
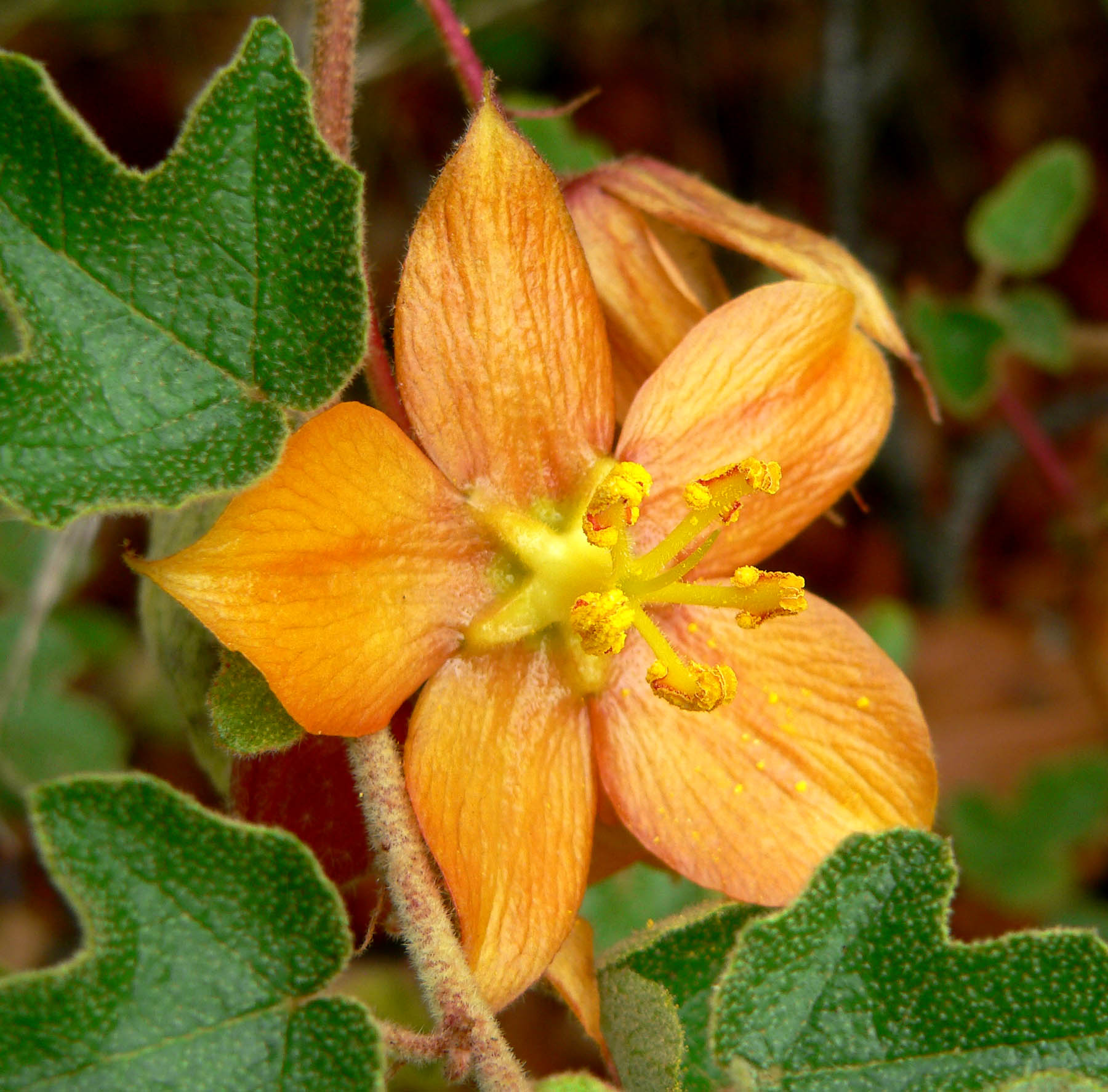
Fremontodendron decumbens – Pine Hill flannelbush

Subspecies have formerly included:

- Fremontodendron californicum ssp. decumbens – Pine Hill flannelbush: reclassified as Fremontodendron decumbens (R. Lloyd).

A decumbent and low spreading form, 0.91 m (3 ft) in height and 1.8 m (6 ft) in width, has yellow-orange flowers, and is endemic to the Sierra Nevada foothills, nearly all of the individuals of this subspecies are found in the Pine Hill Ecological Reserve in El Dorado County. In nature it only grows in metal-rich gabbro soil, a red weathered soil of volcanic origin. It requires fire for seed germination, but as the nature reserve is near human settlements fire ecology is suppressed. It is a federally listed endangered species.

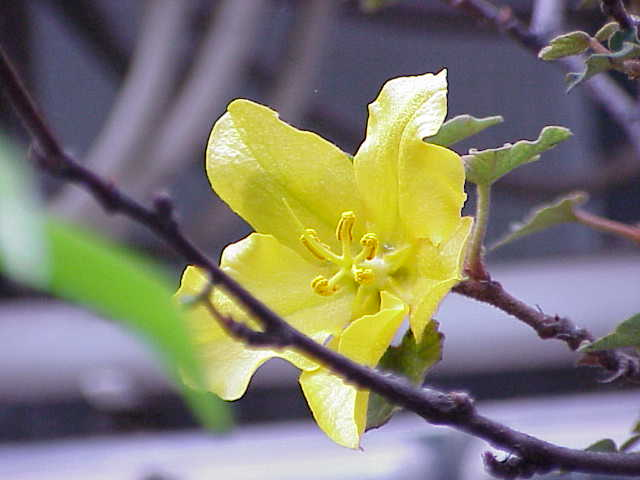
F. californicum (ssp. napensis) – Napa Fremontia

- Fremontodendron californicum ssp. californicum – California fremontia: now reclassified as the species, Fremontodendron californicum.
- Fremontodendron californicum ssp. napensis – Napa Fremontia: The current Jepson does not recognize this subspecies, using Fremontodendron californicum, but the form is different enough that it is horticulturally recognized by this name. It is typically smaller and more open in form than the species, with much smaller leaves and flowers. It grows 1.8–4.6 m (6–15 ft) in height and 1.2–3.7 m (4–12 ft) in width.

=== Etymology ===
Fremontodendron is named for Major General John Charles Frémont (1813–90), an explorer of western North America. Californicum means 'from California'. Dendron means 'tree'.

== Distribution and habitat ==
Fremontodendron californicum is found in numerous habitats across California at elevations of 400–1,980 m (1,300–6,500 ft), especially California chaparral and woodlands, Yellow Pine Forests, and Pinyon-juniper woodlands along the eastern San Joaquin Valley. It is found along the eastern San Joaquin Valley in the western foothills of the Sierra Nevada in chalky, sandy, nutritionally poor soils; on the east slope Cascade Range foothills of the northwest Sacramento Valley and the Klamath Mountains to the west; the California Coast Ranges throughout the state; the Transverse Ranges, and the Peninsular Ranges.

It is also found in small, isolated populations in the mountains of central and western Arizona, in the Arizona transition zone-Mogollon Rim region, primarily in the Mazatzal Mountains and Superstition Mountains. It is also found from central to northern Baja California state, in isolated chaparral locales in the Peninsular Ranges.

== Cultivation ==
Fremontodendron californicum is cultivated as an ornamental plant by specialty plant nurseries, for planting in native plant, drought tolerant, and wildlife gardens, and in natural landscaping and habitat restoration projects.

Cultivated plants need good drainage, and no supplemental summer water when established. Fremontodendron californicum ssp. decumbens is the most garden tolerant of all Fremontia, and can also be used in large pots and planters.

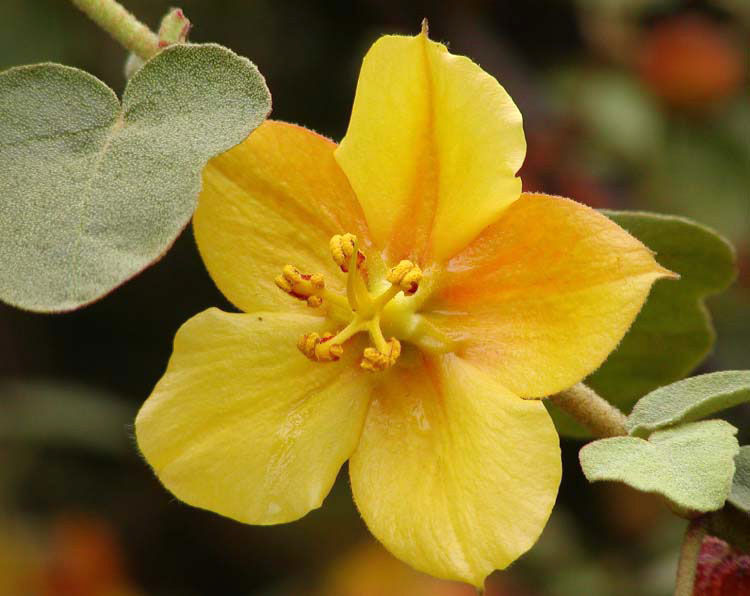
'Ken Taylor' (F. californicum X F. mexicanum)

=== Hybrids ===
There are several named hybrids of Fremontodendron californicum and F. mexicanum in the horticultural trade, they include:

- Fremontodendron 'California Glory' — lemon-yellow flowers with a reddish tinge, grows 6.1 m (20 ft) in height by 6.1 m (20 ft) in width. It is the winner of the Award of Garden Merit from the California Horticultural Society in 1965, and received a First Class Certificate from the Royal Horticultural Society in 1967.
- Fremontodendron 'Ken Taylor' — golden flowers with a darker orange outside petals in the spring and summer, and grows to only 1.5 m (5 ft) in height by 2.4–3.0 m (8–10 ft) in width.
- Fremontodendron 'Dara's Gold' — golden flowers over a long period from late winter through early summer, grows 0.91 m (3 ft) in height by 1.8–2.4 m (6–8 ft) in width. A hybrid between Fremontodendron decumbens and Fremontodendron mexicanum.
- Fremontodendron 'San Gabriel' — 3.0–5.5 m (10–18 ft) in height by 2.4–3.7 m (8–12 ft) in width, suitable for an espalier.

== Uses ==
As a traditional Native American medicinal plant, the inner bark's sap that was used as a topical remedy for mucous membrane irritation and for gastrointestinal upset, by some of the indigenous peoples of California. The wood was also used by the Californian Yokuts and Kawaiisu peoples as a building and furniture material, and the bark for cordage and for nets used in acorn cache holding and snare hunting. It contributed cultural significance as Indigenous communities utilized the flexible nature of the wood to craft hoop-and-pole game materials.
