= Machesna Mountain Wilderness =

Protected wilderness area in California, United States

Machesna Mountains Wilderness
- IUCN category Ib (wilderness area)
- Location within California Location within the United States
- Interactive map of Machesna Mountains Wilderness
- Location: San Luis Obispo County, California
- Nearest city: San Luis Obispo, California, US
- Coordinates: 35°16′43″N 120°13′51″W
- Area: 19,882 acres (80.46 km^{2})
- Designated: September 28, 1984
- Governing body: U.S. Forest Service / Bureau of Land Management

Machesa Mountain Wilderness is a 19,882 acres (80.46 km^{2}) wilderness area in the La Panza Range of San Luis Obispo County, California 25 miles east of San Luis Obispo. It is dually administered by the United States Forest Service and the Bureau of Land Management and was protected in 1984 by the California Wilderness Act. The American Canyon Research Natural Area is inside the wilderness, established to study a strain of Coulter pine.

== Botany ==
Aside from Coulter pine, over 239 plant species make their home in the wilderness, including coast live oak, blue oak, canyon live oak, Palmer's mariposa lily, Fremont's cottonwood, Sidalcea hickmanii, and death camas.
