= QAH =

Qah or QAH can refer to:

- Qah, a village in northwestern Syria
- Hindon Airport, an airport in Ghaziabad, Uttar Pradesh, India, by IATA code
- Queen Alexandra Hospital, a hospital in Portsmouth, England, U.K.
- Quick Airways Holland, an airline from the Netherlands, by ICAO code; see List of defunct airlines of the Netherlands
- Quantum anomalous Hall effect, another name for the quantum Hall effect
- Amarizana language, an extinct language spoken in Colombia, by Language List code

== See also ==
- QA (disambiguation)
- Kah (disambiguation)
- CAH (disambiguation)
- QAHS (disambiguation)
