= Kah =

Kah or KAH may refer to:

- Kah, the Apache version of Moccasin game
- Kah Rural District, Iran
- Kimberly Ann Hart
- KAH, the Telegraph code for Suzhou Industrial Park railway station, Jiangsu, China
- KA·h or kiloampere-hour, a unit of electric charge
- Fer language, a language spoken in the Central African Republic
- Qah, a village in northern Syria

== See also ==
- QAH (disambiguation)
