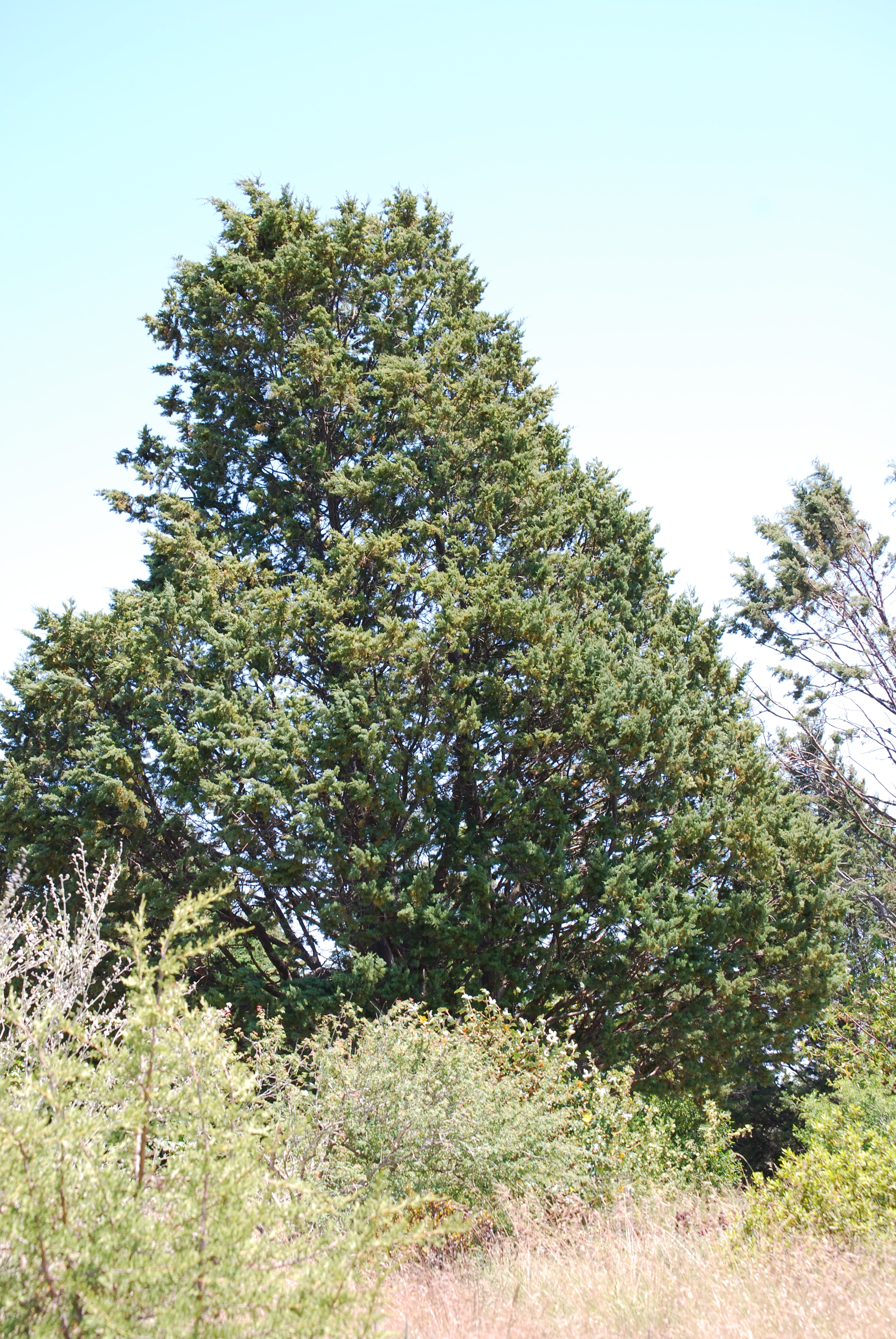

Conservation status
- Endangered (IUCN 3.1)

Scientific classification
- Kingdom: Plantae
- Clade: Tracheophytes
- Clade: Gymnosperms
- Division: Pinophyta
- Class: Pinopsida
- Order: Cupressales
- Family: Cupressaceae
- Genus: Hesperocyparis
- Species: H. guadalupensis

Binomial name
- Hesperocyparis guadalupensis (S.Watson) Bartel
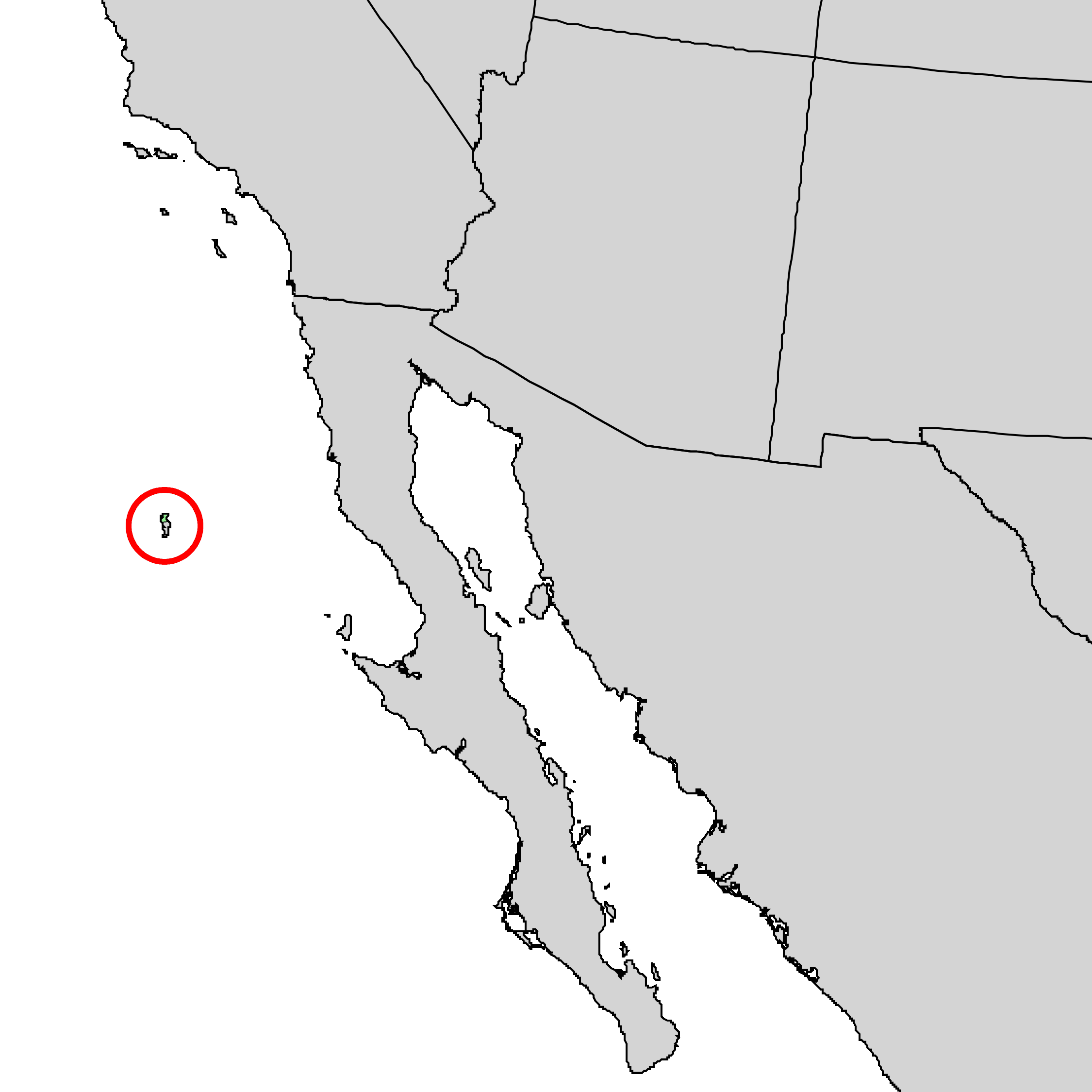
- Natural range
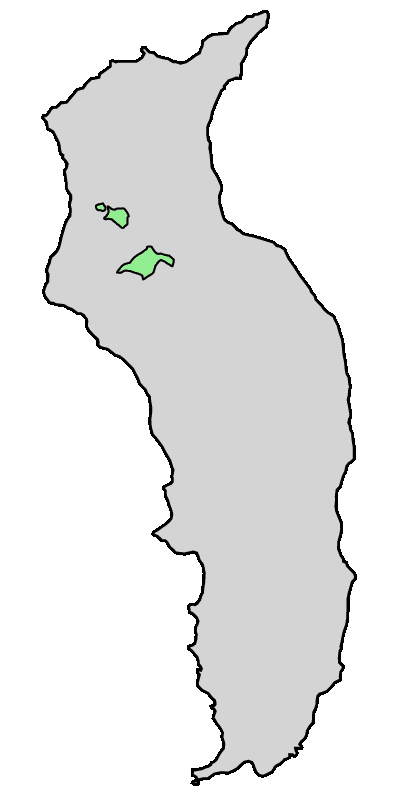
- Guadalupe Island

Synonyms
- Callitropsis guadalupensis (S.Watson) D.P.Little (2006); Cupressus guadalupensis S.Watson (1879); Cupressus macrocarpa var. guadalupensis (S.Watson) Mast. (1896); Neocupressus guadalupensis (S.Watson) de Laub. (2009)

= Hesperocyparis guadalupensis =

Island endemic species of western cypress tree

Hesperocyparis guadalupensis, the Guadalupe cypress, is a species of conifer in the cypress family, Cupressaceae, endemic to Guadalupe Island in the Pacific Ocean off the western coast of Mexico's Baja Peninsula. It is a medium-sized tree with fine green to blue-green foliage. In its native habitat it depends on water from the fogs that envelop high ground in the northern half of the island.

It became an endangered species due to feral goats living on Guadalupe Island that – for more than a century – prevented new trees from growing. In 2005 the goats were finally removed from the tree's island home as part of an island restoration project. New trees are growing and other plants are beginning to recover, though the future of the species is not yet assured. Guadalupe cypress is closely related to the vulnerable Tecate cypress, which grows on the mainland of Baja California and southern California. It is used as an ornamental tree in Mediterranean climates, particularly in Europe, but has no other significant human uses.

== Description ==
Guadalupe cypress is a coniferous tree with a dome-shaped and broad crown when fully mature. The species is variable in size, with mature trees reaching 12–20 metres (39–66 ft) tall, though they are noted as being towards the lower end of this range in their native habitat in the 2000s. The first scientific description recorded them as growing to "40 feet high or more". The bark of the tree is fairly smooth, but thin layers will peel off the trunk. The color of the bark may range from cherry-red to dull gray brown. The bark of the larger branches is of similar texture and color as the trunk.

In the first year a new shoot will be yellow-green to brown. The foliage grows in dense sprays, dark blue-green or glaucous blue in color. The leaves are scale-like, 1.5–2 millimeters long, in four rows on rounded (not flattened) shoots. The texture of the foliage is soft; when crushed, it has a light resinous aroma. The leaf scales are not shed from the branchlets, but instead the entire small twig is shed after two to three years. The branchlets on the ends of branches may reach a length of 2–3 centimeters, but will only be 1 millimeter thick.

The seed cones are nearly spherical, with eight to ten horn-shaped scales, narrow at the base and wide at the top, with a pointed tip. They measure 3–3.5 centimeters in diameter. They are green during growth and ripen to be gray-brown or brown. Inside the cone are approximately 70 to 100 seeds, brown with a light waxy coating described by botanists as glaucous. The seeds are much larger than those of other western cypress trees, weighing two to seven times as much. Closed, but already ripe, cones still on the trees will also open after being exposed to the heat of a fire. Unlike the cones of the related Tecate cypress (Hesperocyparis forbesii), the cones will also open after drying for several months on the tree without needing to be exposed to fire. Each seed is about 5–6 millimeters long with a small wing structure about 1 millimeter. The cones and seeds are fully ripe 15 to 18 months after fertilization.

The pollen-producing cones (strobili) have 14 to 18 scales. This is another characteristic that botanists use to distinguish it from the Tecate cypress, which only has 10 to 14 scales on its pollen cones. The strobili are also rather large, about 6 millimeters long and 2–5 millimeters in diameter. The pollen is produced from October to November when growing in California, while in France and Italy they have been observed producing pollen from December to March.

The lifespan of cypress trees can be estimated from the number of annual growth rings found in the trunks of dead trees. Using this measurement, the average longevity is estimated at 150 to 160 years for a tree with a 50 centimeter diameter, though one trunk examined by botanical explorer Edward Palmer with a diameter of approximately 64 centimeters had 236 growth rings. The seedlings are very similar to all other western cypress species, with three to five long, thin, needle-like seed leaves that start out upright and then spread outwards from the stem. Each leaf is usually between 8 and 12 millimeters long. The juvenile leaves also resemble the needle-like seed leaves, but are not quite as long or as thick or fleshy in texture. In the second to fourth year of life the young tree will start to produce adult foliage rather than another set of juvenile leaves.

In the first year of growth, given favorable growing conditions, young trees will reach an average of 40 to 45 centimeters in height. By the end of a second year they will reach 110 centimeters. This rapid growth can continue, with a new tree reaching an estimated 9.7 meters in its first decade.

== Taxonomy ==
Specimens of Hesperocyparis guadalupensis were collected by Edward Palmer in 1875 during a botanical collecting trip to Guadalupe Island. It was given its first scientific description in 1879 by Sereno Watson, who named it Cupressus guadalupensis. In the paper he presented on 14 May 1879 he said that the seeds and other material collected by Palmer had been labeled as Cupressus macrocarpa. At the time of the presentation they were already being cultivated in San Francisco.

In 1896 Maxwell T. Masters, as part of a paper on the genus Cupressus as a whole, thought it properly classified as Cupressus macrocarpa var. guadalupensis, reducing it to a botanical variety. In the same paper he also combined a number of Mexican species to just two, Cupressus benthamii and Cupressus thurifera. Though Masters was followed in full or at least in part in these combinations, other botanists continued to regard the species as correctly identified under the name C. guadalupensis.

By 1970, botanical opinions had so far reversed that Elbert Luther Little published a paper in which he combined the species Cupressus forbesii with C. guadalupensis as variety forbesii. In the 2000s, studies of the genetics of these species have indicated that they are separate species, though confirming they are closely related. Though an isolated island population, Guadalupe cypress has greater genetic diversity than its mainland relatives. This lack of a population bottleneck suggests that prior to recent disturbances it had a large and stable population. Further research resulted in the 2009 publication by Jim A. Bartel and others moving it and the other new world cypress trees to a new genus Hesperocyparis. There was a second proposed reclassification to a new genus Neocupressus in the same year, but the classification as Hesperocyparis has been given priority.

While this reclassification is not universally accepted, it is the most commonly used name for the species. As of 2024 it is the name used in Plants of the World Online, World Flora Online, and in the Gymnosperm Database.

=== Names ===
The species name of guadalupensis is a reference to its native island, while the current genus name, Hesperocyparis, is botanical Greek meaning "western cypress". As with its scientific name. it is commonly called the "Guadalupe cypress" or "Guadalupe Island cypress" for its origin on that island. Similarly, in Spanish it is commonly called "Ciprès de Guadalupe" and is listed on a Mexican government website as "Cedro de la isla Guadalupe ". Another, less common, name used for the species in California is "blue cypress" for the color of its foliage, though the Australian tree Callitris columellaris is also called blue cypress by essential oil enthusiasts for the color of its extracted oil.

== Distribution and habitat ==
The Guadalupe cypress, Hesperocyparis guadalupensis, is endemic to Mexico, only found naturally on Guadalupe Island in the Pacific Ocean west of Baja California. It is found growing at altitudes of 800–1,300 metres (2,600–4,300 ft). In the 21st century the cypress trees cover the greatest area of any tree community on the island, but only grow on the northwest of the island on a high plateau.

Guadalupe Island is of volcanic origin. Located off the coast of North America, the island's climate is dominated by cold Pacific Ocean currents, resulting in a climate similar to that of the mainland far to the north. During the summer the weather is warm or even hot, but during the winter the island is often covered in fogs. The fine twigs of the cypress trees collect the airborne moisture, which falls to the ground or runs down their trunks, making the area immediately under the trees wetter than areas without tall vegetation. High winds also buffet the island during the winter, but when there were extensive groves of cypress trees the air within them was sheltered and calm.

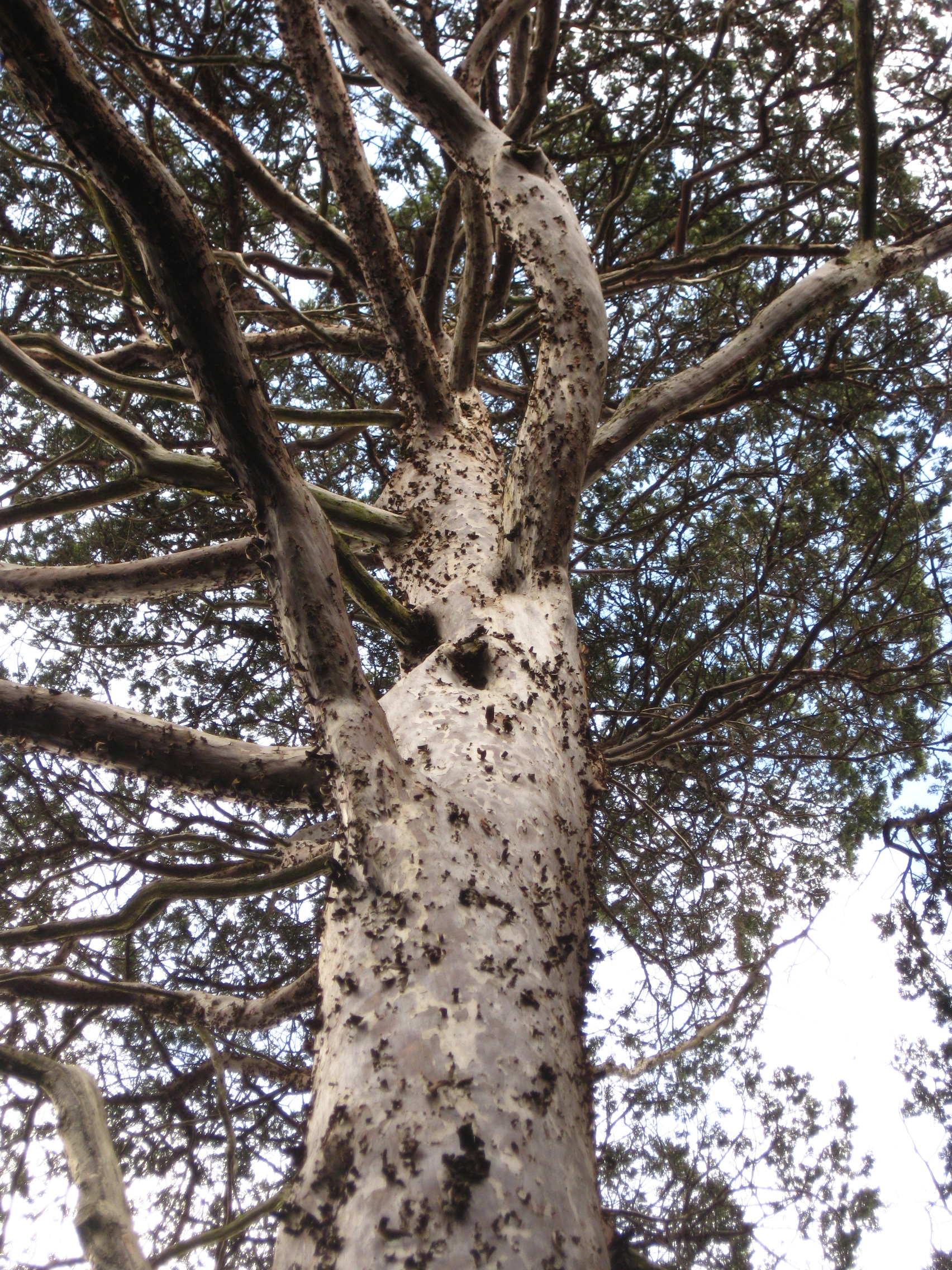
Hesperocyparis guadalupensis bark - Golden Gate Park, San Francisco, California

The introduction of goats to the island had an enormous effect on the population of all plant species, including Guadalupe cypress. The date at which goats were released onto the island is unknown, but the first mention of them is in 1859. The estimated population of the tree prior to the introduction of goats to the island was about 75,000. In 1885 the botanist Edward Lee Greene observed that while there was evidence of an extensive cypress forest on the northern side of the island, only dead and fallen trees remained there. There was also a smaller grove on the east side of the island, but it too disappeared sometime after the 1920s.

In addition the available evidence indicates that the frequency of fire has increased on the island. Though Guadalupe cypress is partially adapted to fire, the increasing number of fires is likely to be an additional cause of early mortality for the trees.

== Ecology ==
Together with the Guadalupe palm (Brahea edulis) and the Guadalupe pine (Pinus radiata var. binata), Guadalupe cypress is one of the dominant defining species of plant on the island, a keystone in its natural ecology. In the 1950s a study of a Guadalupe Island bird life found that the subspecies of the ruby-crowned kinglet (Corthylio calendula obscurus) frequents the cypress groves on the island. Another very common bird in the groves was the endemic subspecies of the house finch, Haemorhous mexicanus amplus.

== Conservation and restoration ==
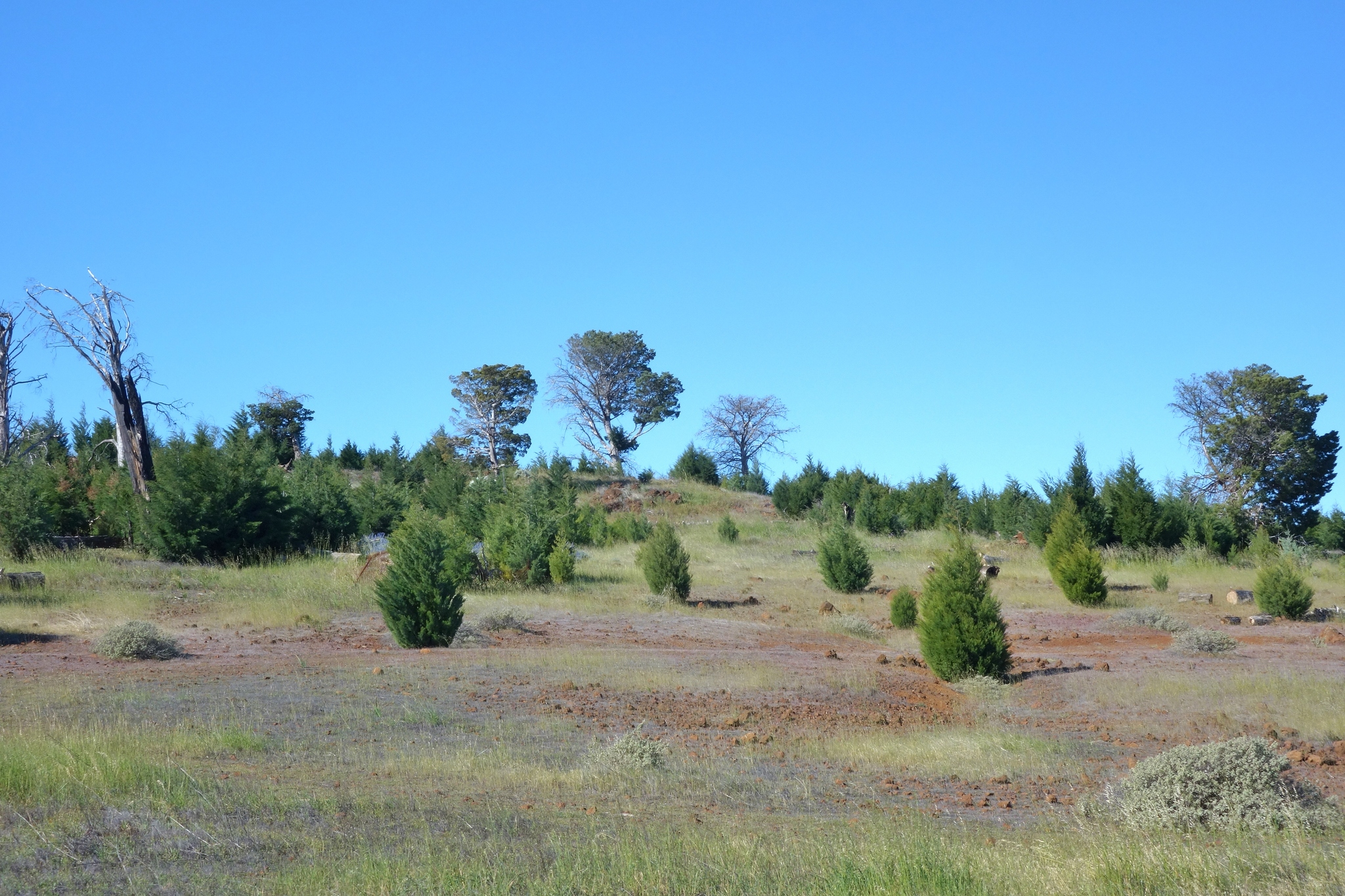
Hesperocyparis guadalupensis showing regeneration after the removal of goats from Guadalupe Island. Photographed in 2015

Guadalupe Island had a population of numerous, but old, trees in 2000. Estimates of the remaining population vary widely. In the year 2000 it was estimated to be 4,000 individuals. However, the IUCN gives an undated estimate of only 200 mature trees remaining. As a viable conifer woodland species they disappeared rapidly from the late 19th century onwards, as hordes of introduced feral goats ate the seedlings that germinated for over a century. One major subpopulation was destroyed entirely, and the isolated stands were nearly destroyed. Also, with the animals destroying most vegetation, and especially the island's cloud forest, the water table dropped, further jeopardizing the remaining two main subpopulations.

The principal habitats were fenced in by 2001; and long-awaited removal of goats was started in 2004 and completed by 2007. In order to accomplish this task Grupo de Ecología y Conservación de Islas, A.C. (GECI) used 40 sterilized Judas goats to track down the last holdouts hiding in less accessible areas of the island like canyons, cliffs, and caves. The first young plants in 150 years are now able to grow and mature without being grazed away. Soon after the eradication the population was estimated to be 14,700 in 2005, though without any information on if this included new seedlings. In April 2005 the Mexican government also created the Guadalupe Island Biosphere Reserve, giving further protection to the trees and other species of the island.

On 15 September 2008 a wildfire was ignited that burned for three days and spread into the Guadalupe cypress groves. Two groves and one small stand representing about 60% of the total area were burned. Many mature trees, damaged by years of goats chewing their bark during droughts, were completely burned by the fires. However, in the post-fire assessment, many newly released seeds were observed on the fire-blackened soil. An assessment conducted one year later found 120,000 new trees in the southern patch. A 2019 assessment found over 67,000 trees over 2 meters in height.

In addition to the natural regeneration, the Mexican foundation GECI has partnered with the Fondation Franklinia, a Swiss charity, to plant thousands of seedlings of the cypress and two other endangered tree species on the island since 2020. They have also sponsored work to reduce the fuel load of the landscape to reduce future threats from fire.

The presently recovering populations are still vulnerable and long-term viability is not assured. It appears this cypress is more vulnerable to drought than other native plants on the island, such as the Guadalupe variety of Monterey pine (Pinus radiata var. binata), and so the population could decline further with future climate change.

Hesperocyparis guadalupensis is considered an endangered species by the IUCN. It is also designated as an endangered species by the government of Mexico.

== Cultivation ==
Though endangered in the wild, Guadalupe cypresses have long been cultivated in California and in other parts of the world. Though the exact date is not known, in the San Francisco area they were being grown before 1878. Though it has a long history of use in gardens and parks, it is not a commonly grown species in the United States. The scientist William Dallimore reported that it seldom produced cones in cultivation and similar reports continue to be repeated. However, trees grown in both Italy and France produce seed crops and are most often propagated from seeds, though they are also successfully grown from cuttings and grafting, including onto Cupressus sempervirens or Hesperocyparis glabra. It is a much more popular and common ornamental species in Europe than in America.

The trees have very little frost tolerance and are particularly noted as being sensitive to frosts in the spring. They are often reported as being limited to USDA Zone 9 or warmer, requiring a minimum low temperature of between −6.5 and −1 °C (20 and 30 °F). However, the narrow column-like (fastigiate) cultivar 'Greenlee's Blue Rocket' is reported to tolerate temperatures as low as −9.5 °C (15 °F). They are also particularly suited to coastal plantings, being resistant to damage by coastal sprays and winds. They are also very adaptable to different soil conditions. Unlike the Monterey cypress they are highly resistant to cypress canker, with only one report of a tree being infected in scientific literature. In Europe they sometimes show signs of cypress bark beetles (Phloeosinus) in their crown. There are not any significant plantations of Guadalupe cypresses and they are not used to any extent in their native habitat.

The largest known tree is an individual growing in a Fresno, California park. It is 21 m (69 ft) in height and has a trunk diameter at breast height of 1.63 m (5.3 ft).
