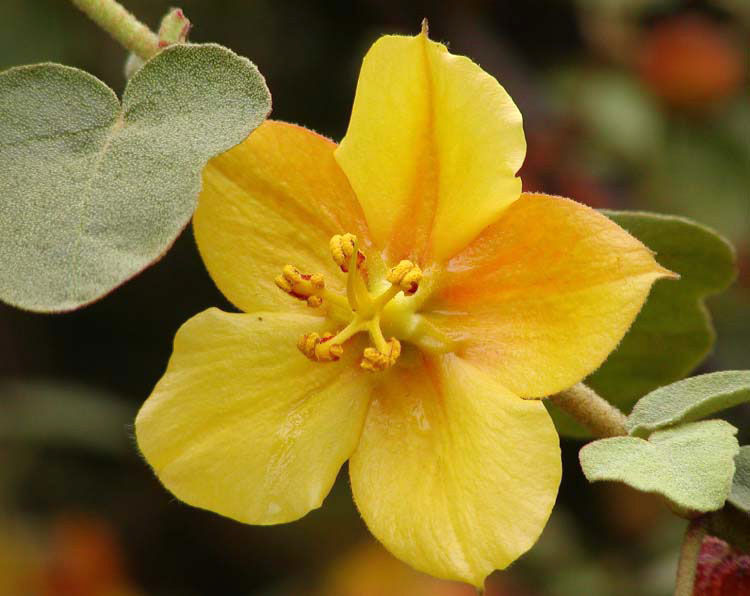
- Fremontodendron 'Ken Taylor' (F. californicum × F. mexicanum)

Scientific classification
- Kingdom: Plantae
- Clade: Tracheophytes
- Clade: Angiosperms
- Clade: Eudicots
- Clade: Rosids
- Order: Malvales
- Family: Malvaceae
- Subfamily: Bombacoideae
- Genus: Fremontodendron; Coville

Species
- Fremontodendron californicum (Torr.) Coville; Fremontodendron mexicanum Davidson

Synonyms
- Fremontia Torr., nom. illeg.

= Fremontodendron =

Flannelbush

Genus of shrubs

Fremontodendron, with the common names fremontia and flannelbush or flannel bush, is a genus of three known species of shrubs native to the Southwestern United States and northwest Mexico.

== Taxonomy ==
They are within the botanical family Malvaceae. Formerly they were treated within the Sterculiaceae, tribe Fremontodendreae, together with the genus Chiranthodendron. The genus Fremontodendron was named in dedication to John C. Frémont, who first collected it during an 1846 expedition to Alta California.

== Description ==
The leaves have a leathery and fuzzy texture reminiscent of flannel (hence the name), and the yellow to orange flowers are large and showy. The leaves and young shoots can cause skin and eye irritation.

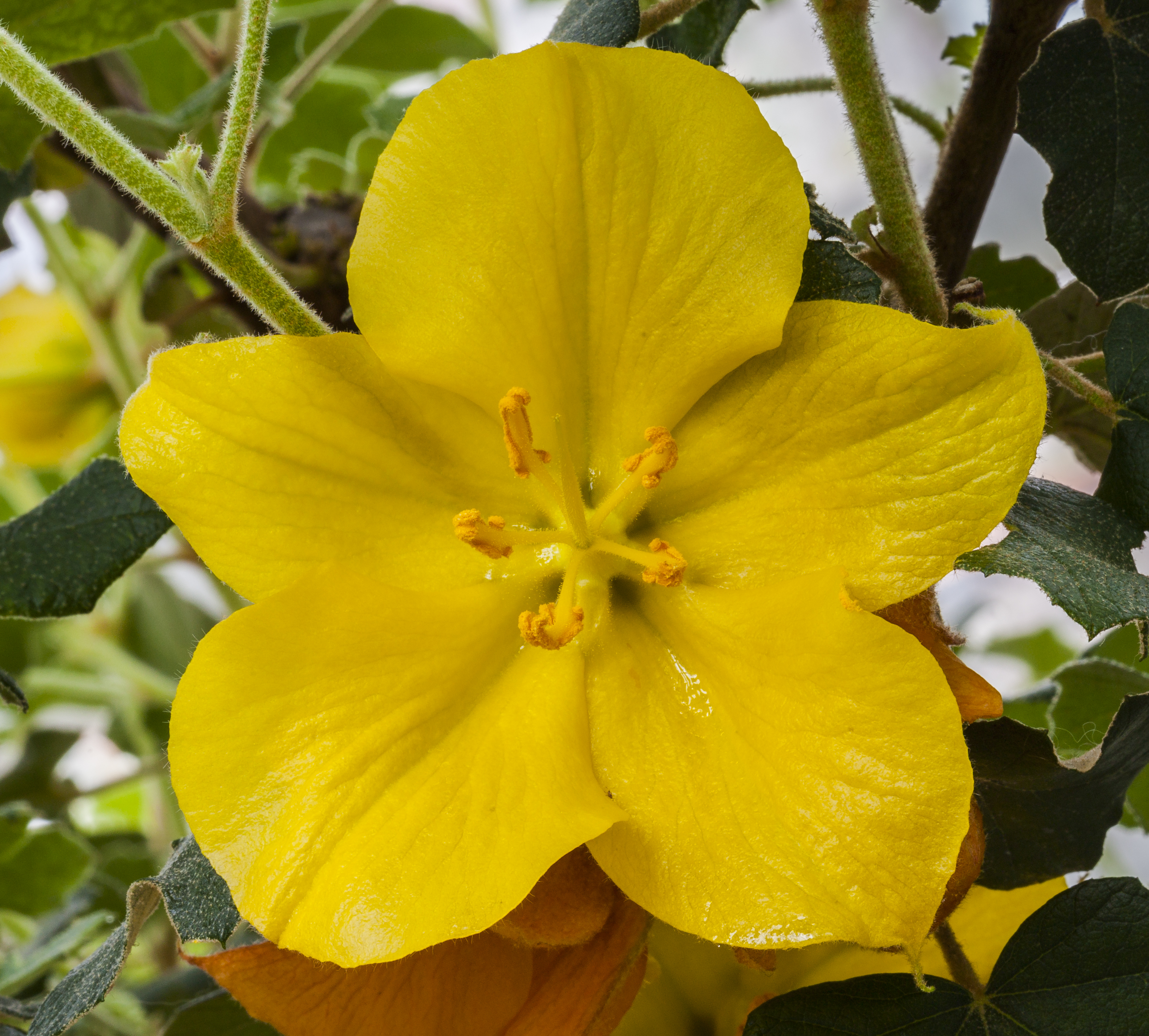
Fremontodendron californicum — Californian flannelbush.

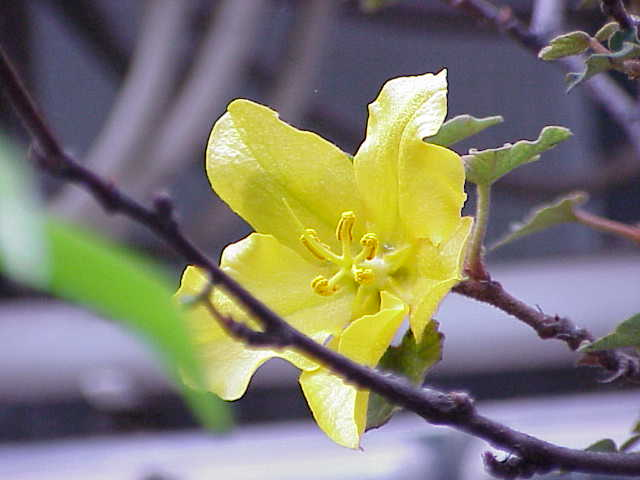
Fremontodendron californicum (ssp. napensis) — Napa Fremontia.

=== Species ===
Two species are accepted:

- Fremontodendron californicum (Torr.) Coville — Californian flannelbush
  - Fremontodendron californicum subsp. californicum
  - Fremontodendron californicum subsp. decumbens (R.M.Lloyd) Munz — Pine Hill flannelbush

A decumbent and low spreading form, 3 feet (0.91 m) in height and 6 feet (1.8 m) in width, has yellow-orange flowers, and is endemic to the Sierra Nevada foothills, nearly all of the individuals of this subspecies are found in the Pine Hill Ecological Reserve in El Dorado County. In nature it only grows in metal-rich gabbro soil, a red weathered soil of volcanic origin. It requires fire for seed germination, but with the nature reserve is near human settlements fire ecology is suppressed. It is a federally listed endangered species.

- Fremontodendron mexicanum Davidson — Mexican flannelbush

Endemic to the central Peninsular Ranges, known from about ten occurrences in northern Baja California state and adjacent southern San Diego County, California. However, it has most recently been confirmed to exist in only two of those locales currently.

== Cultivation ==
Fremontodendrons are cultivated as ornamental plants. They are valued for their bright yellow flowers, produced over a long period on a rapidly growing shrub or small tree. They are tolerant of pruning for size or shaping. They are adapted to dry, poor soils in a summer-dry, warm, sunny climate. They may succumb to root rot in heavy clay soils and/or summer irrigation.

The three species and varied hybrids/cultivars are used in native plant, water-conserving, and wildlife gardens in California. They are also planted in gardens in England.

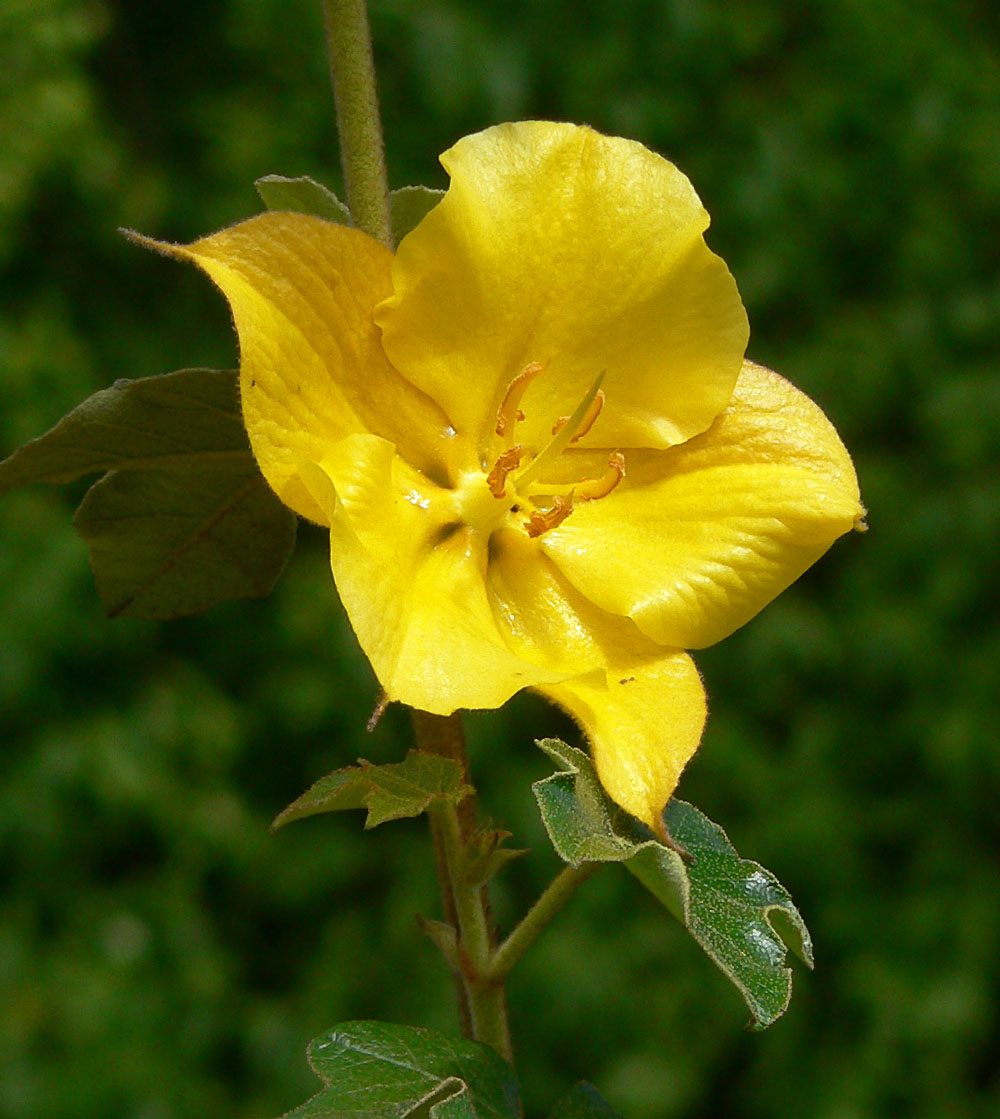
Hybrid Fremontodendron 'California Glory'

=== Hybrids ===
There are several named hybrids of Fremontodendron californicum and Fremontodendron mexicanum in the horticultural trade, they include:

- Fremontodendron 'California Glory' — lemon-yellow flowers with a reddish tinge, grows 20 feet (6.1 m) in height by 20 feet (6.1 m) in width. It is the winner of the Award of Garden Merit from the California Horticultural Society in 1965, and received a First Class Certificate from the Royal Horticultural Society in 1967.
- Fremontodendron 'Ken Taylor' — golden flowers with a darker orange outside petals in the spring and summer, and grows to only 5 feet (1.5 m) in height by 8–10 feet (2.4–3.0 m) in width.
- Fremontodendron 'Dara's Gold' — golden flowers over a long period from late winter through early summer, grows 3 feet (0.91 m) in height by 6–8 feet (1.8–2.4 m) in width. A hybrid between Fremontodendron decumbens and Fremontodendron mexicanum.
