= Native American recreational activities =

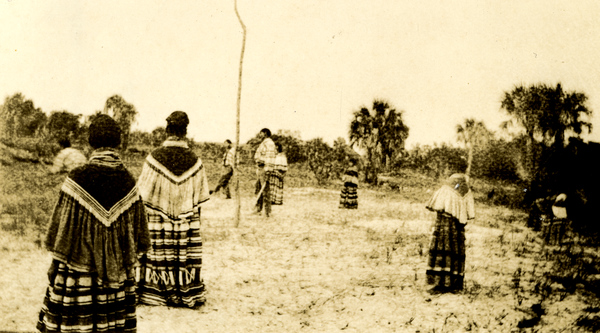
Stickball was one of the many early sports played by American indigenous people in the early 1700s.

Early Native American recreational activities consisted of diverse sporting events, card games, and other innovative forms of entertainment. Most of these games and sporting events were recorded by observations from the early 1700s. Common athletic contests held by early American tribes (such as the Algonquian, Cherokee, Iroquoian, Sioux, Lakota, Choctaw, and Great Lakes peoples) included games of stickball (an early form of lacrosse also known as "Little Brother of War"), chunkey, archery, darts, foot races, and canoeing. Card and dice games were commonly used as forms of entertainment among tribes such as the Iroquois and Lakota. Several contests and games invented by American indigenous groups contributed to modern-day sports (like the game of lacrosse) and casino play. Several indigenous games were tribe-specific; one of the most common games played specifically by the Iroquoian was the Bowl Game, played using colored balls and sticks.

== Importance of tribal games ==
Games and athletic contests were played for reasons such as religious beliefs, politics, wagering, solving disputes, healing benefits, land use, and for entertainment (Delsahut). In 1639, it was observed that some tribes would use a Huron dice game to heal the sick. Native Americans would often play games to "ceremoniously bring luck like rain, good harvests, drive away evil spirits, or just bring people together for a common purpose". Some games were meant for children, teaching skills such as hand-eye coordination, discipline, and the importance of challenging work and respect. Some activities were purely enjoyed by adults. Games such as stickball were so physical that players were often injured; yet, it was one of the most popular sports played by a wide range of tribes who contested against each other frequently in order to settle disputes that may have otherwise led to war.

== Types of entertainment ==
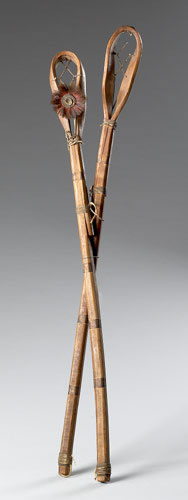
Stickball was played using wooden sticks with nets at the top in order to catch the playing ball.

=== Stickball ===
Stickball (also referred to as "Little Brother of War") is one of the most well-known sports that was played among early American indigenous tribes, as it was the game that modern-day lacrosse is derived from. Early versions of stickball had very flexible rules and boundaries and would often be played as part of a war between two villages. Players would have sticks with nets at the top and would pass balls to players of the same team. To win, teams would have to throw the ball into a designated goal as many times as they could. "These games, which could last for several days, were played in large open fields located between the two feuding villages. Goals could range from 500 yards to several miles apart, with as many as 100 to 10,000 men participating." The Cherokee and Choctaw people were tribes that were known to play the game in the 1700s. "Today, the game is played not only by the Cherokee but also by many other Southeastern Woodland tribes including the Muscogee, Seminole, Yuchi and Natchez, using very similar rules."

=== Chunkey ===
American Indians in Mississippi valley (specifically Bayogoulas and the Choctaw people) were known to play a game called "chunkey" in the early 1700s. James F. Barnett Jr. describes in his scholarly essay "Ferocity and Finesse: American Indian Sports in Mississippi" that the game of chunkey was valued by indigenous people in a spiritual and political matter. In Mississippi, stickball was primarily played by indigenous men, while women were known to play chunkey as an alternative. The game was a two-person contest, and the objective was to throw spear-like poles (usually 8–15 feet in length) at hoops that were rolling. Other versions of the game throughout the country were observed over time. The Choctaw people were observed in the 1770s playing chunkey with circular stones, or disks, instead of poles on a designated playing field (made from clay) at least two hundred feet in length. According to James Adair, an Englishman who lived with the Chickasaws in the mid-1700s, chunkey stones were prized highly; they would be passed down from one generation to the next, and the stones were carefully stored in safe places between games.

=== Archery ===
One of the earliest known games played among Native Americans was archery. Indians would play this with the goal of hitting a target or an animal. Accounts of Indians playing this game date back to AD 250. The Algonquian and Iroquoian tribes, located around present-day Michigan, would use locally found supplies to create their bows. Long pieces of "hardwoods such as hickory, black locust, ash, elm, and ironwood" were often used. Bows were usually crafted to be long so they were easier to use. Many different materials were used to create arrowheads, such as antler, copper, and wood; yet, stone arrowheads were the most sought after. They proved to be much stronger and more effective than any other material. A game other than archery, known as bows and arrows, was popular in the Great Plains. In this game, an arrow would be placed in the ground somewhere and participants would try to shoot their arrow across it. The winner of this game would take home all the other arrows.

=== Gambling ===
Gambling can be traced back to early Native American history, when tribes would wager their horses, food, and other personal possessions over games such as chunkey and stickball. Many Native American games, including dice games and archery, would always have bets placed on their outcomes. Wagering became a culture for several tribes. Martin Rizzo explains in the book Prehistoric Games of North American Indians: Subarctic to Mesoamerica that gamblers would often wager their own bodies for enslavement, and later, slave owners among tribes would gamble their slaves. Among the people of the Upper Columbia River, gamblers would sometimes lose family members to slavery, including wives and children, through bets that they placed over games. Early betting among Native American tribes is often seen as evidence as to why several American Indians today gamble like their early ancestors.

=== Canoeing ===
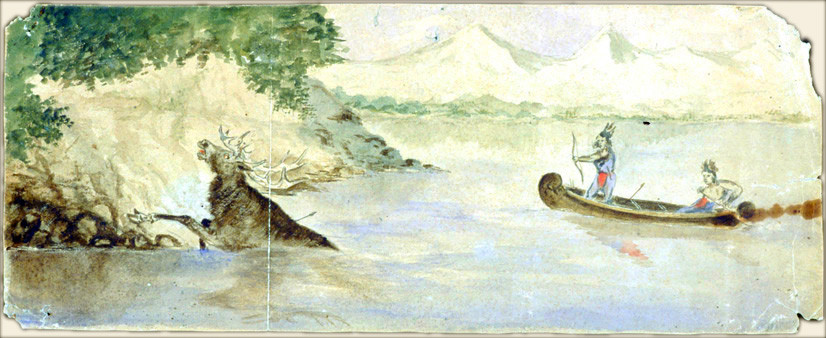
Indigenous peoples would often hunt while floating in canoes.

Canoes were not just a primary mode of transportation for some Native American tribes, but the function and purpose of having canoes were inspired by indigenous religious beliefs. These vessels were observed by North American explorers like Samuel de Champlain as early as the year 1603. Carved tree bark, indigenous canoes were sturdy and handmade. Natives living in the Northeast of the United States in the 1700s used canoes to fish, and in some cases, shoot bows and arrows from. Rowing contests were a frequent athletic contest found among American tribes. Kayaks, shorter versions of the canoe (usually 10–28 feet long), were used to tow animals that were retrieved while hunting.

== Regional Indigenous recreation ==
=== "Pass the stone" ===
"Pass the stone" was a very simple guessing game that is still used today to educate children on Native American culture. Two different colored balls are passed around a circle. Keeping their eyes closed, children are asked what color ball they were given. If they guess correctly, they remain in the circle. If they guessed incorrectly, they would exit the circle.

=== Additional lesser-known games ===
Not all games were as widespread as others. Ring the stick game focused on hand-eye coordination. Participants would use a stick with a ring strung onto the bottom of it. The ring would be thrown into the air and the participant would try to catch the ring on the stick. The butterfly hide-and-seek game was a silent game of hide-and-seek. The seeker would sing "Butterfly, butterfly, show me where to go" then silently go look for the hiding players. The moccasin game was played with two teams, four moccasins, and a stone. One team would hide the stone in one of their moccasins while the other team was not looking. Then, the other team would try to find the moccasin with the stone. The sep game was a way to get children to fall asleep. After singing a combination of songs, the leader would say "sep", cueing the children to be quiet and go to sleep until the next day.

== Chance vs. dexterity ==
=== Chance ===
Native American games were divided by whether they were won by chance or dexterity. The three most common games of chance were dice games, hand games, and the bowl game. Dice games were very similar to those today. People would roll a pair of dice until they added up to a specific number. The hand game was popular because various tribes were able to play it, despite a language barrier. One person would have an object and pass it between their hands while the other person attempted to guess which hand the object was in. The bowl game involved six nuts that had two distinct colors. If the bowl was hit on the ground and five of the nuts landed on the same color, one team or participant received a point. The side with the most points won. With a little bit of gambling, these games could last a long time, depending on how competitive the indigenous people were.

=== Dexterity ===
Many more games that were played required the use of dexterity. Such games included bows and arrows, snow snake, hoop and pole, and a variety of games involving a ball and running. Snow snake had to be played in the winter. Participants would gather rocks, sticks, and other items. Each participant would slide their object towards a target, and the object that got closest to the target won. The hoop and pole game required two opponents. Each one would attempt to hit the target hoop with their pole. The person who hit the hoop won. If they both hit it or both missed it, they would try again. Other games included early lacrosse and a variety of foot races.

== The role of women in Native American recreation ==
Some indigenous games were intended for all men players; however, women still contributed to the recreation and entertainment culture of Native tribes. It was part of Native American culture for women to avidly compete in races, juggling, Choctaw stickball, double ball games, and basketball. Women were often the ones who would carve out spears and arrowheads that would be used for archery contests and other sports. Professor Fabrice Delsahut and Thierry Terret describe how North American Indian women participated in and helped bring about Native games in volume 23 of the Women's History Review. Because foot races were held primarily for men, Indian women would hold their own races and organize them in valleys, away from the general population of tribes. Ball games like the "double ball game" (played throughout the Southwest in the early 1700s) were invented purely for women. For the double ball game, "players had to catch two bags made of deerskin that were tied together with a leather strap, with a forked branch or two pieces of wood, passing them from one player to another and moving them towards the opponents’ goal." Other sports such as swimming and wrestling were reported among Kutchin, Mandan, and Manataree women.
