= CAH =

CAH can stand for:

== Science and technology ==
- Congenital adrenal hyperplasia
- Calcium Aluminate Hydrate, an important phase in cement chemistry
- Chlorinated Aromatic Hydrocarbon
- CAH, a mnemonic used to teach trigonometry, showing that cosine is the ratio of adjacent over hypotenuse

== Companies and organizations ==
- Cardinal Health (NYSE:CAH)
- Community of All Hallows, an Anglican religious community for women
- Capital Airport Holding, airport holdings company in the People's Republic of China
- Charlan Air Charter (ICAO code), a defunct airline of South Africa

== Media ==
- Cambridge Ancient History, a bibliographic abbreviation for the work edited by Cambridge University Press
- Calvin and Hobbes, a newspaper comic strip from 1985 to 1995
- Cyanide & Happiness, a daily webcomic

== Other uses ==
- Crime against humanity
- Cards Against Humanity, a party game
- Critical Access Hospital (CAH); these must have no more than 25 beds, not counting 10 extra psychiatric beds and 10 extra inpatient rehab beds, and must be located in a rural area or an area treated as rural, be certified by the state as being a necessary provider of healthcare services to area residents, and be more than a 35-mile drive away from a hospital or other healthcare facility
- Controlled-access highway
- CAH, the IATA airport code for Cà Mau Airport
