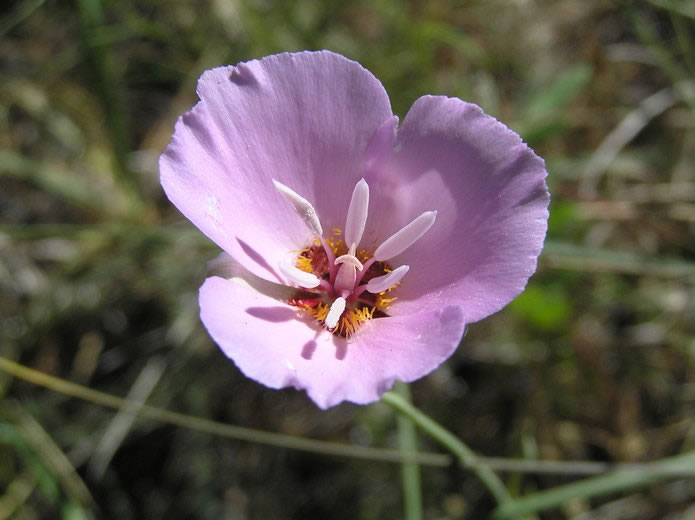
- Calochortus palmeri var. munzii

Conservation status
- Vulnerable (NatureServe)

Scientific classification
- Kingdom: Plantae
- Clade: Tracheophytes
- Clade: Angiosperms
- Clade: Monocots
- Order: Liliales
- Family: Liliaceae
- Genus: Calochortus
- Species: C. palmeri

Binomial name
- Calochortus palmeri S.Wats.

Synonyms
- Mariposa palmeri (S.Watson) Hoover; Calochortus splendens var. montanus Purdy; Calochortus invenustus var. montanus (Purdy) Parish; Calochortus montanus (Purdy) Davidson; Calochortus paludicola Davidson; Calochortus palmeri var. paludicola (Davidson) Jeps. & Ames

= Calochortus palmeri =

Species of flowering plant

Calochortus palmeri is a species of flowering plant in the lily family known by the common names Palmer's mariposa lily and strangling mariposa.

It is endemic to California, where it is distributed in the Transverse Ranges and Peninsular Ranges of Southern California (Santa Barbara, Ventura, Los Angeles, San Bernardino, Kern, Riverside, and San Diego Counties). There is also a report of an isolated population in the Diablo Range in San Benito County

== Description ==
Calochortus palmeri is a perennial herb producing a straight, branching stem up to 60 centimeters tall. The basal leaf is 10 to 20 centimeters long and withers by flowering.

The inflorescence bears 1 to 6 erect, open bell-shaped flowers. Each flower has three brown-speckled sepals 3 centimeters long and three wider petals each 2 or 3 centimeters long. The petals are white to light lavender and have bases with yellow or purple hairs, or lacking hairs, depending on variety.

Varieties

- Calochortus palmeri var. munzii — Munz's mariposa lily — rarer of the two, and known only from the Peninsular Ranges in Riverside and San Diego Counties.
- Calochortus palmeri var. palmeri — Palmer's mariposa lily — native to the Transverse Ranges.

formerly included

- Calochortus palmeri var. dunnii, now called Calochortus dunnii
