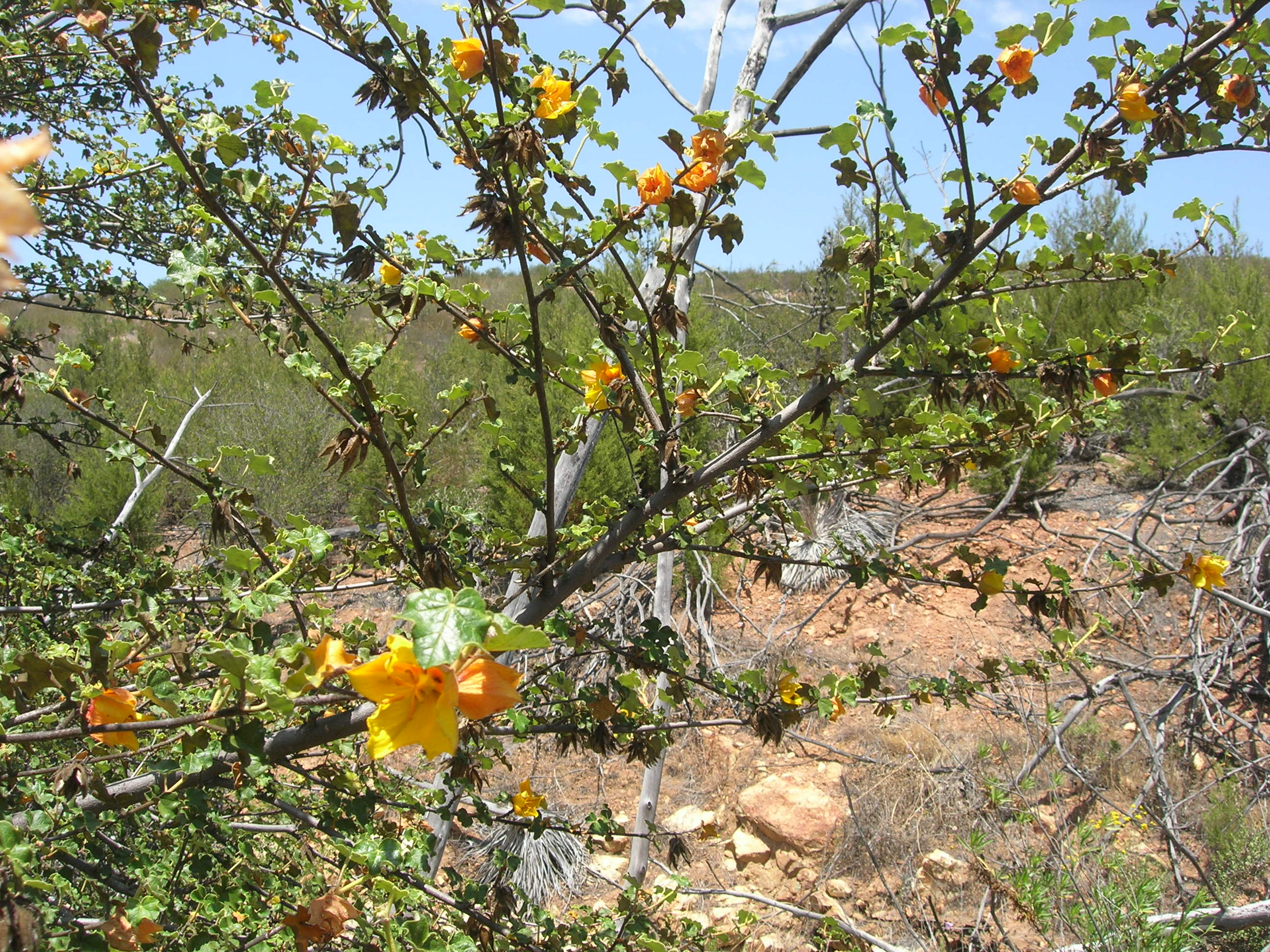

Conservation status
- Endangered (ESA)

Scientific classification
- Kingdom: Plantae
- Clade: Tracheophytes
- Clade: Angiosperms
- Clade: Eudicots
- Clade: Rosids
- Order: Malvales
- Family: Malvaceae
- Genus: Fremontodendron
- Species: F. mexicanum

Binomial name
- Fremontodendron mexicanum Davidson

= Fremontodendron mexicanum =

Species of shrub

Fremontodendron mexicanum is a rare species of shrub in the mallow family known by the common names Mexican flannelbush, Mexican fremontia, and Southern flannelbush, that is endemic to the central Peninsular Ranges in Mexico and the United States.

== Description ==
Painting of Fremontodendron mexicanum

Fremontodendron mexicanum is an erect, flowering shrub or multi-trunked small tree reaching 6–15 feet (1.8–4.6 m) high, with branches spreading to 10 feet (3.0 m) wide.

The leathery and furry olive green leaves are up to 5 centimeters long and divided into several wide lobes.

The solitary flowers, each about 6 centimeters wide, appear spread along the branches. The showy flowers are made up of five bright orange sepals and have no true petals.

== Distribution and habitat ==
The species is known from about ten occurrences in northern Baja California state and adjacent southern San Diego County, California. However, it has most recently been confirmed to exist in only two of those locales currently. The shrub grows generally on alluvial plains, in California montane chaparral and woodlands and temperate coniferous forest habitats, among Tecate cypress (Cupressus forbesii) trees.

== Conservation ==
In 1993, fewer than 100 individuals were thought to exist. In the United States it is a federally listed endangered species.

== Cultivation ==
Fremontodendron mexicanum is cultivated as an ornamental plant by specialty plant nurseries, for planting in native plant, drought tolerant, and wildlife gardens, and in natural landscaping and habitat restoration projects.

Cultivated plants need good drainage, and no supplemental summer water when established.

=== Hybrids ===
There are several named hybrids of Fremontodendron mexicanum and Fremontodendron californicum in the horticultural trade, they include:

- Fremontodendron 'California Glory' — lemon-yellow flowers with a reddish tinge, grows 20 feet (6.1 m) in height by 20 feet (6.1 m) in width. It is the winner of the Award of Garden Merit from the California Horticultural Society in 1965, and received a First Class Certificate from the Royal Horticultural Society in 1967.
- Fremontodendron 'Ken Taylor' — golden flowers with a darker orange outside petals in the spring and summer, and grows to only 5 feet (1.5 m) in height by 8–10 feet (2.4–3.0 m) in width.
- Fremontodendron 'Dara's Gold' — golden flowers over a long period from late winter through early summer, grows 3 feet (0.91 m) in height by 6–8 feet (1.8–2.4 m) in width. A hybrid between Fremontodendron decumbens and Fremontodendron mexicanum.
