= Chlorinated polycyclic aromatic hydrocarbon =

Chlorinated polycyclic aromatic hydrocarbons (Cl-PAHs) are a group of compounds comprising polycyclic aromatic hydrocarbons with two or more aromatic rings and one or more chlorine atoms attached to the ring system. Cl-PAHs can be divided into two groups: chloro-substituted PAHs, which have one or more hydrogen atoms substituted by a chlorine atom, and chloro-added Cl-PAHs, which have two or more chlorine atoms added to the molecule. They are products of incomplete combustion of organic materials. They have many congeners, and the occurrences and toxicities of the congeners differ. Cl-PAHs are hydrophobic compounds and their persistence within ecosystems is due to their low water solubility. They are structurally similar to other halogenated hydrocarbons such as polychlorinated dibenzo-p-dioxins (PCDDs), dibenzofurans (PCDFs), and polychlorinated biphenyls (PCBs). Cl-PAHs in the environment are strongly susceptible to the effects of gas/particle partitioning, seasonal sources, and climatic conditions.

== Sources ==
Chlorinated polycyclic aromatic hydrocarbons are generated by combustion of organic compounds. Cl-PAHs enter the environment from a multiplicity of sources and tend to persist in soil and in particulate matter in air. Environmental data and emission sources analysis for Cl-PAHs reveal that the dominant process of generation is by reaction of PAHs with chlorine in pyrosynthesis. Cl-PAHs have commonly been detected in tap water, fly ash from an incineration plant for radioactive waste, emissions from coal combustion and municipal waste incineration, automobile exhaust, snow, and urban air. They have also been detected in electronic wastes, workshop-floor dust, vegetation, and surface soil collected from the vicinity of an electronic waste (e-waste) recycling facility and in surface soil from a chemical industrial complex (comprising a coke-oven plant, a coal-fired power plant, and a chlor-alkali plant), and agricultural areas in central and eastern China. In addition, the combustion of polyvinylchloride and plastic wrap made from polyvinylidene chloride result in the production of Cl-PAHs, suggesting that combustion of organic materials including chlorine is a possible source of environmental pollution.

A specific class of Cl-PAHs, polychlorinated naphthalenes (PCNs), are persistent, bioaccumulative, and toxic contaminants that have been reported to occur in a wide variety of environmental and biological matrixes. Cl-PAHs with three to five rings have been reported to occur in air from road tunnels, sediment, snow, and kraft pulp mills.

Recently, the occurrence of particulate Cl-PAHs has been investigated. Results have shown that most particulate Cl-PAH concentration detected in urban air tended to be high in colder seasons and low in warmer seasons. This study also determined through compositional analysis that relatively low molecular weight Cl-PAHs dominated in warmer seasons and high molecular weight Cl-PAHs dominated in colder seasons.

== Toxicity ==
Some Cl-PAHs have structural similarities to dioxins, they are suspected of having similar toxicities. These types of compounds are known to be carcinogenic, mutagenic, and teratogenic. Toxicological studies have shown that some Cl-PAHs possess greater mutagenicity, aryl-hydorcarbon receptor activity, and dioxin-like toxicity than the corresponding parent PAHs.

The relative potency of three ring Cl-PAHs was found to increase with increasing degree of chlorination as well as with increasing degree of chlorination. However, the relative potencies of the most toxic Cl-PAHs assessed up to now have been found to be 100,000-fold lower than the relative potency of 2,3,7,8-tetrachlorodibenzo-p-dioxin (TCDD). Even though Cl-PAHs aren’t as toxic as TCDD, it has been determined using recombinant bacterial cells that the toxicities of exposure to Cl-PAHs based on AhR activity were approximately 30-50 times higher than that of dioxins. Cl-PAHs demonstrate a high enough toxicity to be a potential health risk to human populations that come into contact with them.

== DNA interaction ==
One of the well-established mechanisms by which chlorinated polycyclic aromatic hydrocarbons can exert their toxic effects is via the function of the aryl hydrocarbon receptor (AhR). The AhR-mediated activities of Cl-PAHs have been determined by using yeast assay systems. Aryl Hydrocarbon Receptor (AhR) is a cytosolic, ligand-activated transcription receptor. Cl-PAHs have the ability to bind to and activate the AhR. The biological pathway involves translocation of the activated AhR to the nucleus. In the nucleus, the AhR binds with the AhR nuclear translator protein to form a heterodimer. This process leads to transcriptional modulation of genes, causing adverse changes in cellular processes and function.

Several Cl-PAHs have been determined to be AhR-active. One such Cl-PAH, 6-chlorochrysene, has been shown to have a high affinity for the Ah receptor and to be a potent AHH inducer. Therefore, Cl-PAHs may be toxic to humans, and it is important to better understand their behavior in the environment.

Several Cl-PAHs have also been found to exhibit mutagenic activity toward Salmonella typhimurium in the Ames assay.
