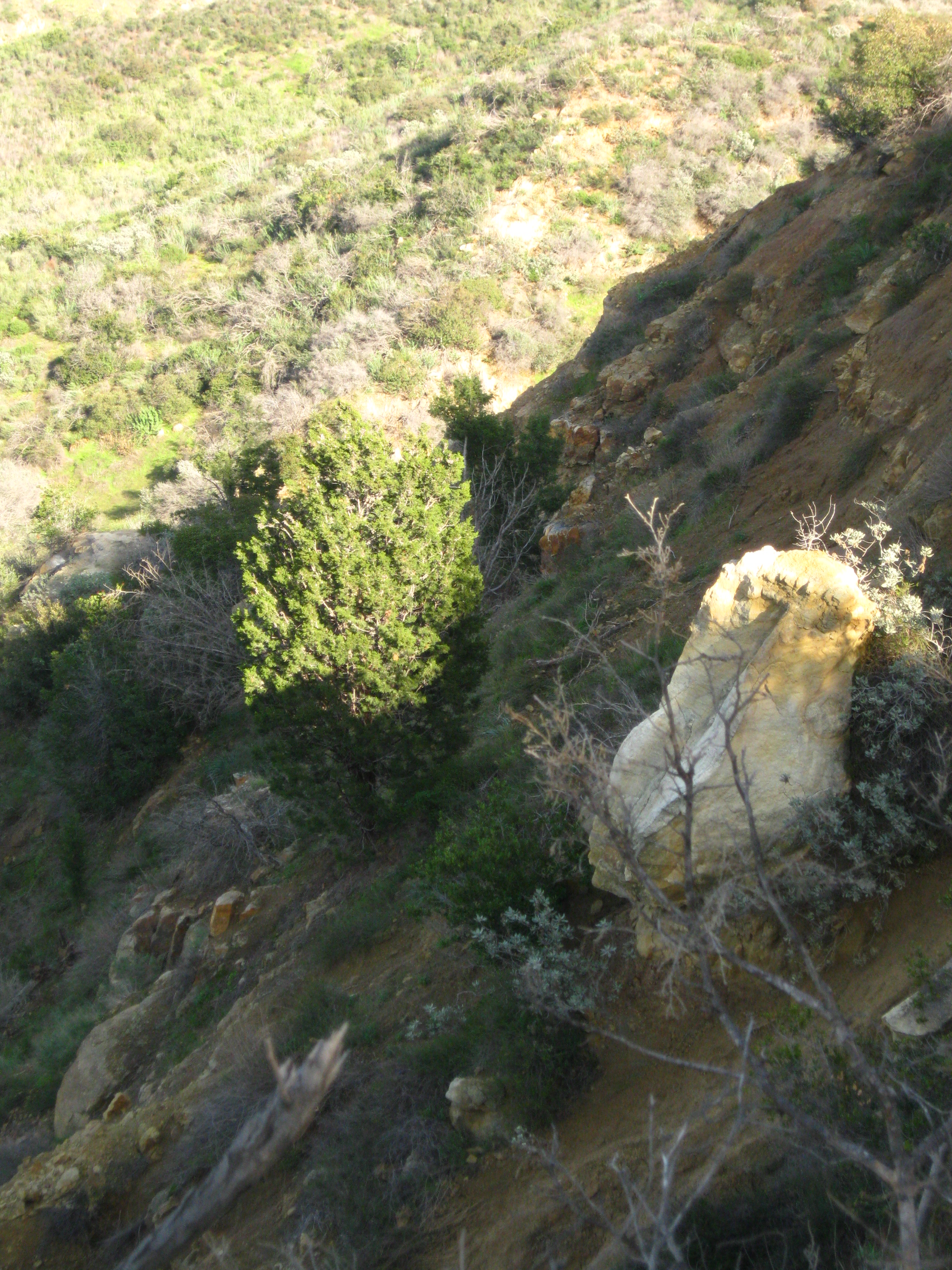
- One of the few survivors of 2006 Coal Canyon Fire, Cleveland National Forest

Conservation status
- Endangered (IUCN 3.1)

- Imperiled (NatureServe)

Scientific classification
- Kingdom: Plantae
- Clade: Tracheophytes
- Clade: Gymnosperms
- Division: Pinophyta
- Class: Pinopsida
- Order: Cupressales
- Family: Cupressaceae
- Genus: Hesperocyparis
- Species: H. forbesii

Binomial name
- Hesperocyparis forbesii (Jeps.) Bartel
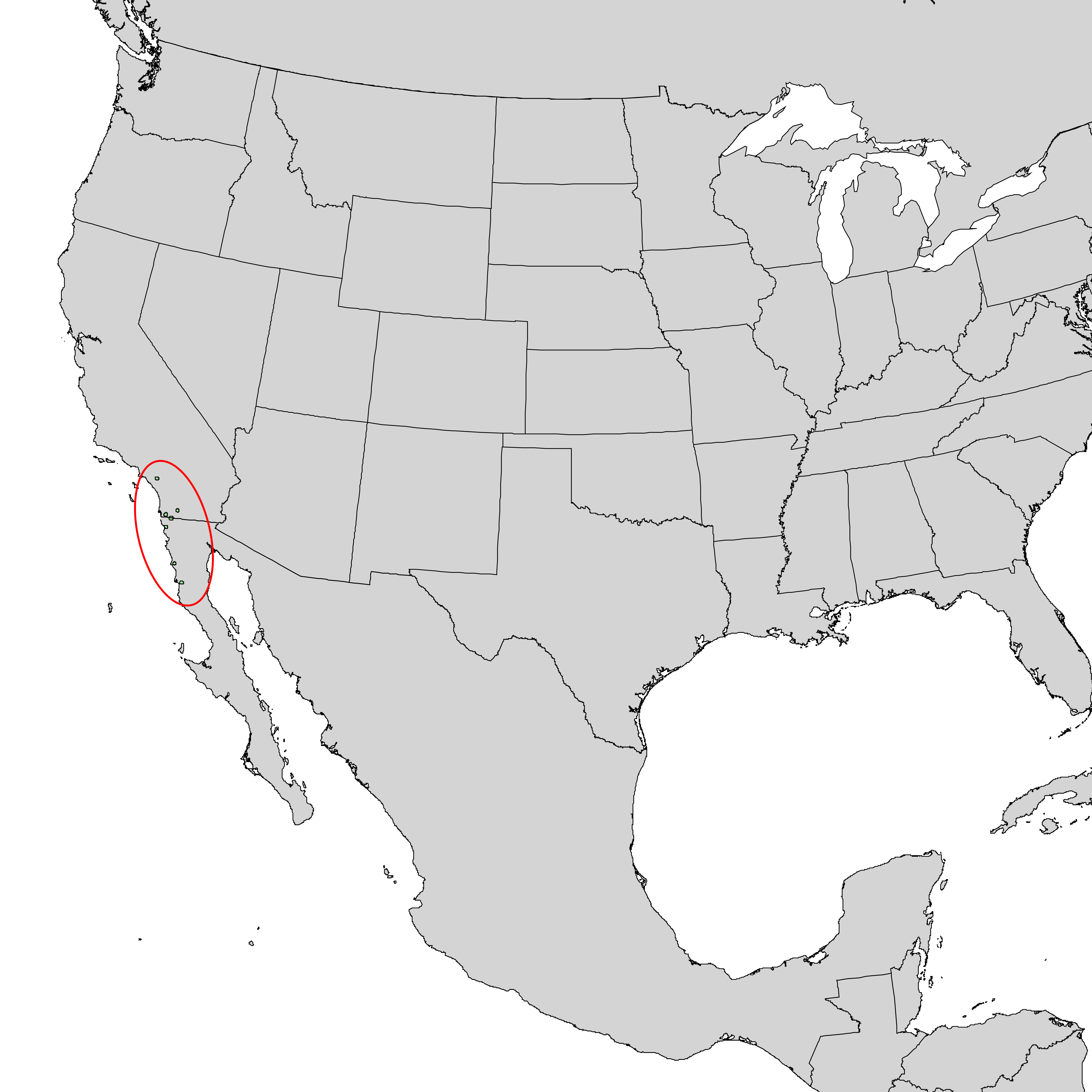
- Natural range of Hesperocyparis forbesii
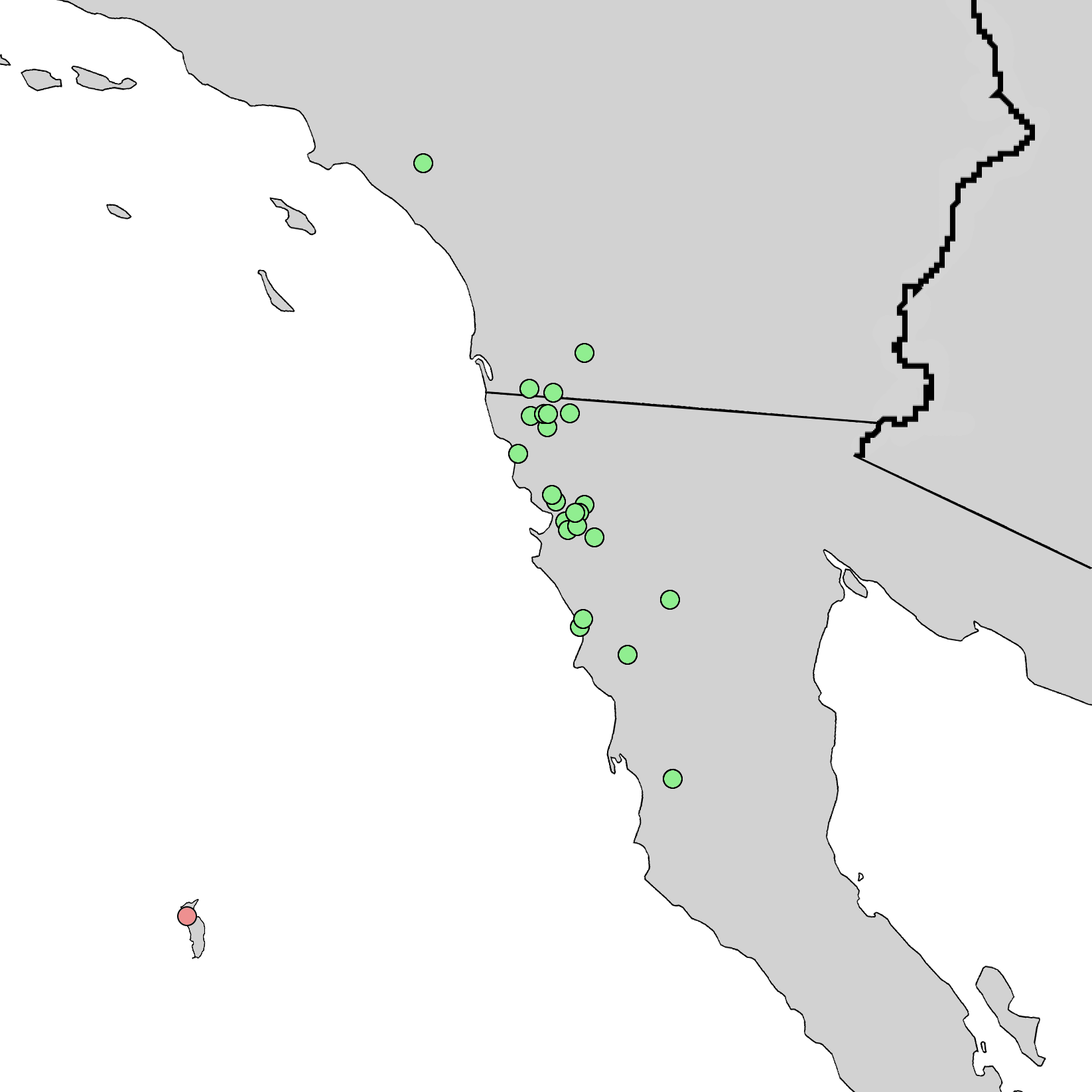
- Hesperocyparis forbesii (green); Hesperocyparis guadalupensis (red)

Synonyms
- List: Callitropsis forbesii (Jeps.) D.P.Little; Cupressus forbesii Jeps.; Cupressus guadalupensis var. forbesii (Jeps.) Little; Cupressus guadalupensis subsp. forbesii (Jeps.) R.M.Beauch.; Neocupressus guadalupensis var. forbesii (Jeps.) de Laub.

= Hesperocyparis forbesii =

Western North American species of western cypress

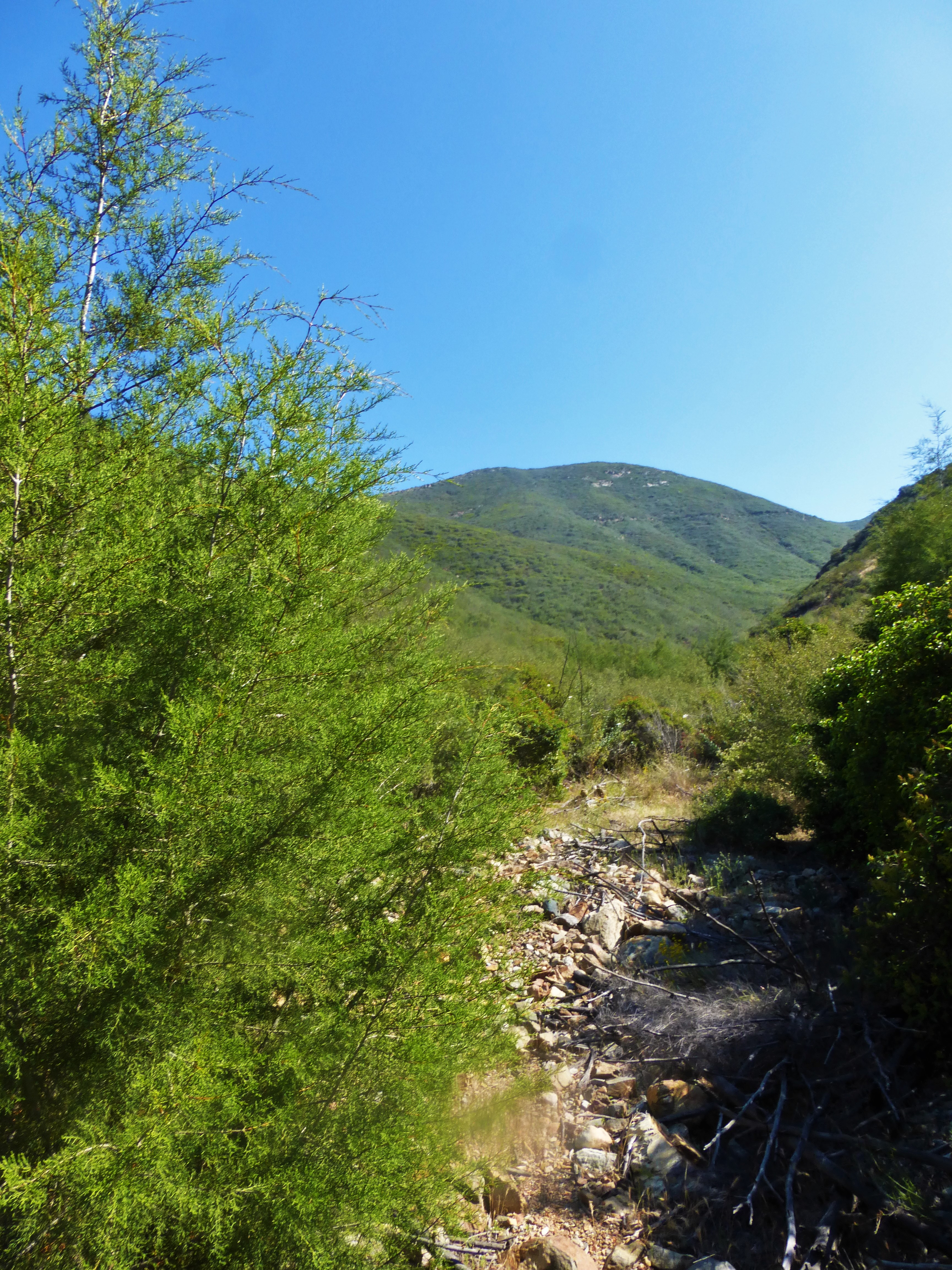
Tecate cypress in the Otay Mountain Wilderness

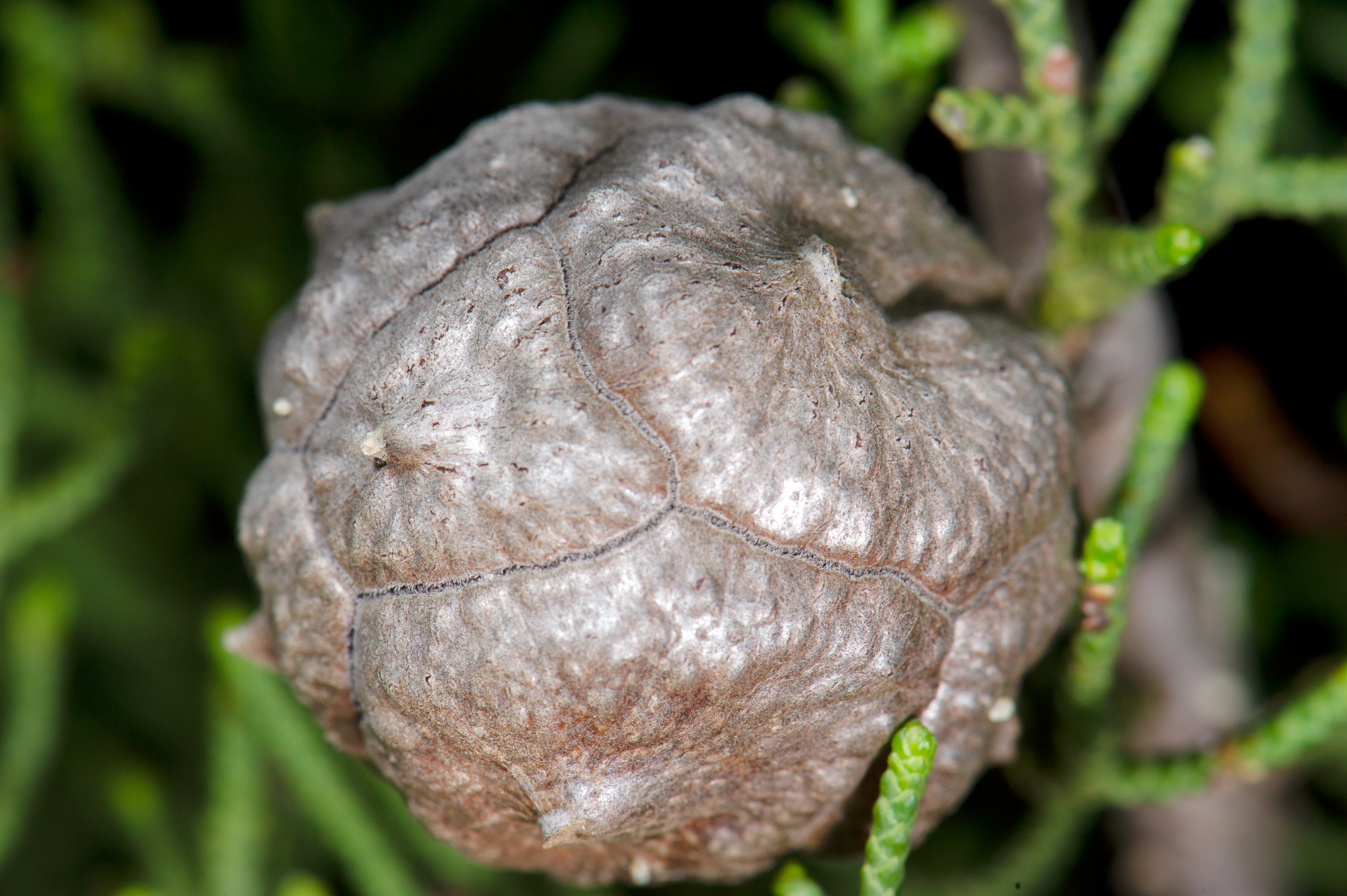
Tecate Cypress seed pod

Hesperocyparis forbesii, the Tecate cypress or Forbes' cypress, is a species of conifer in the cypress family, Cupressaceae, native to southwestern North America in California and Baja California.

== Description ==
Hesperocyparis forbesii is a tree that reaches 10 metres (33 ft), and is usually without dominant terminal shoot resulting in a multi-trunked tree. The foliage ranges from rich light green to green, and seed cones are dark brown, measuring 20–32 mm.

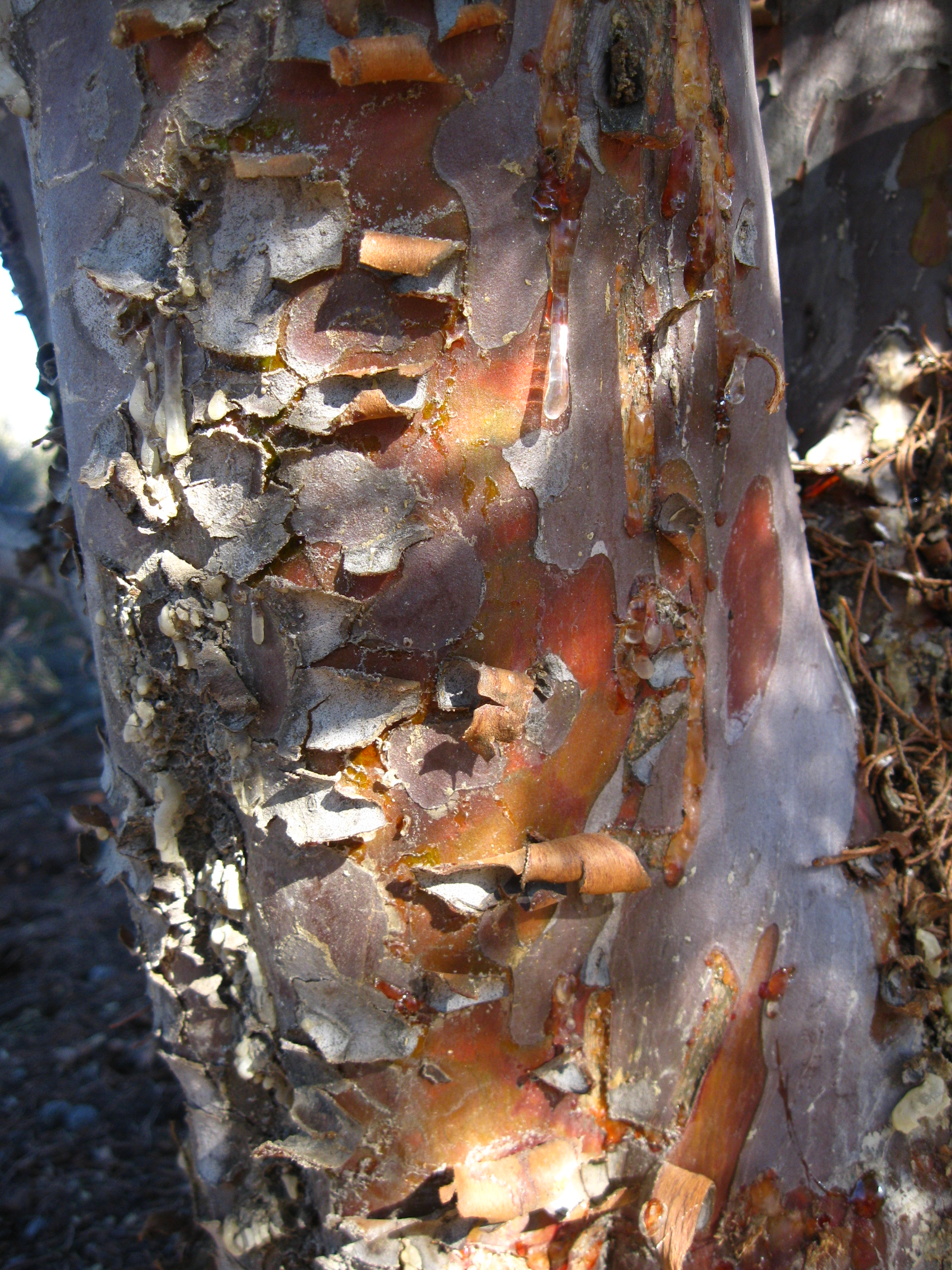
Hesperocyparis forbesii - Tecate cypress bark, at Guatay Mountain, Cuyamaca Mountains Tecate Cypress - Hesperocyparis forbesii male pollen strobili and female seed pod cones with foliage and rest of tree in the background in Coal Canyon Ecological Reserve

== Taxonomy ==
Hesperocyparis forbesii was given its first scientific description by the Californian botanist Willis Linn Jepson in 1922. It was named Cupressus forbesii by him. In 1970 Elbert Luther Little published a paper where he argued that it was insufficiently distinct from Cupressus guadalupensis and therefore should be a variety with the name var. forbesii. Ruble Mitchel Beauchamp agreed that it was not sufficiently distinct to be a species, but that it was a subspecies.

In the 2000s, studying the DNA showed the two populations to be distinct enough to be once again classified as separate species, though also showed them to be closely related. Research into the genetics of Cupressus and Juniperus as a whole resulted in a number of proposed reorganizations of the genus. The 2009 publication by Jim A. Bartel and others moving most of the North American species to a new genus Hesperocyparis is the proposal that found most acceptance. As of 2024 the name Hesperocyparis forbesii is listed as the accepted species name by Plants of the World Online, World Flora Online, and the USDA Natural Resources Conservation Service PLANTS database.

Hesperocyparis guadalupensis is endemic to Guadalupe Island off Baja California, two hundred fifty miles away from any H. forbesii stands. Molecular testing has shown Hesperocyparis guadalupensis to be slightly more closely related to Hesperocyparis stephensonii.

Major differences between Tecate cypress (Hesperocyparis forbesii) and Guadalupe cypress (Hesperocyparis guadalupensis) are:

- Guadalupe cypress, when mature, makes a much more massive and taller tree than Tecate cypress.
- Guadalupe cypress has glaucous, somewhat blue-tinted foliage, while Tecate cypress has very green foliage.
- Guadalupe cypress cones will open without fire, while Tecate cypress cones differ from any other species of California Cypress, in that even once disconnected from the parent tree, they will not open without heat.

== Distribution ==
Hesperocyparis forbesii is native to montane chaparral and woodlands habitats in the western Peninsular Ranges. It grows at elevations of 450–1,500 metres (1,480–4,920 ft). The tree is found only in the Santa Ana Mountains of Orange County and in San Diego County within Southern California, and in northern Baja California state of Mexico.

The northernmost stand, in Orange County, which comprises a large area on the upper limits of Coal Canyon and on Sierra Peak in the Santa Ana Mountains, burned in a 2006 wildfire. Very few mature trees survived but regeneration is occurring by the hundreds to thousands. However, another wildfire before trees are able to reach cone-producing age, which can be quite old for this species, could extirpate the stand.

== Ecology ==
The Tecate cypress is the only plant on which the rare Thorne's Hairstreak (Callophrys gryneus thornei) lays its eggs.

== Cultivation ==
Tecate cypress has proven to be a successful specimen tree, tolerant of the climate of Coastal California, and its cool temperatures and humidity, where other inland-growing western cypress species: such as Hesperocyparis macnabiana have done poorly in these conditions. A Tecate cypress planted at the San Francisco Botanical Garden is showing vigor and produces viable cones at forty years of age.
