= Moccasin game =

Native American gambling game

The moccasin game is a gambling game mainly played by Ojibwe, Dakota, Lakota and other affiliated Native American tribes in North America. In the game, one player hides an object (traditionally a pebble, but more recently sometimes an old bullet or a ball) in one of several moccasins, but in such a way that the other player cannot easily see which moccasin it is in; that player then has to guess which moccasin contains the object. Customarily, the game would be accompanied by music played on drums to distract the guessing player.

The game's popularity faded over time, and the old songs were forgotten. By the 1960s, only the Ojibwe of Minnesota and a few other groups still played it. However, in recent years, like many other traditional games (such as lacrosse), moccasin game has seen a resurgence of interest among younger generations. Tournaments are often held during the summer at powwows or other gatherings and are sponsored by a tribe, organization, or family.

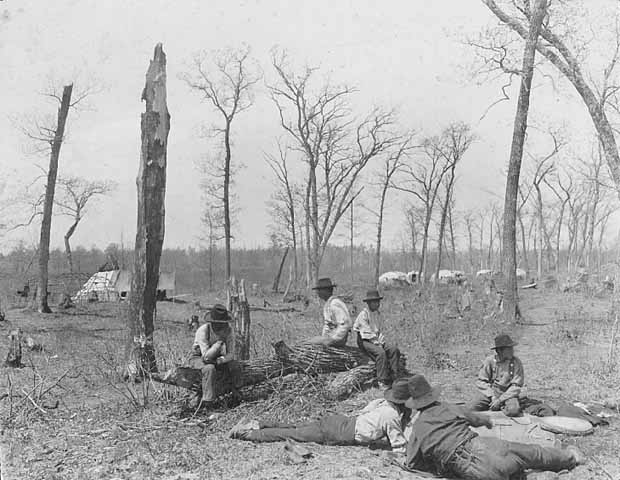
Chippewa people playing the moccasin game at Mille Lacs Indian Reservation, c. 1885

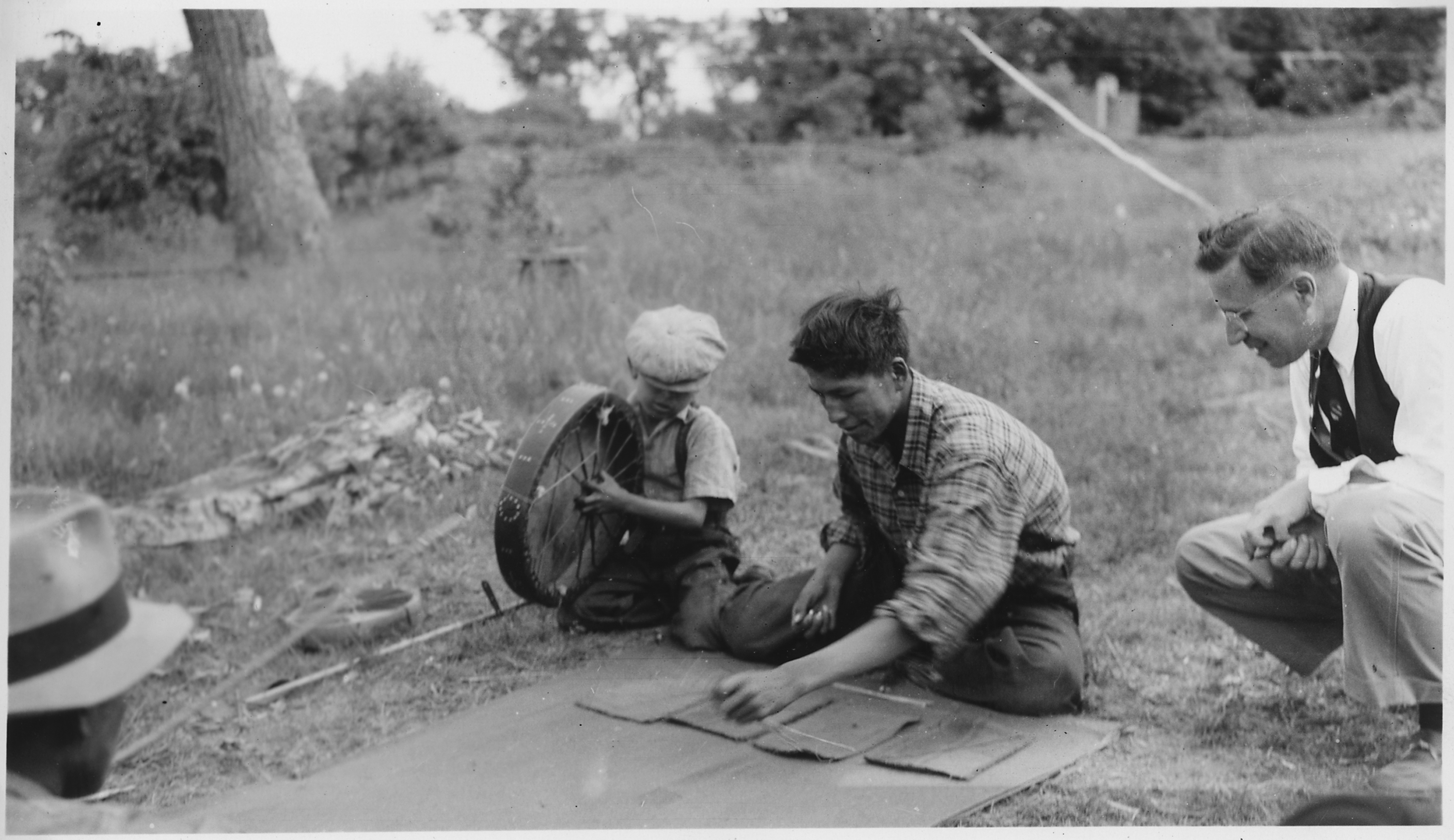
Young boys playing the moccasin game, c. 1938

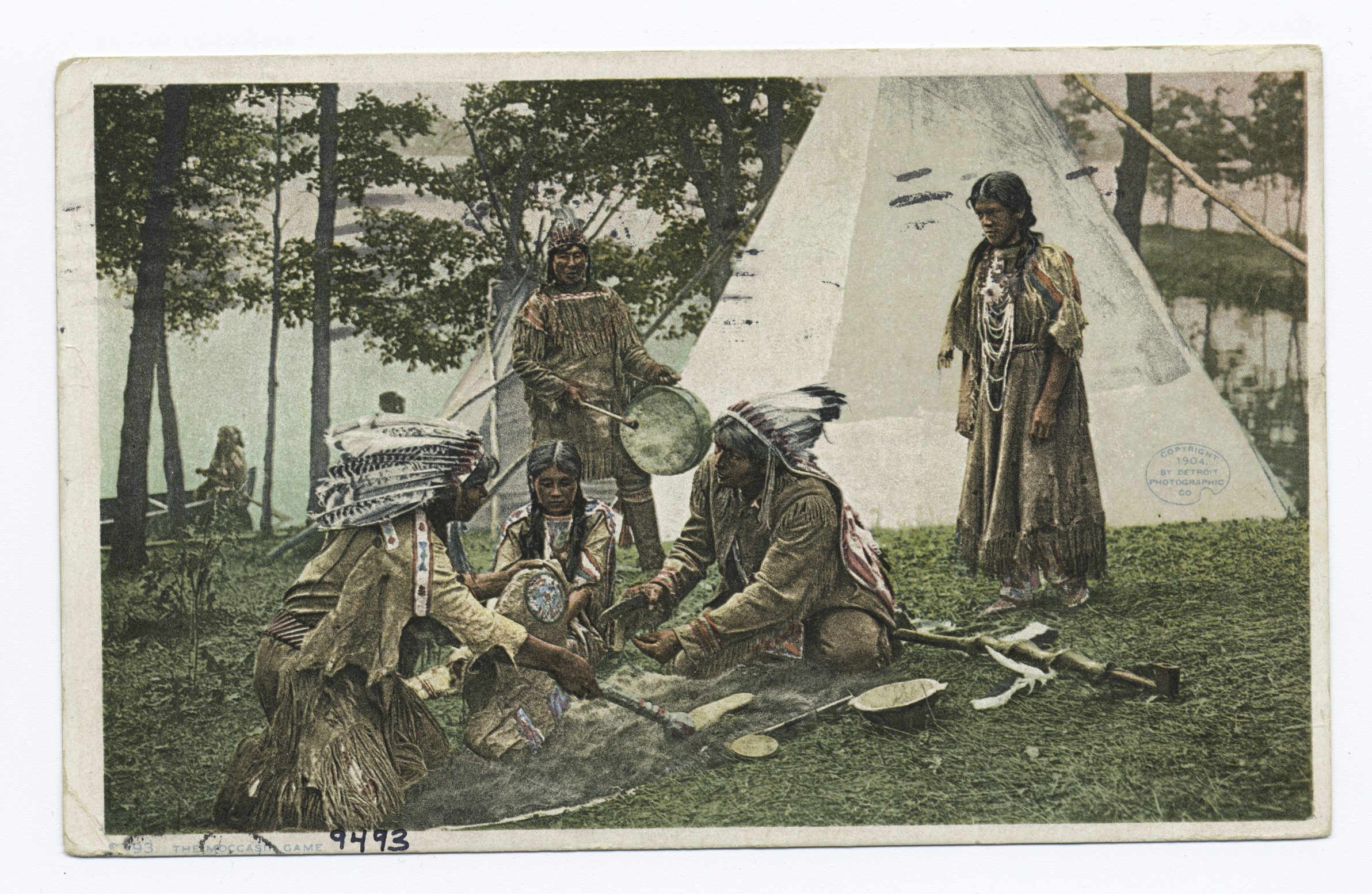
An 1898 postcard depicting a game in progress

== Haƞpap̣ena ==
In Dakota, the moccasin game is called haƞpap̣ena or "haƞpap̣ec̣uƞpi."

== Kah ==
The Apache version is known as Kah (literally translated as "foot"). Kah is described by Geronimo in his 1906 autobiography as told to S. M. Barrett. In the game, a bone is hidden inside one of four moccasins, and the opposing team must guess where it has been hidden. Kah was played at night, after a feast and dancing had been held to celebrate some notable event. The game usually involved gambling and was the most popular gambling game among the Apaches.

=== Game play ===
Kah involved two sides, one at first representing the feathered tribe, or birds, of the Apache creation story; the other representing the beasts. Each side might be one player or a team of any number.

The teams are separated by a campfire. On each side a row of four holes are dug about four feet (1.2 m) apart, and in each hole is placed a moccasin. The side representing the feathered tribe hangs blankets between the fire and them so that the team representing the beasts cannot see what they are doing, and then they begin to sing. They then place a bone in one of the four moccasins. The bone represents the sacred round white stone that the eagle dropped on the head of a monster, killing it and thereby benefiting mankind, in the creation story.

Once the bone has been hidden, the singing continues but the blankets are torn down, and a designated player of the beasts' side immediately runs up to and strikes one of the moccasins with a war club, having a one in four chance of finding the bone. If successful, the team of the beasts gets possession of the bone and have their turn representing the feathered tribe, singing and hiding the bone on their side of the campfire. Otherwise the hiding team keeps possession of the bone for the next round.

Scoring is kept by using a bundle of sticks. For each point scored, that team takes one stick. The game is over when no sticks are left, the side having the most sticks being declared the winner. Each game usually takes about four or five hours to play.

=== Variation ===
The Arizona Historical Society's web site says that the team representing the beasts does the singing while the birds' team hides the bone in one of the moccasins. If the singing team finds the bone they get a point but they do not get the bone. Rather, they get to sing and search again. That contradicts Geronimo's description, however.

== See also ==
- Shell game
