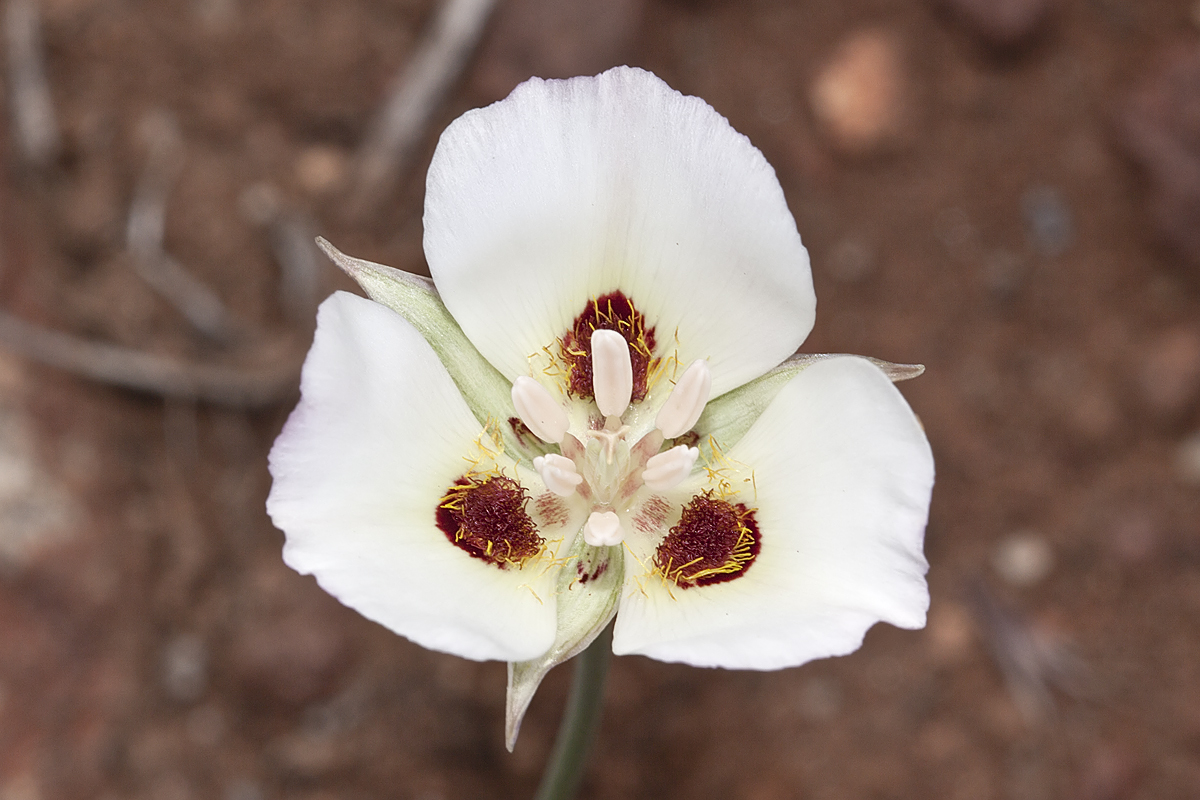

Conservation status
- Imperiled (NatureServe)

Scientific classification
- Kingdom: Plantae
- Clade: Tracheophytes
- Clade: Angiosperms
- Clade: Monocots
- Order: Liliales
- Family: Liliaceae
- Genus: Calochortus
- Species: C. dunnii

Binomial name
- Calochortus dunnii Purdy

= Calochortus dunnii =

Species of plant

Calochortus dunnii is a rare species of flowering plant in the lily family known by the common name Dunn's mariposa lily.

== Distribution ==
The plant is endemic to the Peninsular Ranges, native to southern San Diego County, California; and northern Baja California state, Mexico. It is known from only a few occurrences in chaparral, grassland, and Closed-cone coniferous forest habitats, at 185–1,830 feet (56–558 m) in elevation in the Cuyamaca Mountains, Laguna Mountains, and others.

== Description ==
Calochortus dunnii is a perennial herb growing a slender, branching stem up to 60 centimeters tall. The waxy, channeled basal leaf is 10 to 20 centimeters long and withers at flowering.

The inflorescence bears 2 to 6 erect bell-shaped flowers. Each flower has three sepals and three white or pinkish petals. The petals are up to 3 centimeters long and spotted with red and yellow near the bases, where there are patches of yellow hairs.

The fruit is a narrow, angled capsule 2 to 3 centimeters long.

== Conservation ==
Although the plant isn't seriously impacted by any one major problem, the main threat to the existence of this rare species is collecting by admirers of the attractive flowers.
