= Cerro Bola =

Mountain in Baja California, Mexico

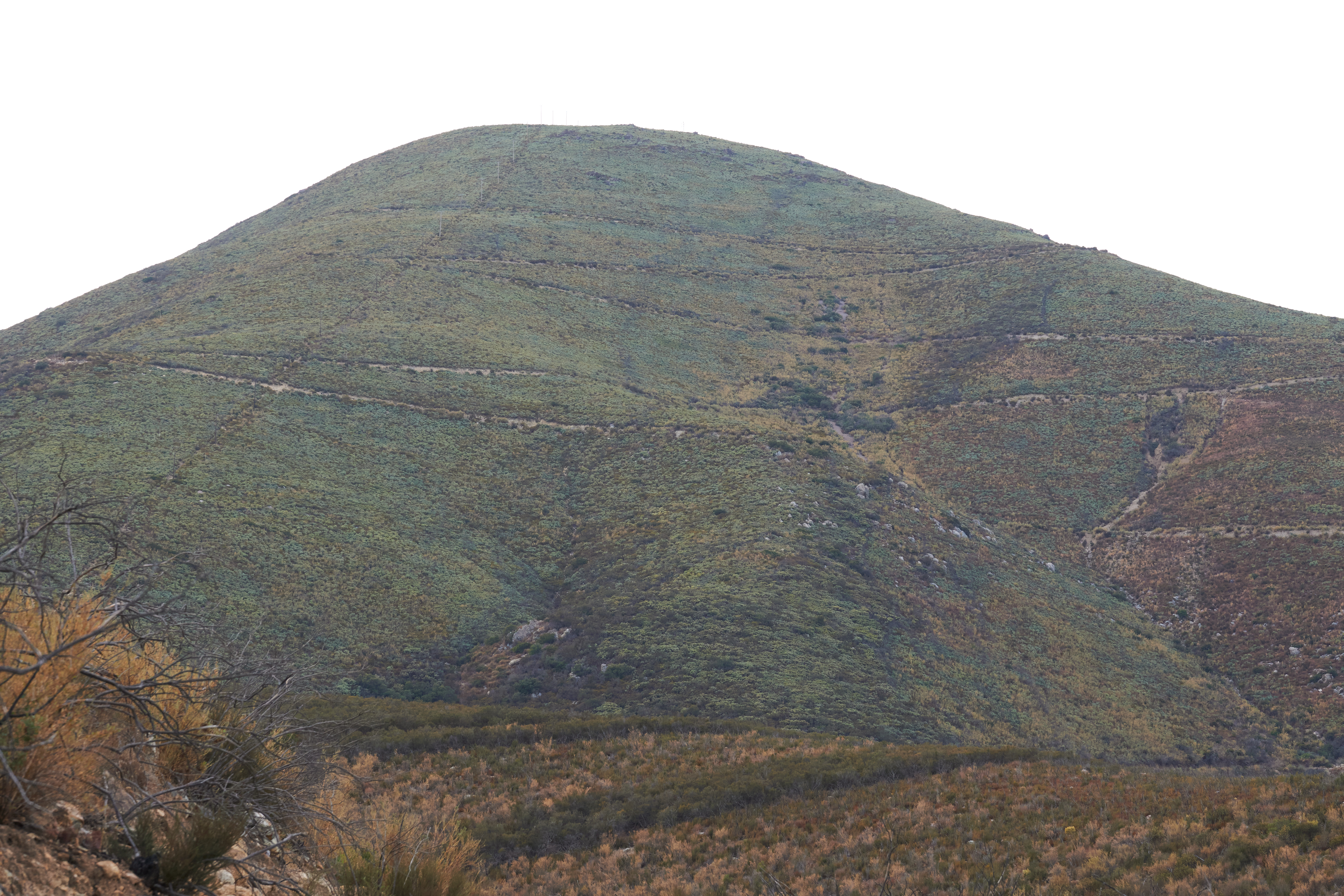
- View of the mountain in early winter before the arrival of winter rains

Highest point
- Elevation: 1,260 m (4,130 ft)
- Prominence: 720 m (2,360 ft)
- Isolation: 32.24 km (20.03 mi)

Geography
- Location within Baja California Location within Mexico
- Location: Baja California, Mexico
- Range coordinates: 32°18′50″N 116°39′54″W
- Topo map: San Luis I11D71 1:50,000

Geology
- Rock type: Metavolcanic rock

The Cerro Bola is a coastal metavolcanic mountain formation in northwestern Baja California. The Cerro Bola, along with the nearby mountain Cerro Gordo form the highest elevation areas of Tijuana Municipality. Because of its prominence, the transmitters for television station XHDTV and radio station XHPRS-FM are located on the summit of Cerro Bola, (Note: XHBCE-FM became XHPRS-FM in 2010) which reaches an elevation of 1,260 m (4,130 ft). It is located approximately 35 km (22 mi) south of the Tecate border crossing, and sits at the southwest end of the Valle de Las Palmas. The mountain range is host to a number of rare and endemic plant species, such as Arctostaphylos bolensis and Ceanothus bolensis.

== Geography ==
Situated at the southwestern end of the Valle de Las Palmas, but to the southeast of the Abelardo L. Rodríguez Dam, the Cerro Bola formation and its surroundings contains some of the highest points of Tijuana Municipality, reaching up to 1,260 m (4,130 ft) in elevation. The Cerro Bola and the Cerro Gordo form the two prominent metavolcanic peaks in the area, while to the south of the peaks, the landscape transforms into volcanic tablelands.

== Hiking ==
A 7 km (4.3 mi) out-and-back trail (SP-CBO-10 "Cerro Bola") provides access to the summit of the mountain, offering panoramic views at the top. The strenuous hike is a Class 2 on the Yosemite Decimal System and takes about 3 hours to complete, with an elevation gain of about 988 m (3,241 ft). The trail was inaugurated in November of 2019 by the Secretary of Sustainable Economy and Tourism of the State of Baja California, Mario Escobedo Carignan, as part of an effort to increase the number of destinations in the region for nature tourism and hiking. The project was financed by the Tecate Economic Development Commission. The trailhead is located in the Valle de Las Palmas, off of Mexican Federal Highway 3.

== Ecology ==
The Cerro Bola and Cerro Gordo formation are a representative of a "sky island" coastal bioclimatic zone, which includes other mountains such as Otay, Sycuan, McGinty, Cerro San Ysidro, and Tecate Peak. These mountains all hold some of the largest remaining areas of intact Diegan coastal sage scrub, mafic chaparral, and gabbroic and metavolcanic soils that support numerous endemic plant species. The mafic chaparral on the Cerro Bola hosts endemic species, alongside distributions of some other rare species only found on the other "sky islands." The pristine status of the habitat and number of rare and endemic plants have made the area of high priority to conservationists.

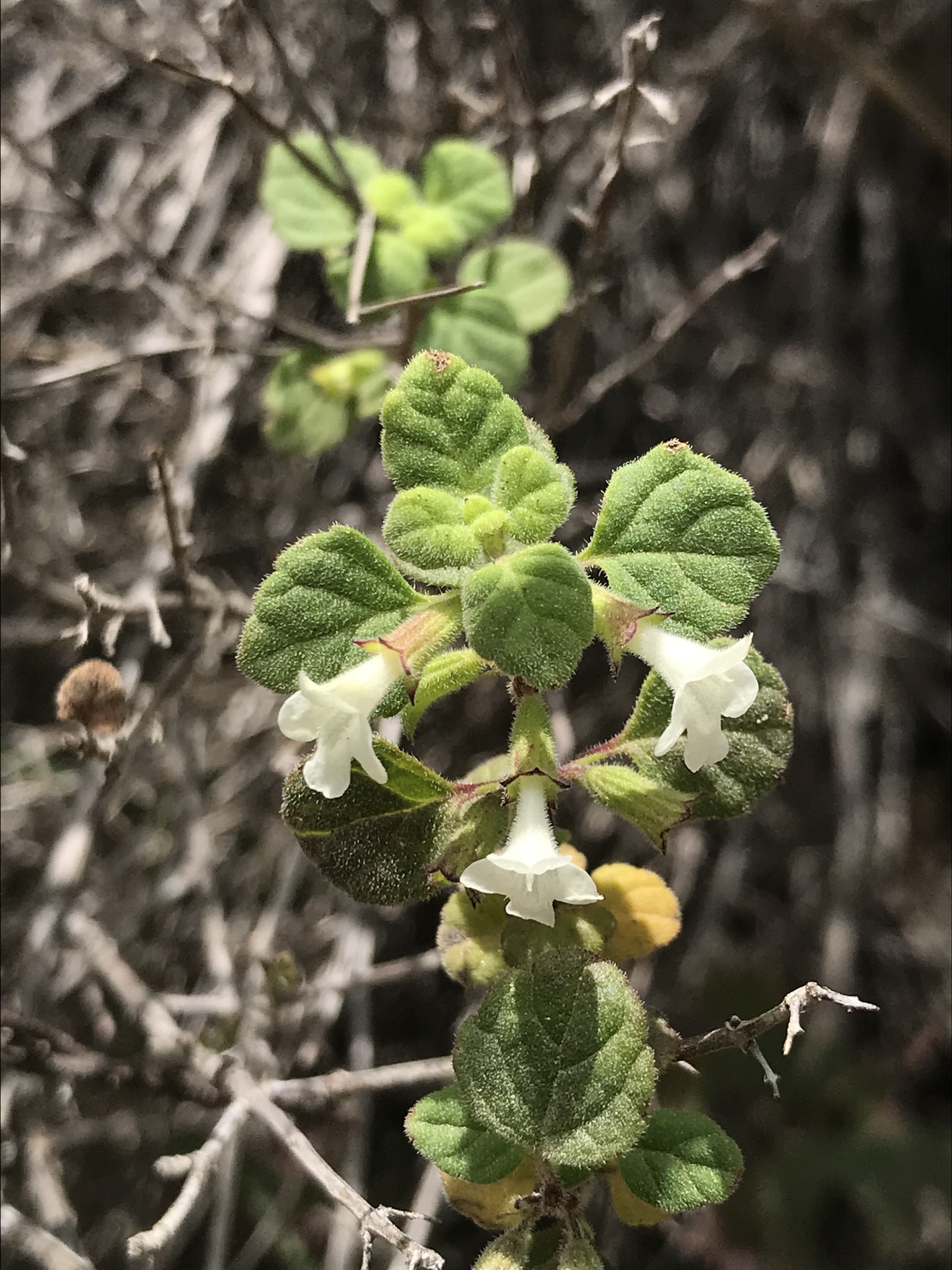
Clinopodium chandleri, on the north slope of the Cerro Bola, photographed by Sula Vanderplank.

In the mafic chaparral, two endemic species are found, the Bola manzanita, Arctostaphylos bolensis and the Bola ceanothus, Ceanothus bolensis. C. bolensis is frequently found on the mountain from elevations of 1,000 m (3,300 ft) to the peak at 1,290 m (4,230 ft), and less commonly found from at least 500 m (1,600 ft), commonly occurring with Chamaebatia australis.

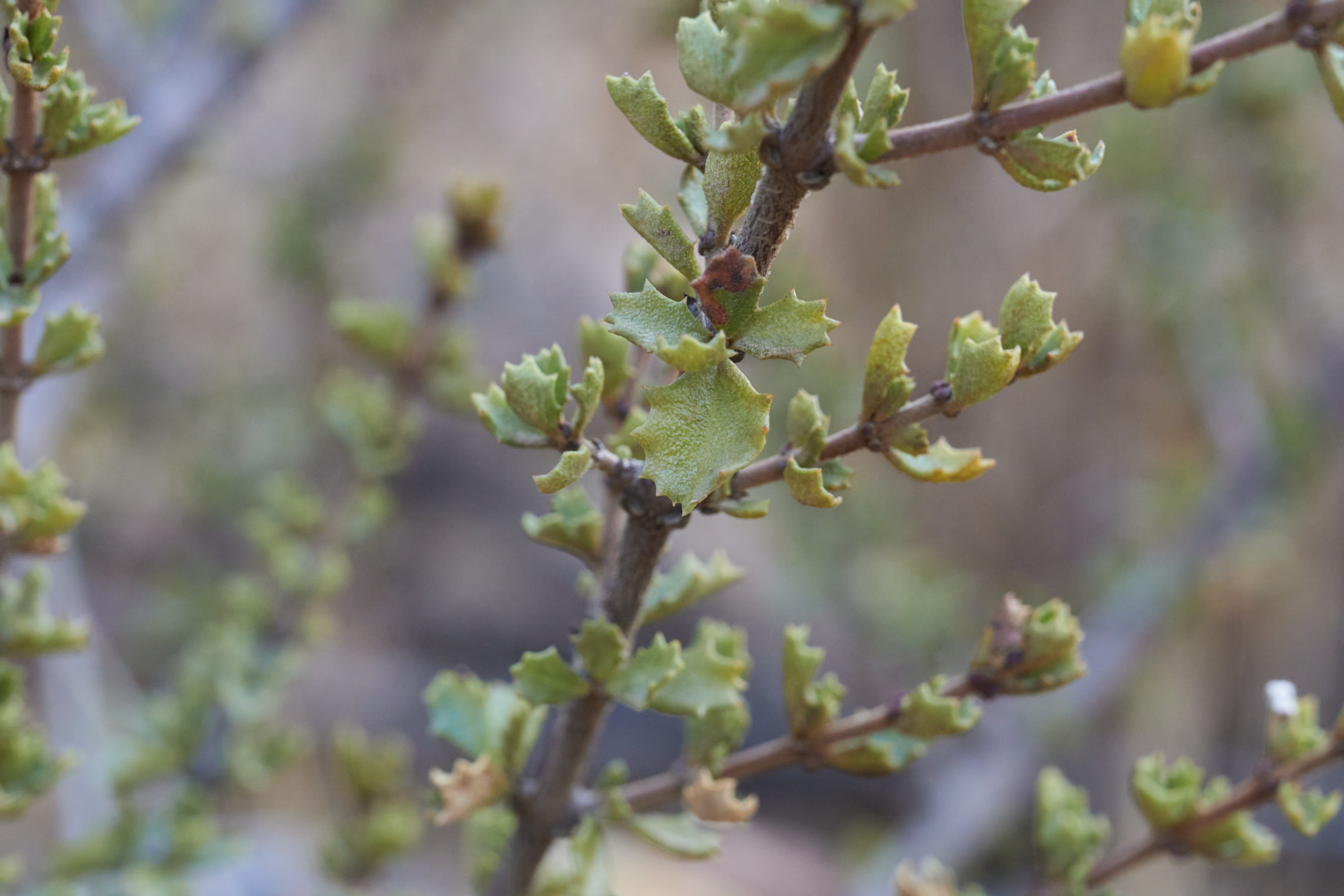
Ceanothus bolensis on the north slope of the mountain

Large groves of Cupressus forbesii are present in the foothills and mesas in the southern part of the mountain range, with some occasional stands of Pinus attenuata among them. Canyon live oak, Quercus chrysolepis, is also present in northern exposures of peaks in the range. Ceanothus papillosus only appears in Baja California on this peak. Some rare fragrant shrubs in the mint family are also present on the mountain. The heart-leaf pitcher sage, Lepechinia cardiophylla, is found on the mountain's peak, along with San Miguel savory, Clinopodium chandleri, which can be found on the chaparral of the north slope.

On the eastern side of the Cerro Bola, the westernmost population of California fan palm, Washingtonia filifera, is found. Growing in arroyos and canyons draining down from the mountain, it is also the only natural population of fan palm found on the western side of the Peninsular Ranges divide. Surrounding the mountain in the clay terraces of the Valle de Las Palmas are numerous vernal pools, which include rare species such as Navarretia prostrata and an undescribed species of Pogogyne.

== See also ==
- Otay Mountain
- Otay Mountain Wilderness
- San Diego National Wildlife Refuge
- San Miguel Mountain
- Tecate Peak
- McGinty Mountain
- Lepechinia ganderi
- Arctostaphylos otayensis
- XHDTV
