= McGinty Mountain =

Stream in the American state of California

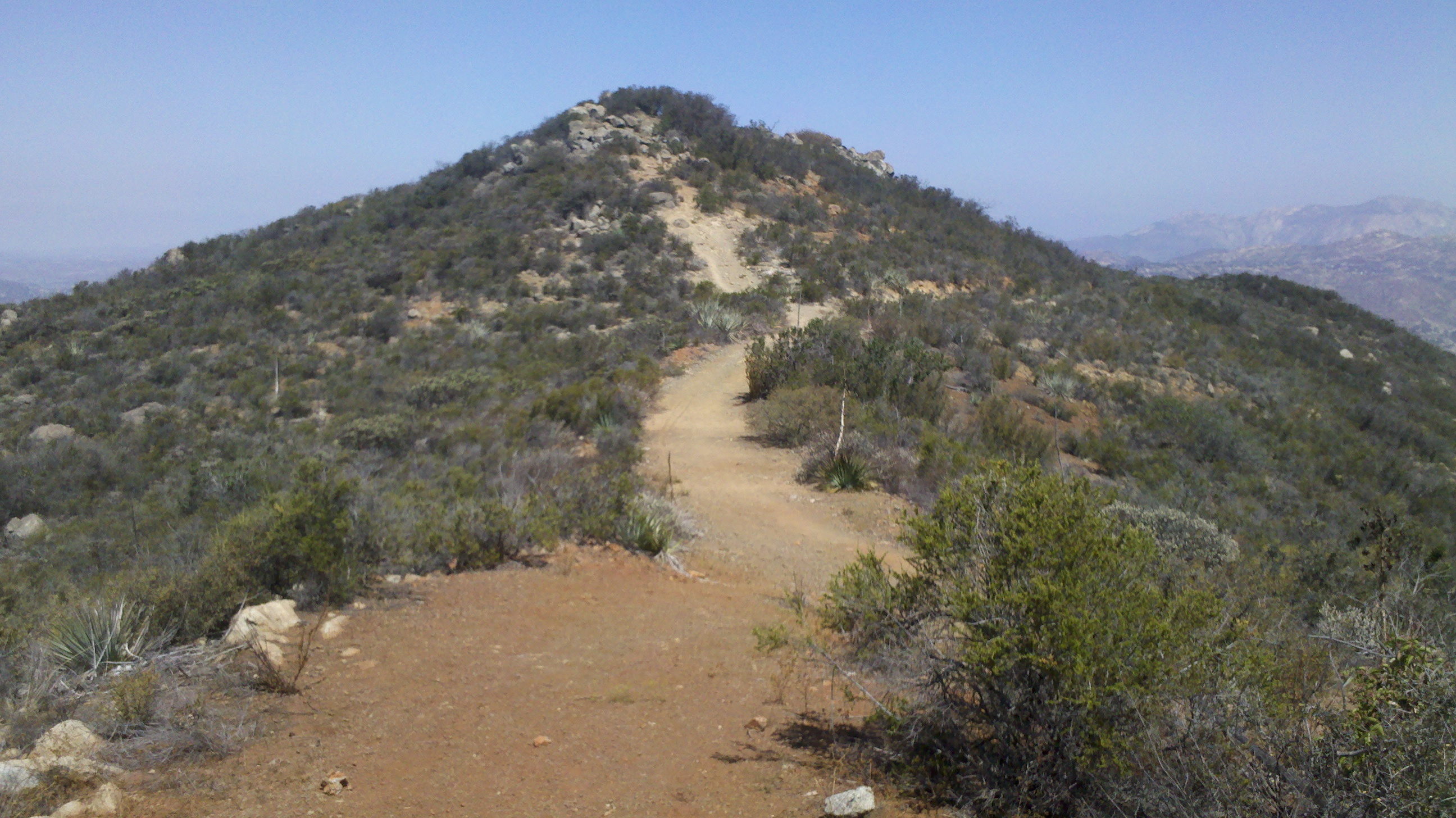
- Top of McGinty Mountain

Highest point
- Elevation: 2,185 ft (666 m) NAVD 88
- Prominence: 223 ft (68 m)
- Isolation: 1.39 mi (2.24 km)
- Coordinates: 32°44′27″N 116°50′18″W

Geography
- Location within San Diego County, California
- Location: San Diego County, California, U.S.
- Topo map: USGS Dulzura

Climbing
- Easiest route: Trail Hike class 1

McGinty Mountain is a gabbroic mountain located in San Diego County, California near Jamul. Because of the gabbroic soil, the mountain supports numerous rare and endemic plant species, including half of California's population of the Dehesa nolina (Nolina interrata). The mountain belongs to an ecological preserve collectively managed by The Nature Conservancy, the California Department of Fish and Wildlife, and the San Diego National Wildlife Refuge. The mountain is accessible through a 4.7 mi (7.6 km) long out-and-back hiking trail.

== History ==
During the 1900s, silicified alaskite aplite was mined for use in porcelain wares production. The name of the miner was McGinty, thus giving the mountain its name. The visible remains of the old mine can be found along the climb towards the summit. Several more mines exist on the mountain, but they are less readily visible. The old mines should not be entered due to the risks of collapse, falls from the vertical shafts, noxious gasses and rattlesnakes that shelter there during the day.

The mines are sometimes referred to as "Peg Leg mine," and a local road bears the name Peg Leg Mine Road. This is a result of local legend associating the mines on McGinty with the gold-bearing "Lost Pegleg Mine" of Thomas "Peg Leg" Smith.

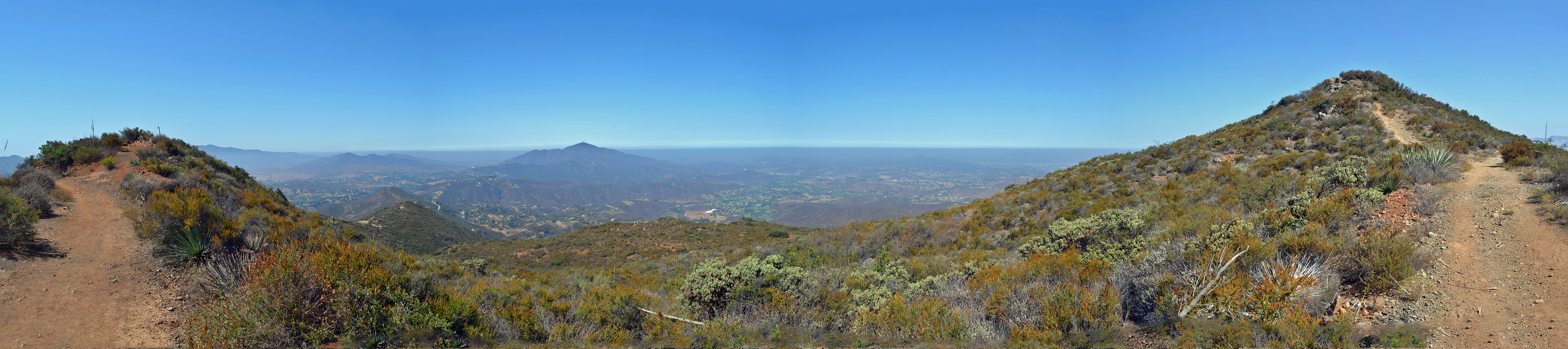
Panorama from the top of McGinty Mountain

== Ecology ==
This mountain is a member of a distinctive coastal "sky island" bioclimatic zone found in San Diego County and northwestern Baja California, which harbor numerous rare and endemic species due to their geologic composition, usually consisting of gabbroic, mafic, and metavolcanic soils. The gabbro-derived soil (Las Posas stony fine sandy loam) on McGinty is characterized by low levels of major nutrients necessary for plant life, like phosphorus, calcium, and potassium, and high levels of heavy metals such as nickel, chromium, and cobalt.

=== Flora ===
The mountain is host to a number of rare and endemic species, which include:

- San Diego thornmint (Acanthomintha illicifolia) – An annual herb found growing on the southwestern slope of the mountain. A member of the mint family, characterized by white to pink to purple flowers in spring. Typically found growing in southeast to west facing slopes in clay lenses with friable soil. An endangered species, it has lost nearly 90% of its habitat from urbanization.
- San Miguel savory (Clinopodium chandleri) – An aromatic perennial shrub found throughout the mountain. Also a member of the mint family, it is characterized by small white flowers and leaves with a fragrance similar to mint. Distributed on other mountains in the same bioclimatic zone, such as San Miguel Mountain and the Cerro Bola. It is an imperiled species threatened by development and restricted to regionally uncommon metavolcanic and gabbroic soils.
- Parry's tetracoccus (Tetracoccus dioicus) – A perennial shrub found in the chaparral, typically on dry and stony hillsides and slopes. In the Picrodendraceae family. In the springtime, it is characterized by clusters of small red flowers, and later distinctive four-lobed fruits. Restricted to uncommon gabbro derived soils in southern California and northern Baja California. Threatened by development and agriculture, particularly by clearing for citrus and avocado orchards.
- Dehesa nolina (Nolina interrata) – A perennial rosette-forming monocot, found towards the summit of the mountain. In the subfamily Convallarioideae of the Asparagaceae, somewhat related to agaves and similar-looking local plants like chaparral yucca (Hesperoyucca whipplei). It is characterized by large, blue-gray, grass-like foliage. Over half of California's population of this plant are found along the ridgeline of McGinty.

Other common plants along the trail and mountain include the fragrant Cleveland sage (Salvia clevelandii).

Flora of McGinty Mountain

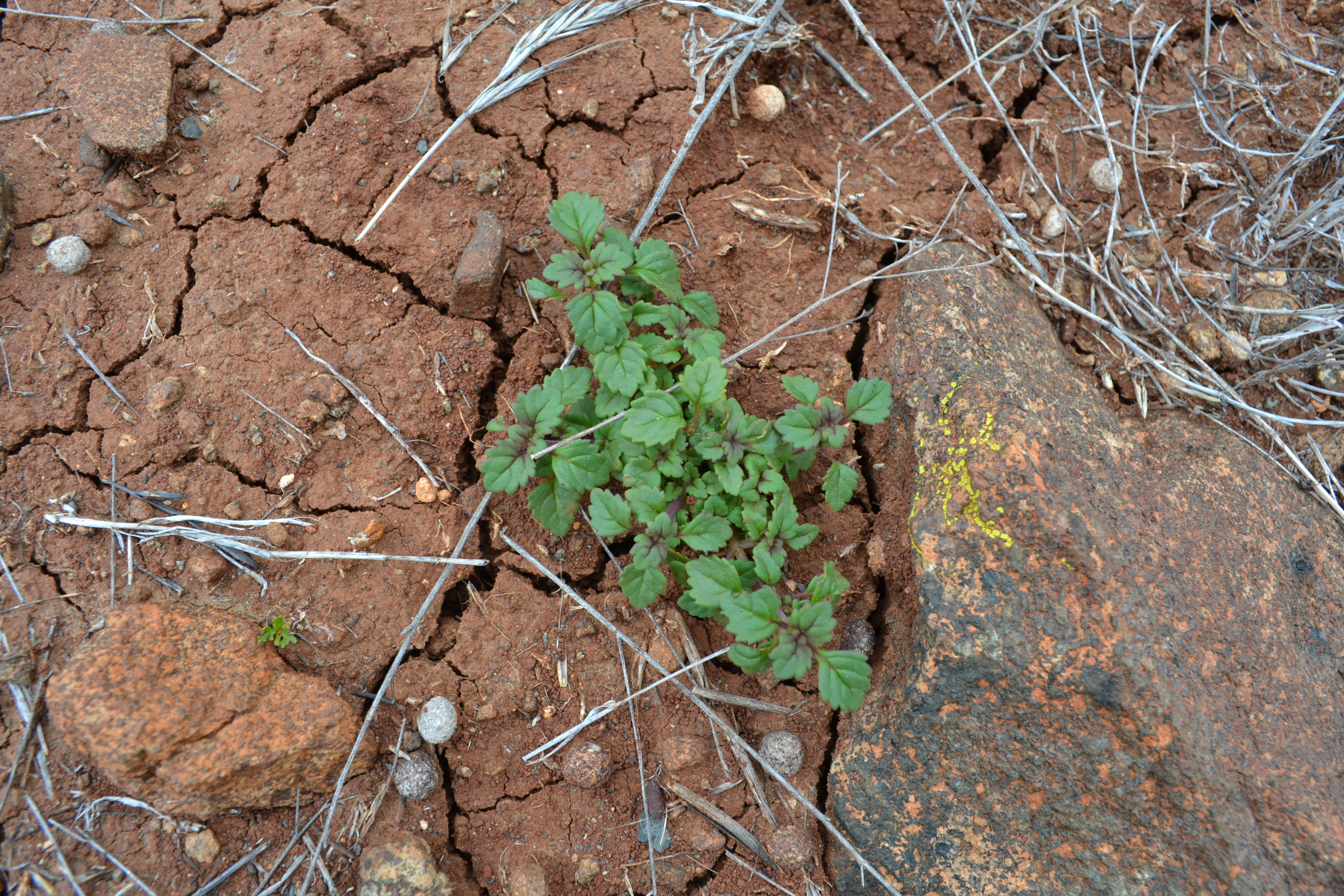
San Diego thornmint on McGinty Mountain

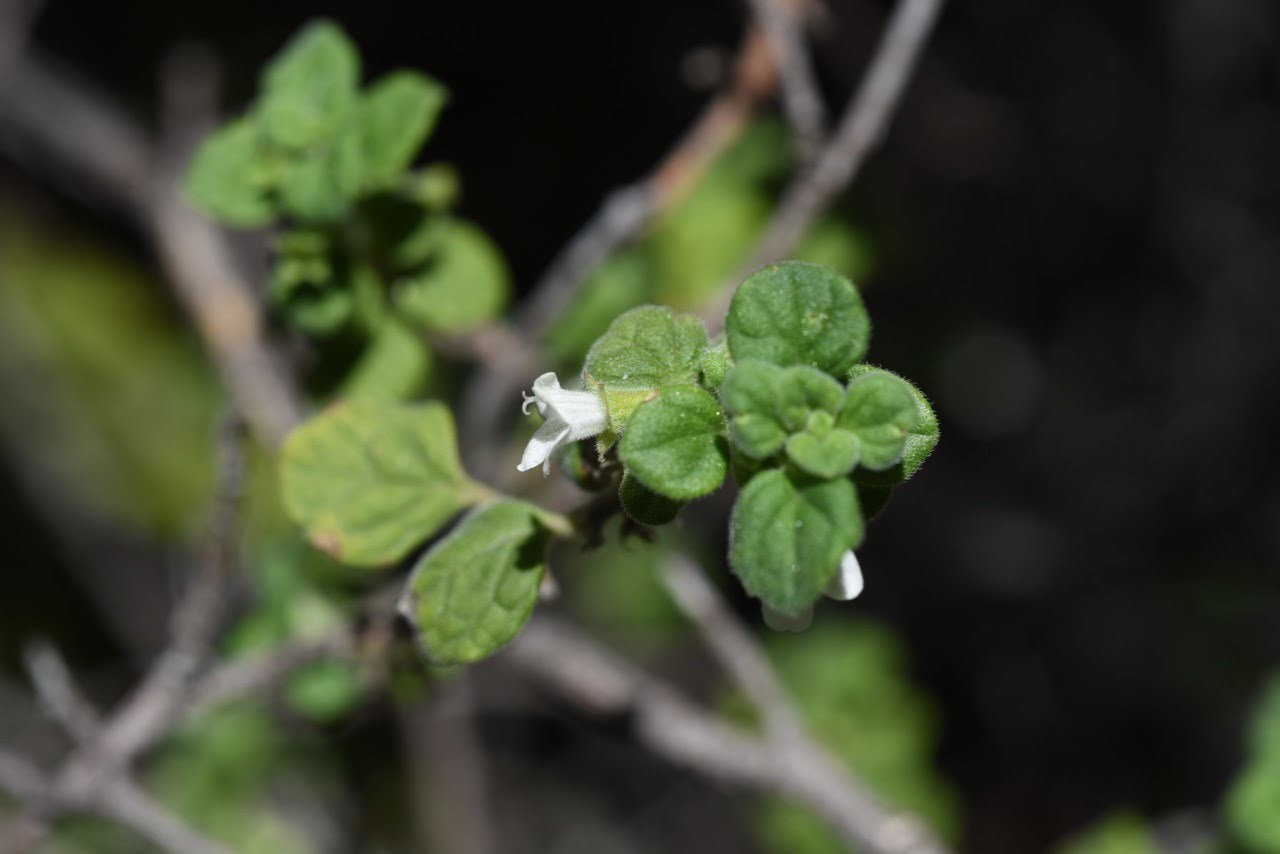
San Miguel savory

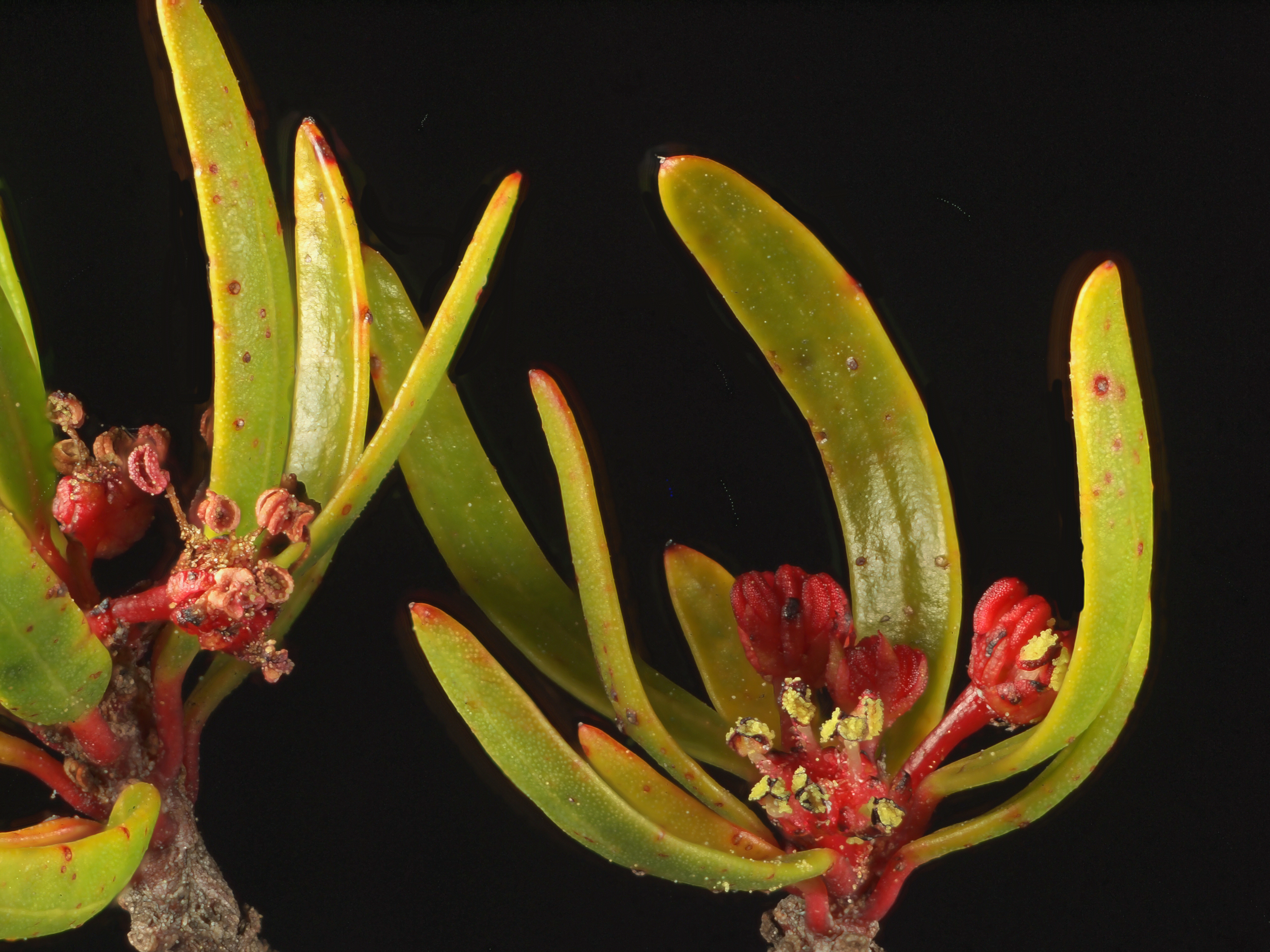
Parry's tetracoccus

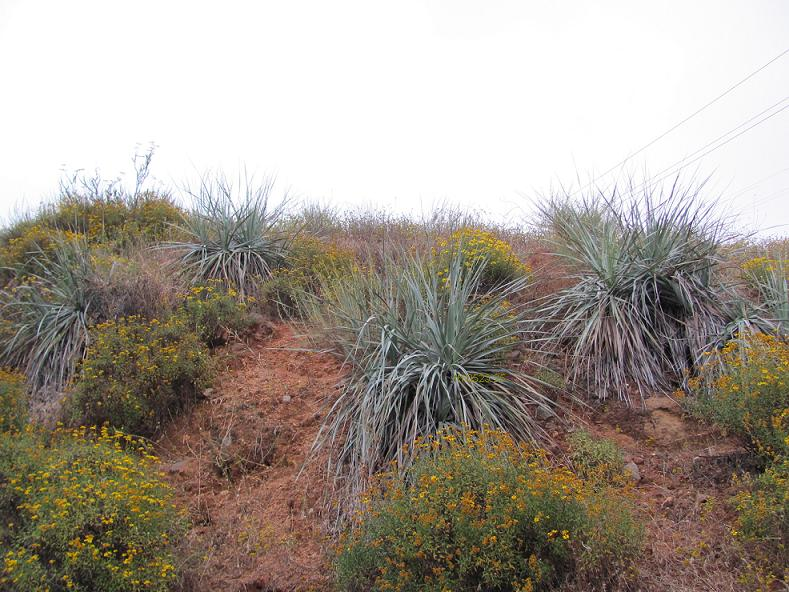
Dehesa nolina

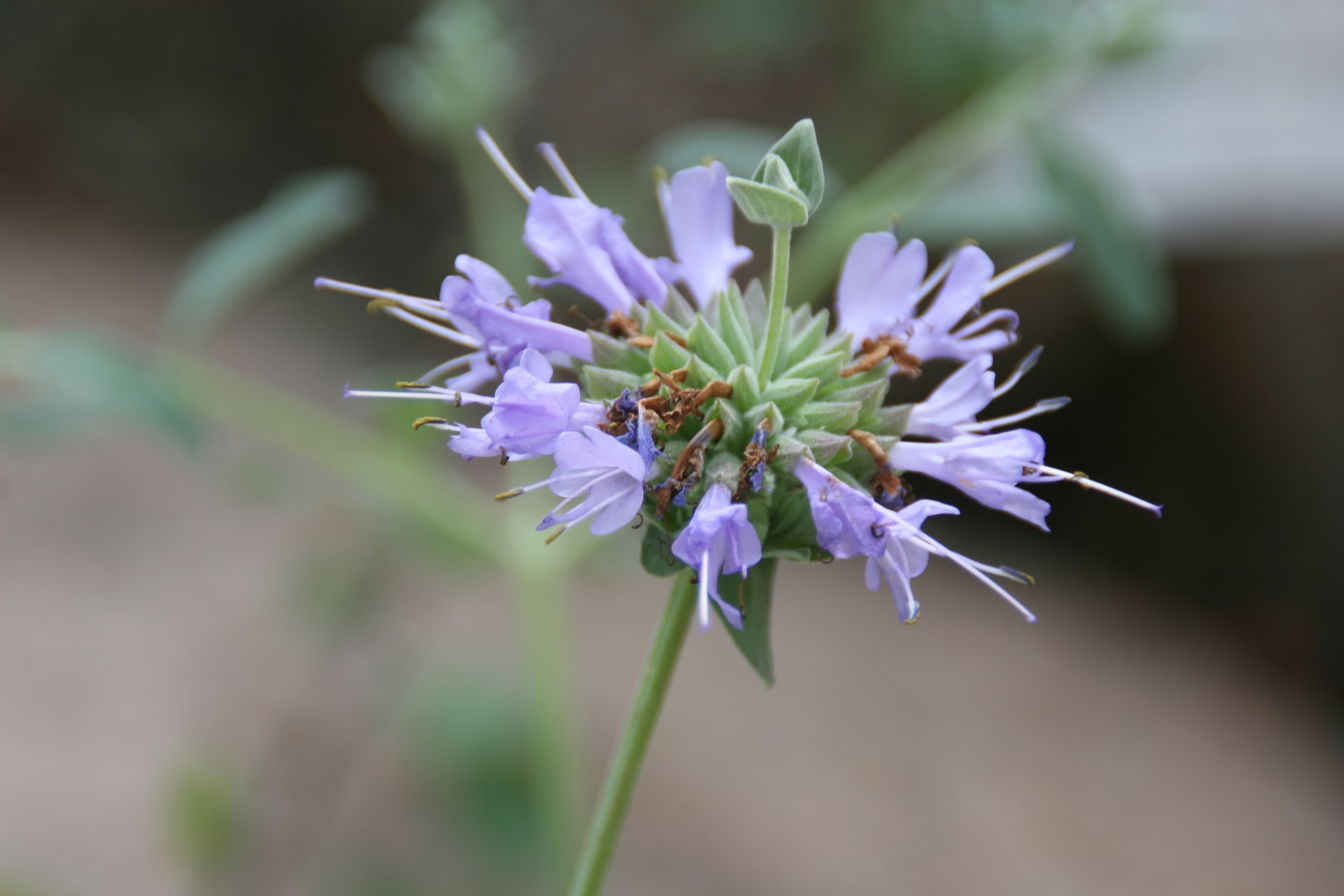
Cleveland sage

== See also ==
- Otay Mountain
- Otay Mountain Wilderness
- San Diego National Wildlife Refuge
- San Miguel Mountain
- Tecate Peak
- Cerro Bola

== Bibliography ==
- Lindsay, Diana; Knoll, Paula; Varnell, Terri (2016). Coast to Cactus. San Diego, California: Sunbelt Publications, Inc. ISBN 9781941384206. LCCN 2016005617.
- The Canyoneers (January 27, 2016). "Mind the endangered species on McGinty Mountain". San Diego Reader.
- Deal, Chad (January 19, 2013). "Jamul: the legends, lies, and mines of Mt. McGinty". San Diego Reader.
- "Las Californias Binational Conservation Initiative 2015: a decadal review of conservation status of the California-Baja California border region". Conservation Biology Institute. June 2015.
- Reiser, Craig H. (July 2001). Rare Plants of San Diego County (PDF). Aquafir Press. ASIN B0006F4BAY.
