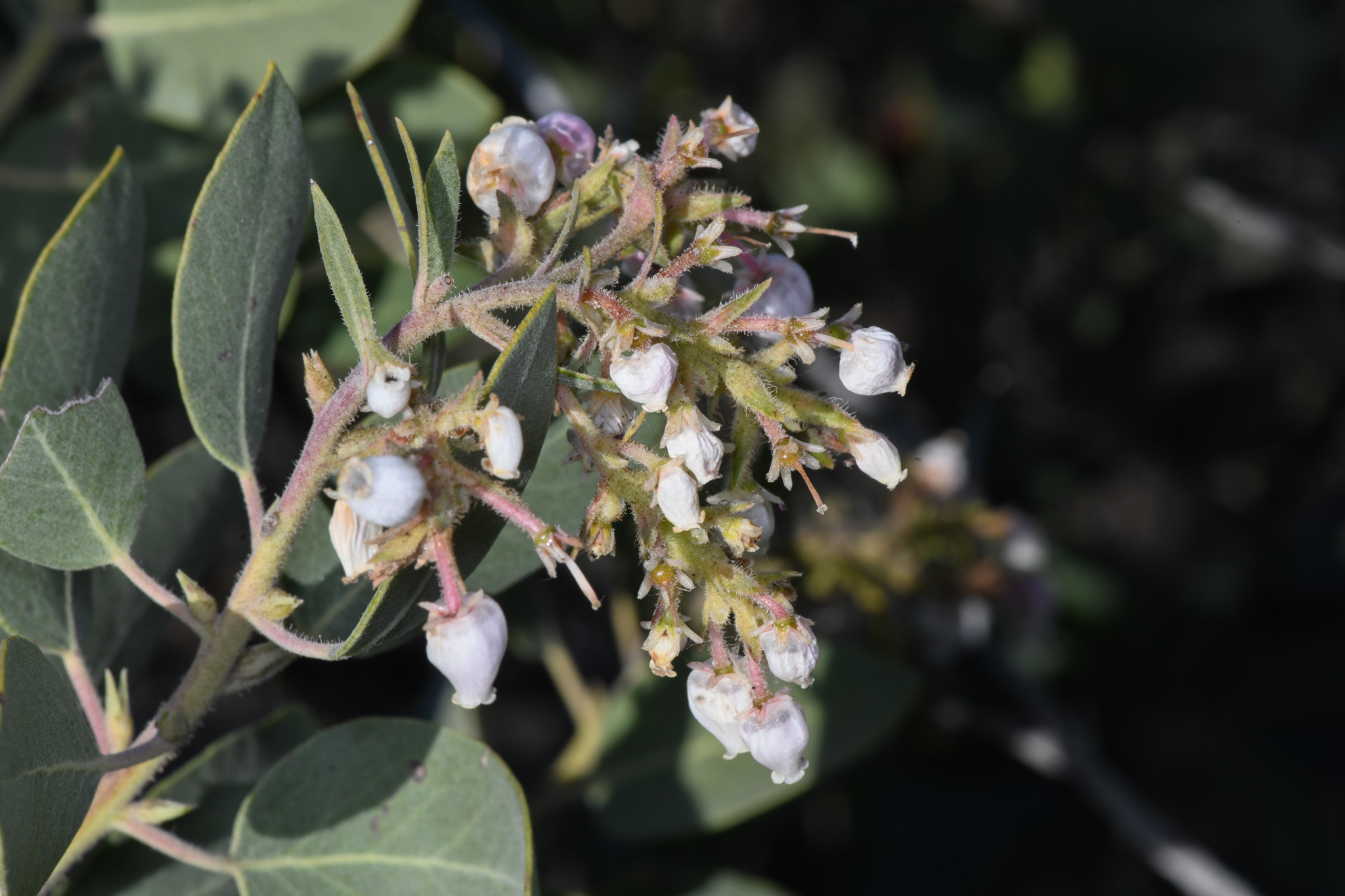

Conservation status
- Critically Imperiled (NatureServe)

Scientific classification
- Kingdom: Plantae
- Clade: Tracheophytes
- Clade: Angiosperms
- Clade: Eudicots
- Clade: Asterids
- Order: Ericales
- Family: Ericaceae
- Genus: Arctostaphylos
- Species: A. otayensis

Binomial name
- Arctostaphylos otayensis Wiesl. & B. Schrieb.

= Arctostaphylos otayensis =

Species of flowering plant

Arctostaphylos otayensis is a species of manzanita commonly known as the Otay manzanita. It is a rare perennial shrub native to the mountains of southwestern San Diego County, California and northwestern Baja California, where it grows in chaparral habitats on metavolcanic soils, mostly in the San Ysidro Mountains. The white urn-shaped flowers bloom from winter to spring. Because of the small range of this species and a number of threats, it is of conservation concern.

== Description ==
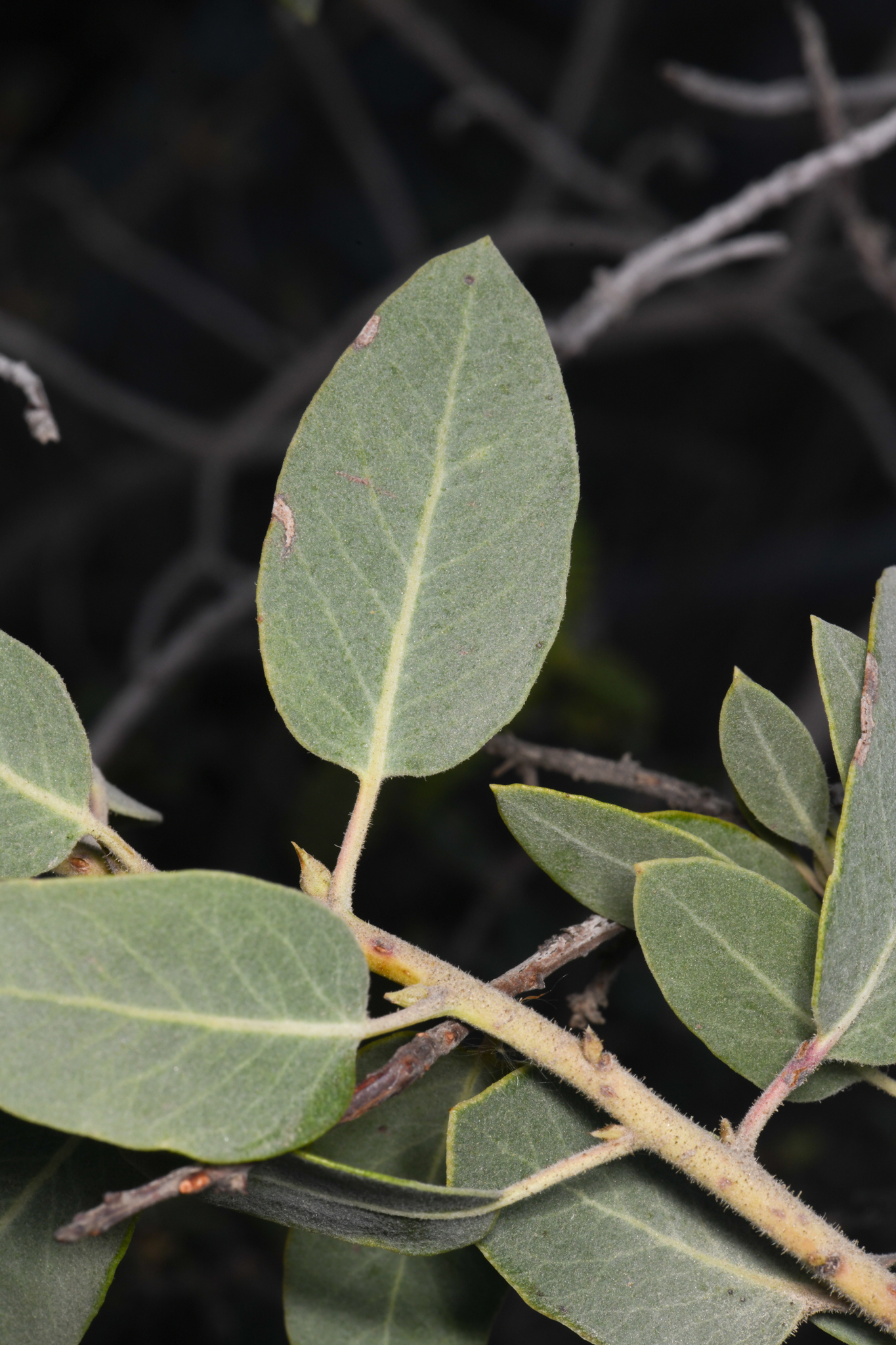
Detail of the leaves

Arctostaphylos otayensis is an erect or mound-forming shrub, 1–3 m (3.3–9.8 ft) tall. It lacks a burl, and has twigs that are sparsely covered in short hairs and long glandular hairs. The leaves are erect, borne on petioles 5–8 mm (0.20–0.31 in) long. The base of the leaf near the petiole has a rounded or truncate shape. The leaves have a gray-glaucous color and are narrowly elliptic or oblong-elliptic to ovate in shape, measuring 2–3 cm (0.79–1.18 in) long by 1–2 cm (0.39–0.79 in) wide.

The inflorescence is a panicle with 4 to 7 branches. The young inflorescence branches have an erect or ascending orientation, and are covered in hairs like those on the twigs. The inflorescence is covered in leaflike bracts. The flowers are attached to pedicels 3–8 mm (0.12–0.31 in) long. The flowers are white, with a conic to urceolate shape, and with an ovary covered in dense white hairs. Flowering is from winter to early spring. The fruits are globose in shape, mostly lacking hairs, and are 6–8 mm (0.24–0.31 in) in diameter.

== Taxonomy ==
Arctostaphylos otayensis was described in 1939 by botanists Albert E. Wieslander and Beryl O. Schreiber in Madroño. The type specimen was collected by H. A. Jensen on Otay Mountain on November 3, 1937, with the specific epithet derived from the type locality. Wieslander and Schreiber noted that A. otayensis resembled A. glandulosa in many respects, but differed in its lack of a burl and characteristically small and pale brown fruits.

== Distribution and habitat ==
Arctostaphylos otayensis is mostly restricted to the San Ysidro Mountains of San Diego County, California and Tijuana Municipality, Baja California. Smaller populations occur on neighboring San Miguel Mountain to the north, and to the south near La Misión.

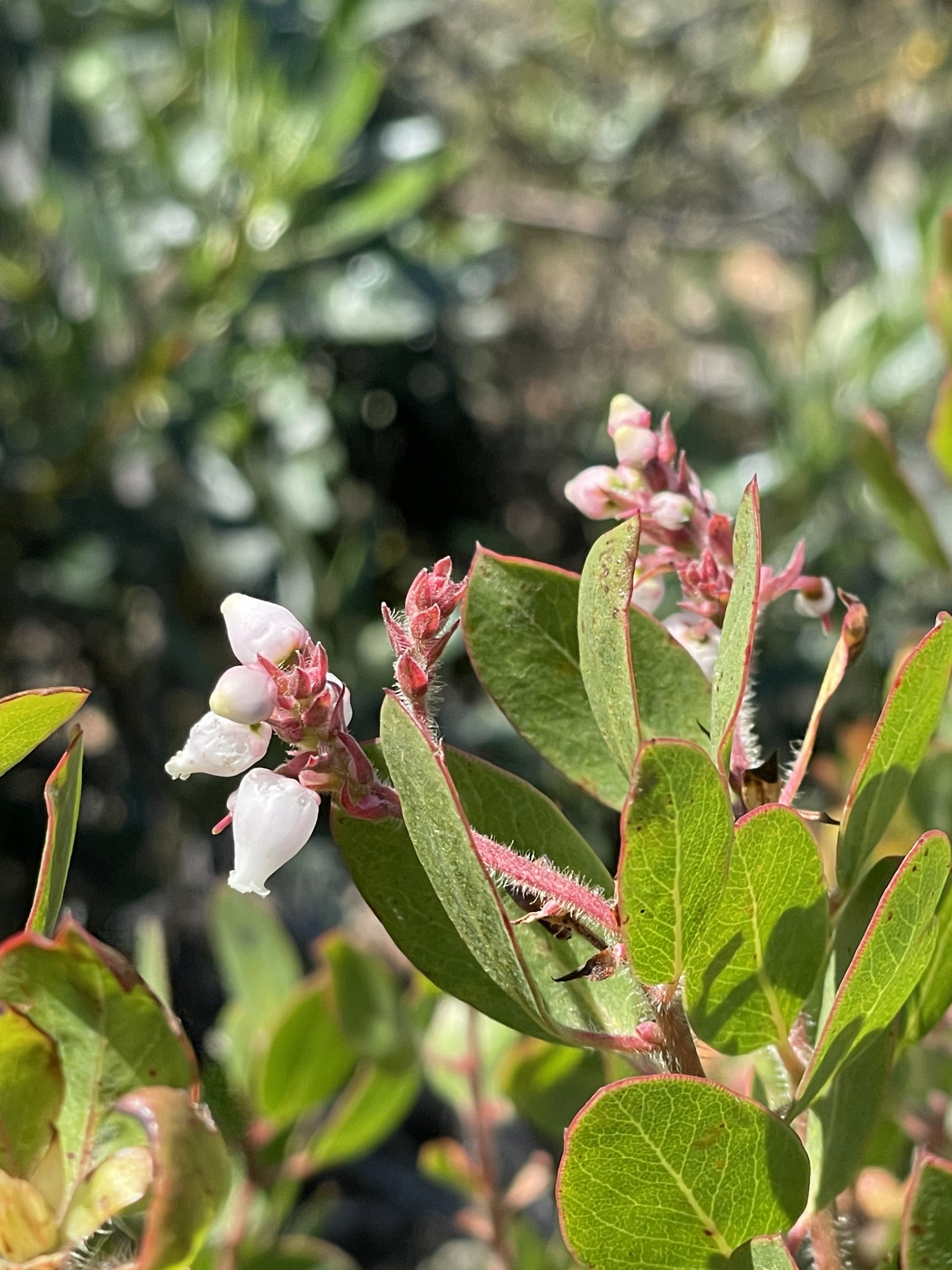
Flowering in Baja California

A. otayensis is found in chaparral and cismontane woodland habitats in metavolcanic soils, where it occurs on rocky slopes or outcrops. Associates in chaparral include Adenostoma fasciculatum, Arctostaphylos glandulosa, Malosma laurina, Ceanothus, and Chamaebatia australis. In Tecate cypress associations, it occurs with Xylococcus bicolor, A. glandulosa, Cercocarpus betuloides, Comarostaphylis diversifolia, and C. australis. The San Ysidro Mountains are an ancient volcanic system which supports a high number of endemic taxa like A. otayensis possibly limited to the metavolcanic rocks and soils. As this species lacks a burl, it cannot resprout after intense fires.

== Conservation ==
Arctostaphylos otayensis is ranked as a G1 Critically Imperiled species by NatureServe because of its small distribution, threats, and declining number of occurrences. Out of the 18 known occurrences of A. otayensis in San Diego County, 15 are historic and may also be extirpated. Threats include development, roads, trampling, and improper fire regimes. The San Diego Zoo Wildlife Alliance and California Botanic Garden work to conserve this species.
