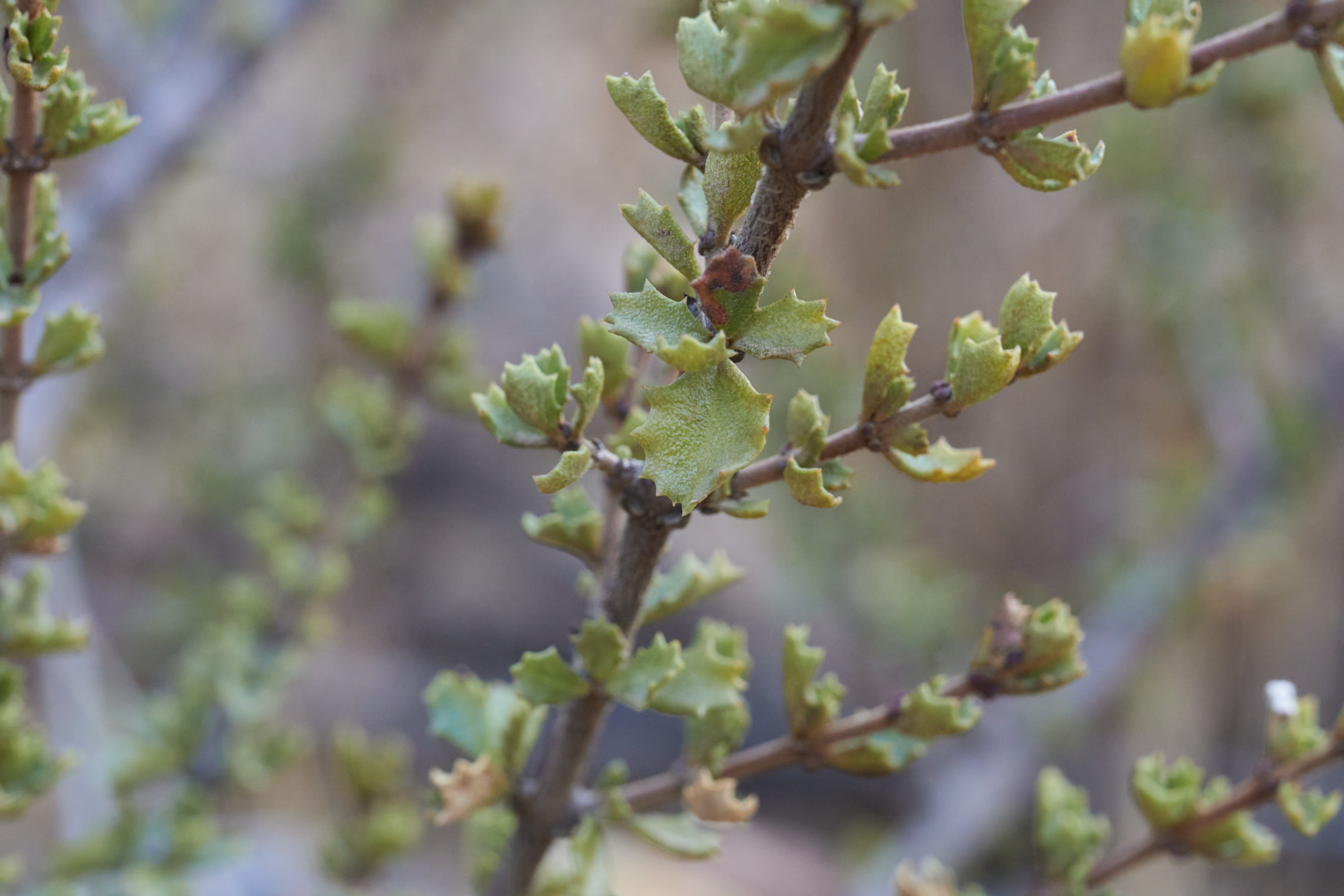
- Growing on the north slope of Cerro Bola

Scientific classification
- Kingdom: Plantae
- Clade: Tracheophytes
- Clade: Angiosperms
- Clade: Eudicots
- Clade: Rosids
- Order: Rosales
- Family: Rhamnaceae
- Genus: Ceanothus
- Subgenus: C. subg. Cerastes
- Species: C. bolensis

Binomial name
- Ceanothus bolensis S. Boyd and J. Keeley (2002)

= Ceanothus bolensis =

Species of buckthorn

Ceanothus bolensis is a species of shrub in the buckthorn family commonly known as the Cerro Bola ceanothus. It is a rare member of the genus Ceanothus endemic to mountains with metavolcanic soils in extreme northwestern Baja California, Mexico. It is named after the Cerro Bola, a basaltic peak where the species is especially common and was first described from.

== Description ==
Ceanothus bolensis is a shrub growing approximately 1–1.5 m (3.3–4.9 ft) in height and lacking a basal burl. It has small leaves measuring 4–6 mm (0.16–0.24 in) long by 4–7 mm (0.16–0.28 in) wide with a broadly obovate to oblanceolate shape, and deeply concave. The margins of the leaves are sharply dentate towards their distal ends, with 2 to 3 pairs of teeth and a tooth at the apex. The underside of the leaf has a prominent midvein. The leaves are smooth and lack hair (except when young, when they are sparsely hairy) and are colored a yellowish-green with a thick, leathery texture. The leaves are evergreen, and are arranged oppositely, and often grow clustered on short spur branches emerging from the axils. The inflorescence is a sub-umbellate axillary raceme. The flowers are pale blue and fade to a cream white in age. The fruits are globose and lack horns.

C. bolensis is superficially similar to Ceanothus perplexans with its lack of fruiting horns and deeply concave, toothed leaves, but has much smaller, glabrous leaves. The smaller leaves are characteristic of Ceanothus ophiochilus, from which it also differs with a markedly different broadly obovate or broadly oblanceolate leaf shape. Ceanothus otayensis is another narrowly endemic species in the same region that can be distinguished from C. bolensis by its leaves that lack concavity, are hairy (tomentulose), and have revolute (rolled or curved inward) margins.

== Taxonomy ==
C. bolensis was described in 2002 by botanists Steve Boyd and Jon E. Keeley. The type specimen is a collection made by Keeley from the Cerro Bola in 1996. The paratypes cited include a 1970 collection by Reid Moran It is placed within the Ceanothus subgenus Cerastes.

== Distribution and habitat ==
Ceanothus bolensis is extremely range restricted and was originally described as being endemic to the mid-to-high elevations of Cerro Bola peak, but is now known from a handful of other mountains in northwestern Baja California between Tecate and Ensenada. The distribution of the species is characterized by an edaphic disjunction, meaning it is found across geographically separate areas that share the same soil, in this case being restricted to basalt-derived metavolcanic soils. The speciation of C. bolensis is likely driven by this edaphic disjunction. It occurs at elevations higher than approximately 500 m (1,600 ft), where it grows in chaparral habitat.

== See also ==
- Arctostaphylos bolensis, another species of shrub endemic to the Cerro Bola
