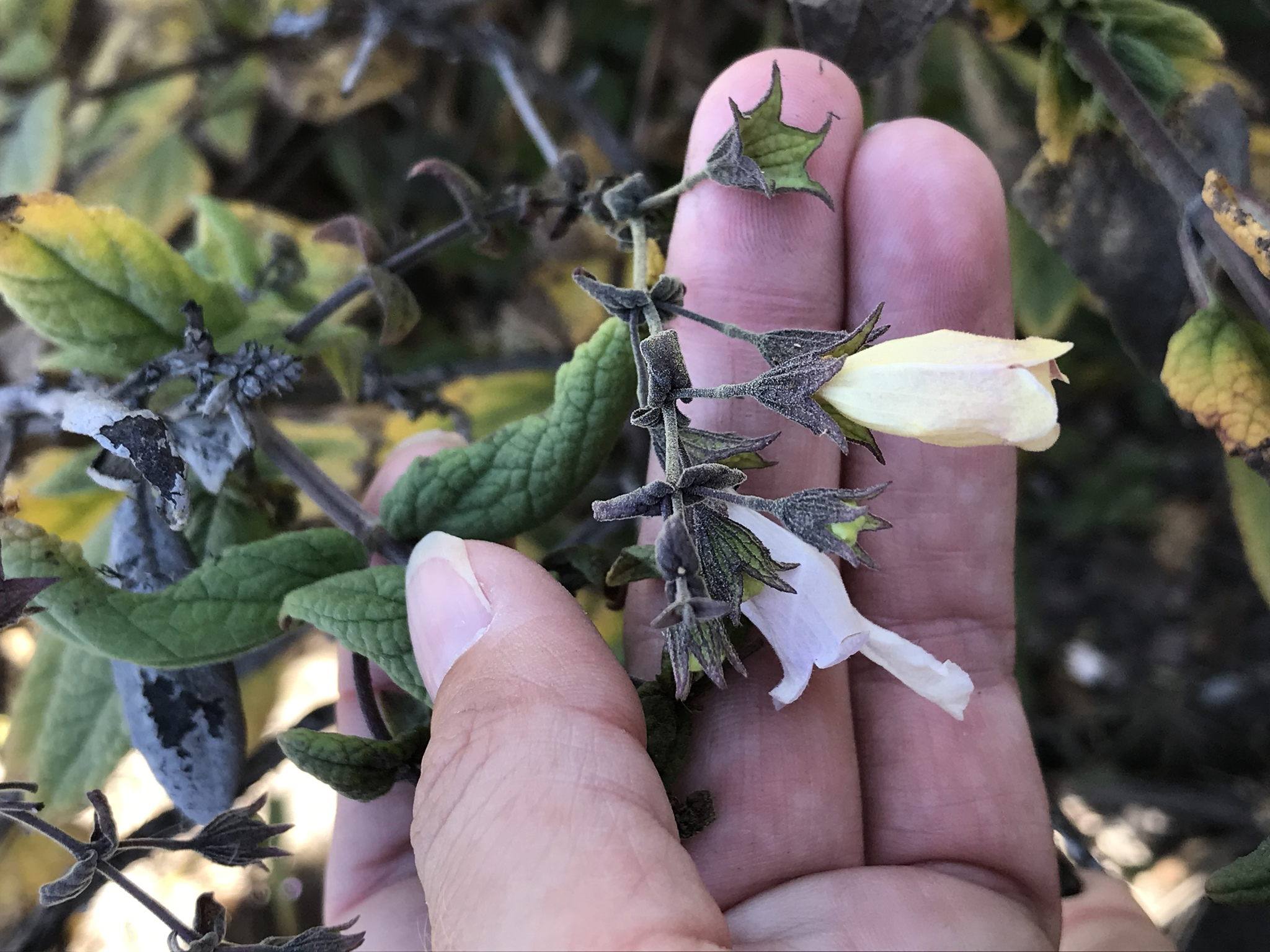

Conservation status
- Vulnerable (NatureServe)

Scientific classification
- Kingdom: Plantae
- Clade: Tracheophytes
- Clade: Angiosperms
- Clade: Eudicots
- Clade: Asterids
- Order: Lamiales
- Family: Lamiaceae
- Genus: Lepechinia
- Species: L. ganderi

Binomial name
- Lepechinia ganderi Epling

= Lepechinia ganderi =

Species of plant

Lepechinia ganderi is a rare species of perennial shrub in the mint family known by the common name San Diego pitcher sage or Gander's pitcher sage. An aromatic plant with white to lavender flowers, this species is only known from southern San Diego County in California and a small portion of Baja California, occurring on chaparral or coastal sage scrub in metavolcanic soils. Because of its limited range, it is under threat from growing urbanization and increased fire frequency.

== Description ==
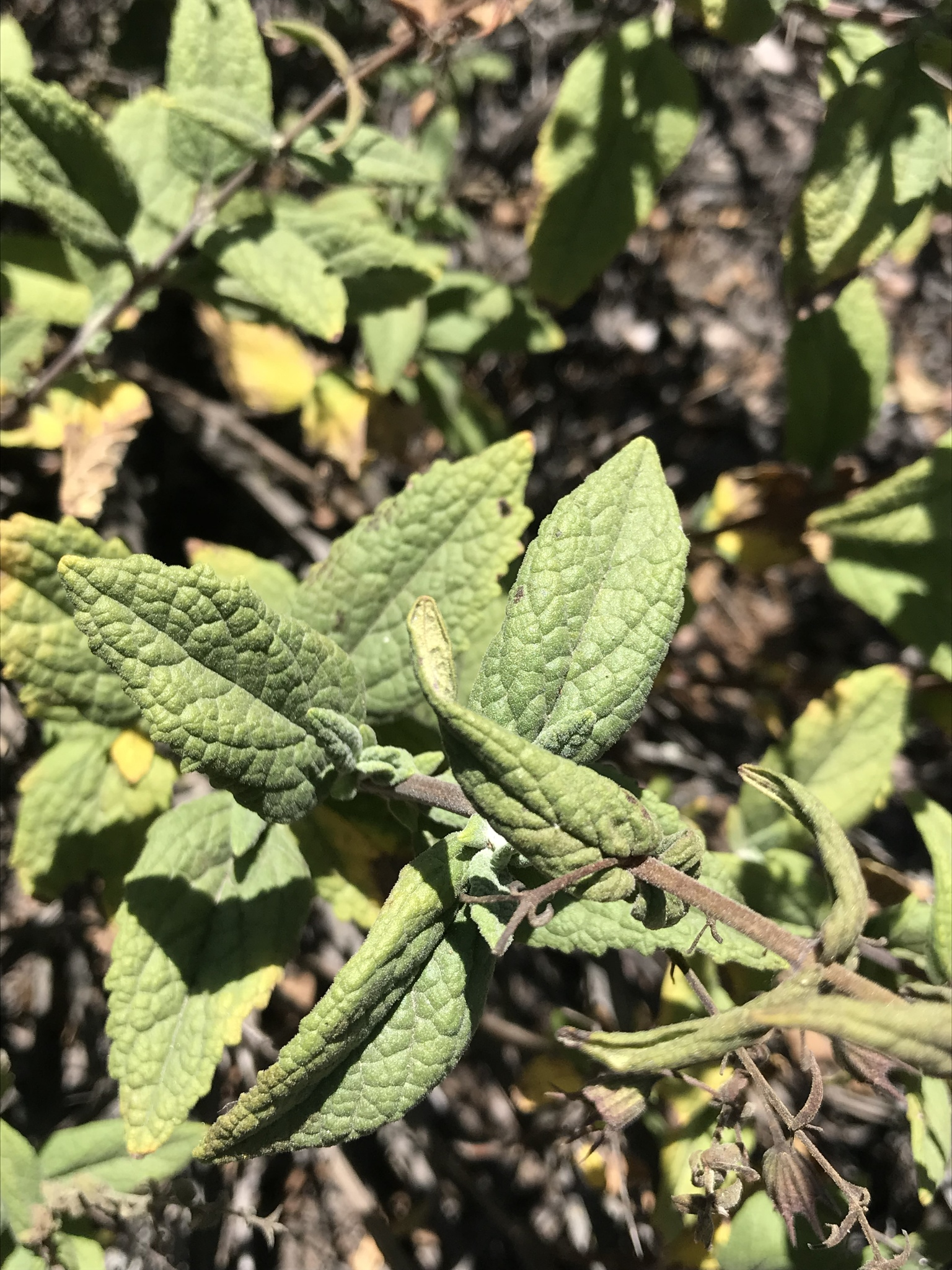
The foliage

Lepechinia ganderi is a short, aromatic shrub with slender branches coated in rough hairs and resin glands. The leaves are lance-shaped (lanceolate) and may have toothed (serrate) edges. The raceme inflorescence bears flowers on pedicels that are 1 to 2 cm long. Each flower has a base of long, pointed sepals below a white to light lavender tubular corolla. The flower is lipped at the mouth. The small, dark, hairless fruit develops attached to the sepals once the corolla falls.

The flowers are pollinated by bees and hummingbirds.

== Taxonomy ==
The type specimen of this species was collected on Otay Mountain. Plants of this species have a chromosome count of n = 16. Phylogenetic analyses place this species in a well-supported clade with Lepechinia calycinia, and within a larger clade that mostly consists of Mexican and Central American taxa.

== Distribution and habitat ==
This species is a near-endemic to southern San Diego County, California and the neighboring border region of Baja California. It is known from around 20 occurrences in the United States, many on federal land. The Mexican populations are not well studied. It is distributed throughout the coastal Peninsular Range foothills and mountains in this area, including Otay Mountain and the Jamul Mountains.

Plants of this species are typically found growing on rocky, metavolcanic, gabbroic substrates, often in habitats ranging from coastal sage scrub and chaparral to closed-cone coniferous forest, such as Tecate cypress groves, and grasslands, at elevations from 500 to 1060 meters.

== See also ==
- California chaparral and woodlands
  - California coastal sage and chaparral
  - California montane chaparral and woodlands
- Clinopodium chandleri – Another rare plant species in the mint family that occupies a similar nearby habitat
- Lepechinia cardiophylla – Similar, but with broader calyx lobes and a mildly cordate leaf base
