= Arctostaphylos bolensis =

Scientific classification
- Kingdom: Plantae
- Clade: Tracheophytes
- Clade: Angiosperms
- Clade: Eudicots
- Clade: Asterids
- Order: Ericales
- Family: Ericaceae
- Genus: Arctostaphylos
- Species: A. bolensis

Binomial name
- Arctostaphylos bolensis P.V.Wells (1992)

Species of flowering plant

Arctostaphylos bolensis is a species of perennial shrub in the heather family commonly known as the Cerro Bola manzanita. This species of manzanita is characterized by an erect habit, pendent panicles and the lack of a burl. It is a prolific bloomer, and when in blossom, it is enshrouded in white to pink urn-shaped flowers. This species is endemic to the Cerro Bola, and possibly the Cerro Italia, two mountain ranges southwest of the Valle de Las Palmas in northern Baja California.

== Description ==
This species of perennial evergreen plant grows as an erect shrub 2 to 4 m (6.6 to 13.1 ft) in height, lacking a burl at the base. The stems are hairless. The leaves are glabrous, shaped elliptic to ovate, and with a glaucous-green color. The inflorescence is a showy panicle with 4 to 8 spreading branches, with congest flowers. The bracts are leafy, and somewhat reduced, 4 to 6 mm (0.16 to 0.24 in) long. The fruit is 4 to 8 mm (0.16 to 0.31 in) large, shaped ovoid, and has a solid stone within.

== Taxonomy ==
Arctostaphylos bolensis was described by American botanist Philip Vincent Wells in a 1992 issue of the Four Seasons, a publication by the Regional Parks Botanic Garden.

=== Characteristics ===
This species is related to Arctostaphylos otayensis, which occurs to the north in the San Ysidro Mountains. This species differs from A. otayensis in having a pendent panicle and stones which are solid, with the nutlets not separable. Arctostaphylos bolensis has an overlapping range with A. glandulosa subsp. adamsii and A. glandulosa subsp. leucophylla, but is distinguished from these by the lack of a burl at the base and a taller habit.

== Distribution and habitat ==
This species is endemic to the state of Baja California in northwestern Mexico. There, it is limited to the mountains of the Cerro Bola, and possibly reported from the Cerro Italia. The Cerro Bola is a mountain range southwest of the Valle de Las Palmas, or roughly between Tecate and Ensenada. Within its small range, it is found growing in interior uplands under 400 m (1,300 ft).
