= Living Coast Discovery Center =

Zoo and public aquarium in Chula Vista, California, US

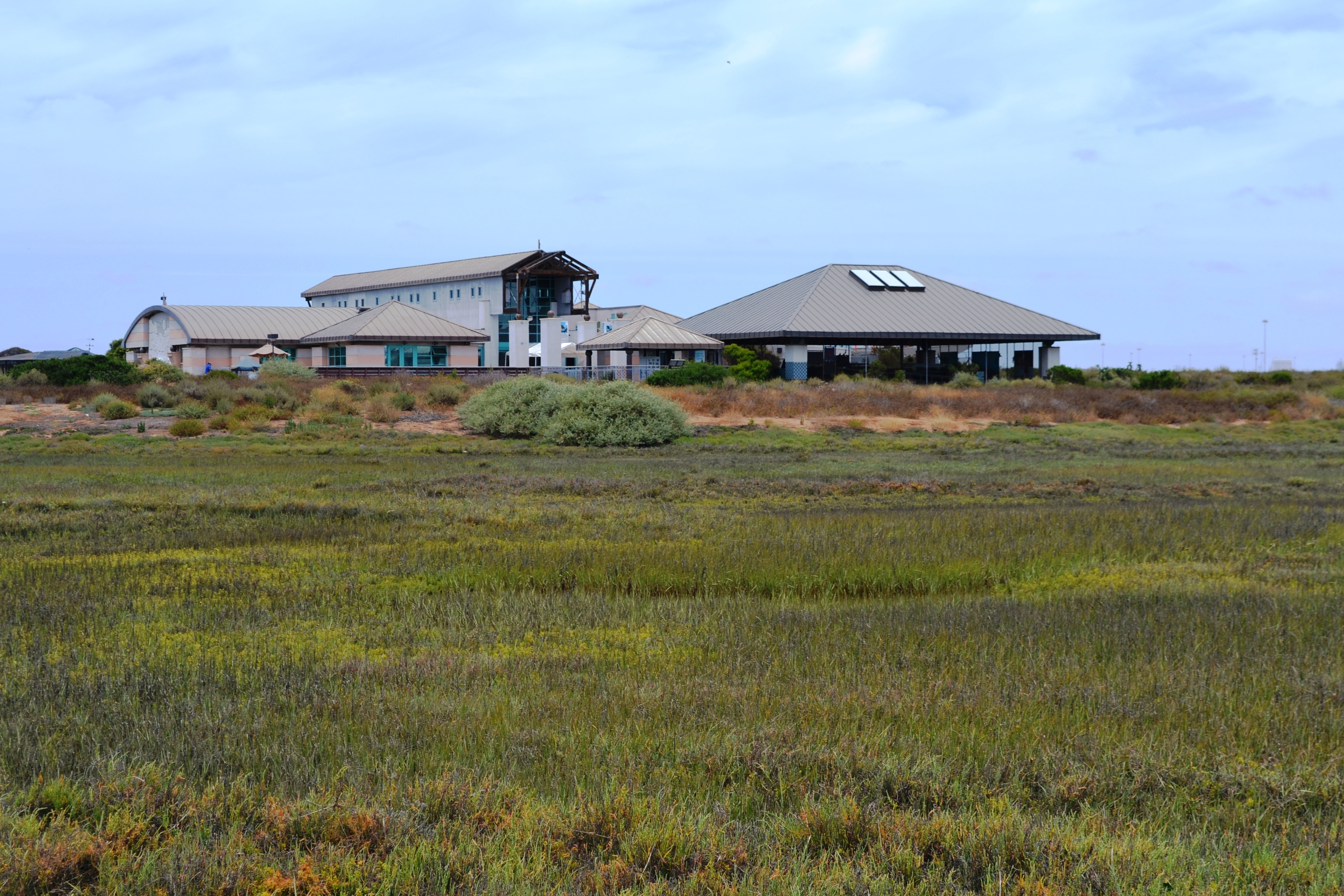
- A view of both the center and a portion of the Sweetwater Marsh.
- Interactive map of Living Coast Discovery Center
- 32.641234°N 117.110470°W
- Date opened: 1987 as the Chula Vista Nature Interpretive Center
- Location: 1000 Gunpowder Point Drive; Chula Vista, California
- Website: www.thelivingcoast.org

The Living Coast Discovery Center is a zoo and public aquarium in Chula Vista, California. An environmental education center, it is located in the Sweetwater Marsh Unit of San Diego National Wildlife Refuge. Permanent displays at the Living Coast focus on native animals and plants found in Southern California and San Diego Bay.

== History ==
The center was originally opened in 1987 as the Chula Vista Nature Interpretive Center; it was owned and operated by the City of Chula Vista. In 2010, the organization transitioned over to an independent 501(c)(3) nonprofit and its current name.

== Exhibits ==
The site consists of several large exhibit spaces:

- Turtle Lagoon – Green sea turtles
- Discovery Center Galleria – includes seahorses, jellyfish, eels, sharks, lobsters, crabs, octopus, garibaldi damselfish, sea stars, snakes, lizards
- Shark & Ray Experience & Sting Ray Touch pool – Leopard sharks, grey smooth-hound sharks, horn sharks, swell shark, shovelnose guitarfish, bat rays, round rays, diamond rays, crabs, fish, and loggerhead sea turtle
- Burrowing Owl Courtyard
- Shorebird Aviary – light-footed Ridgway's rail, black-crowned night heron, black oystercatcher, red-breasted merganser, hooded merganser, and more
- Raptor Row – red-tailed hawk, red-shouldered hawk, Cooper’s hawk, peregrine falcon, turkey vulture, barn owl, great horned owl, burrowing owl, American kestrel
- Eagle Mesa – golden eagle, bald eagle
- Native plant gardens and composting demonstration garden

There are 1.5 miles of trails from the center of San Diego National Wildlife Refuge out to the shore of San Diego Bay.

In addition to general public exhibits, the center hosts over 15,000 school children at their facility each year for educational field trips that focus on science and environmental programs.

== Gallery ==
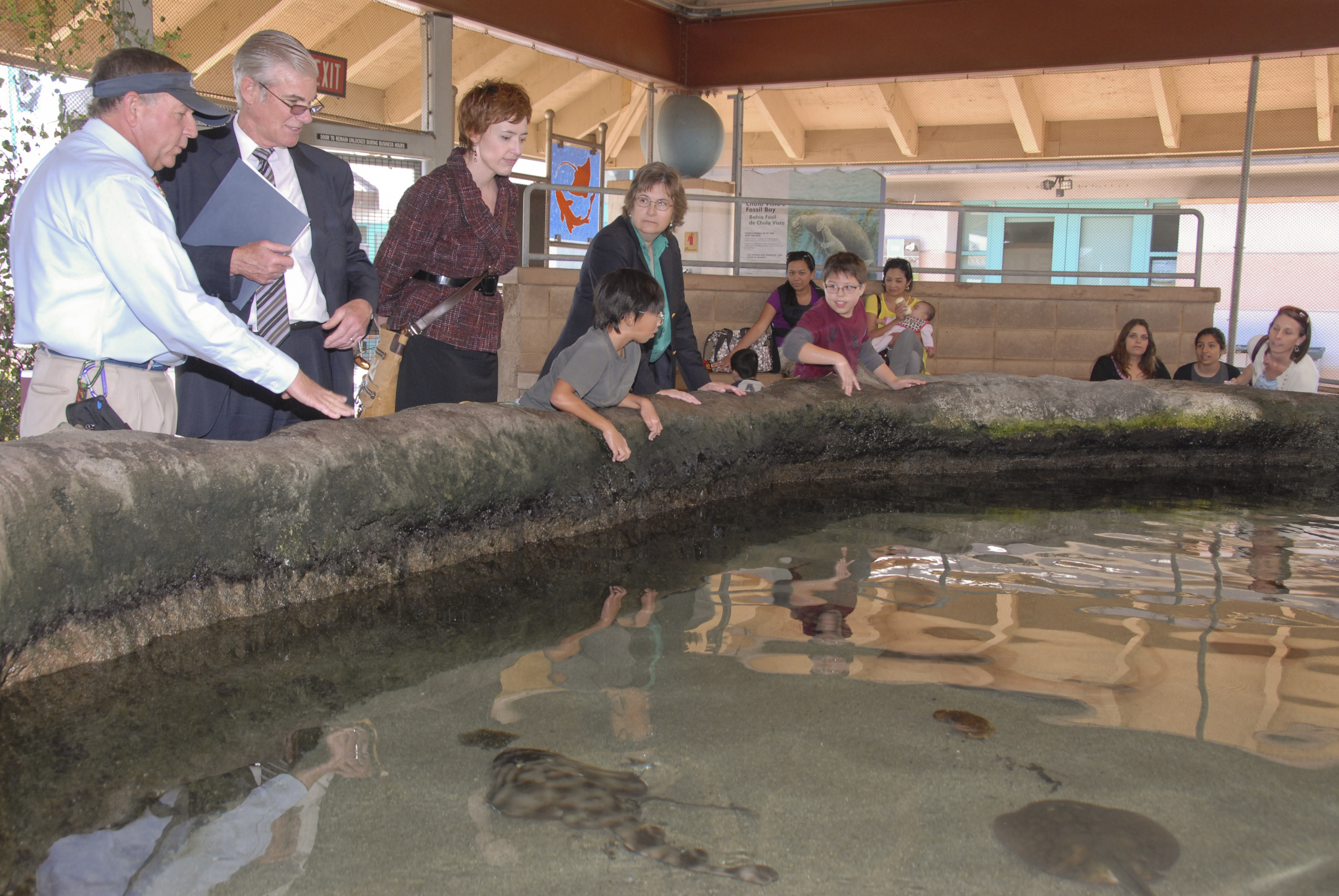
Touch pool

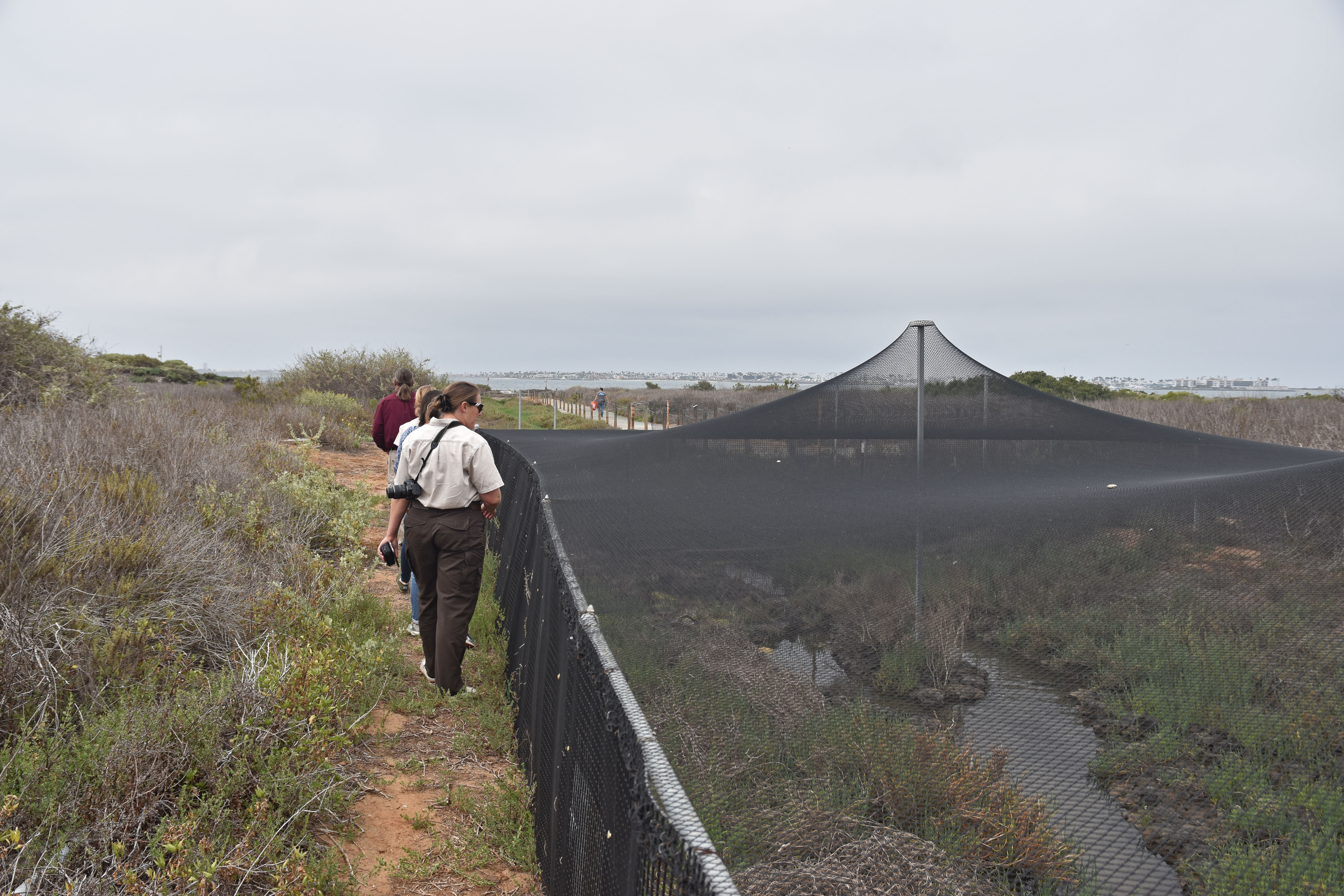
Temporary enclosure for the ridgway chicks before being released back into the wild
