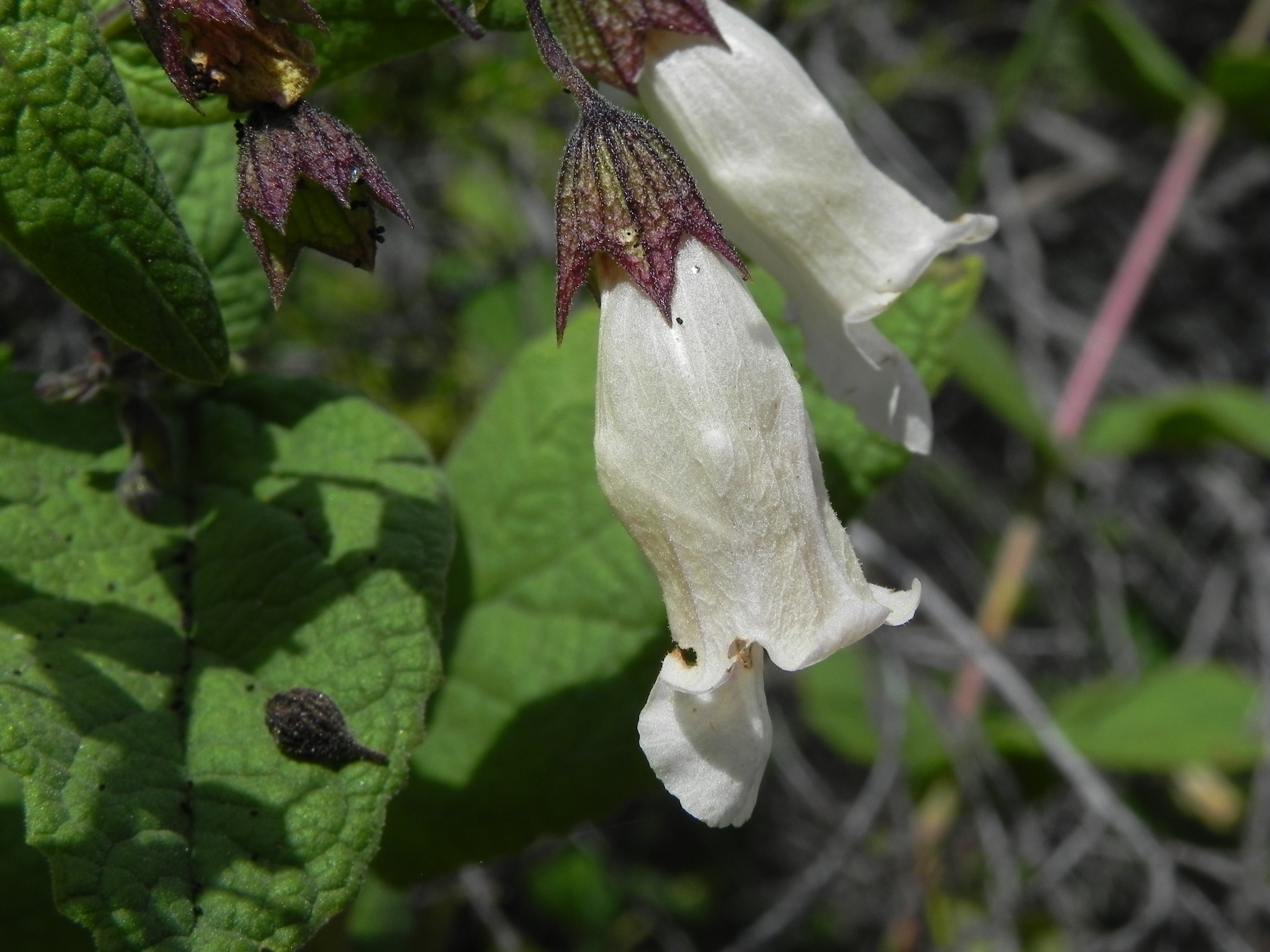

Conservation status
- Imperiled (NatureServe)

Scientific classification
- Kingdom: Plantae
- Clade: Tracheophytes
- Clade: Angiosperms
- Clade: Eudicots
- Clade: Asterids
- Order: Lamiales
- Family: Lamiaceae
- Genus: Lepechinia
- Species: L. cardiophylla

Binomial name
- Lepechinia cardiophylla Epling

= Lepechinia cardiophylla =

Species of plant

Lepechinia cardiophylla is an uncommon species of flowering plant in the mint family known by the common names Santa Ana pitcher sage and heart-leaved pitcher sage. A broad-leaved fragrant shrub, it has distinct pitcher-shaped flowers. It is native to the Peninsular Ranges and found in the Santa Ana Mountains of Southern California, a few locations in San Diego County, and some of the coastal mountains of northern Baja California. Few populations of the plant are known and many of them are located in areas that are threatened by development and other human activity.

== Description ==
Lepechinia cardiophylla is an aromatic shrub with branching stems covered in resin glands. The hairy, glandular leaves are heart-shaped to oval-shaped and often toothed along the edges.

The raceme inflorescence bears flowers on prominent pedicels. Each flower is a cuplike calyx of glandular sepals around a tubular white to lavender corolla. The corolla is curled back at the mouth into small lips.

The fruit is a dark colored, hairless body a few millimeters long which develops within the calyx of sepals.

== Taxonomy ==
This species was first described by Carl Epling in 1948. It is characterized by its strongly cordate leaves that are broadly ovate in outline. It can be distinguished by the shape and size of the leaves from Lepechinia calycina and from Lepechinia fragrans by the texture and shape of the calyx.

== Distribution and habitat ==
Lepechinia cardiophylla was first described from the chaparral of the Santa Ana Mountains of Orange County, California, where it is mostly concentrated. A disjunct population is located in San Diego County, around Iron Mountain in Poway, occupying the intermediate gap between the larger populations in the Santa Anas and the ones in Baja California. In southern San Diego County, the species is instead replaced by the distinct Lepechinia ganderi. In Baja California, this species is found abundantly on the Cerro Bola, and is distributed south to the coastal mountains of Ensenada to Ejido Eréndira. Its distribution is possibly relictual.

This species is primarily found growing in chaparral and cismontane woodland. In Orange County it is associated with Exchequer soils, while in San Diego County, Iron Mountain has primarily Friant rocky fine sandy loams. The populations in Baja California, such as on the Cerro Bola, are found on volcanic derived soils.

== See also ==
- Lepechinia ganderi – A similar species which differs in its narrower calyx lobes and non-cordate leaf base.
