= San Ysidro Mountains =

Mountain range in southern San Diego County, California

- Otay Mountains
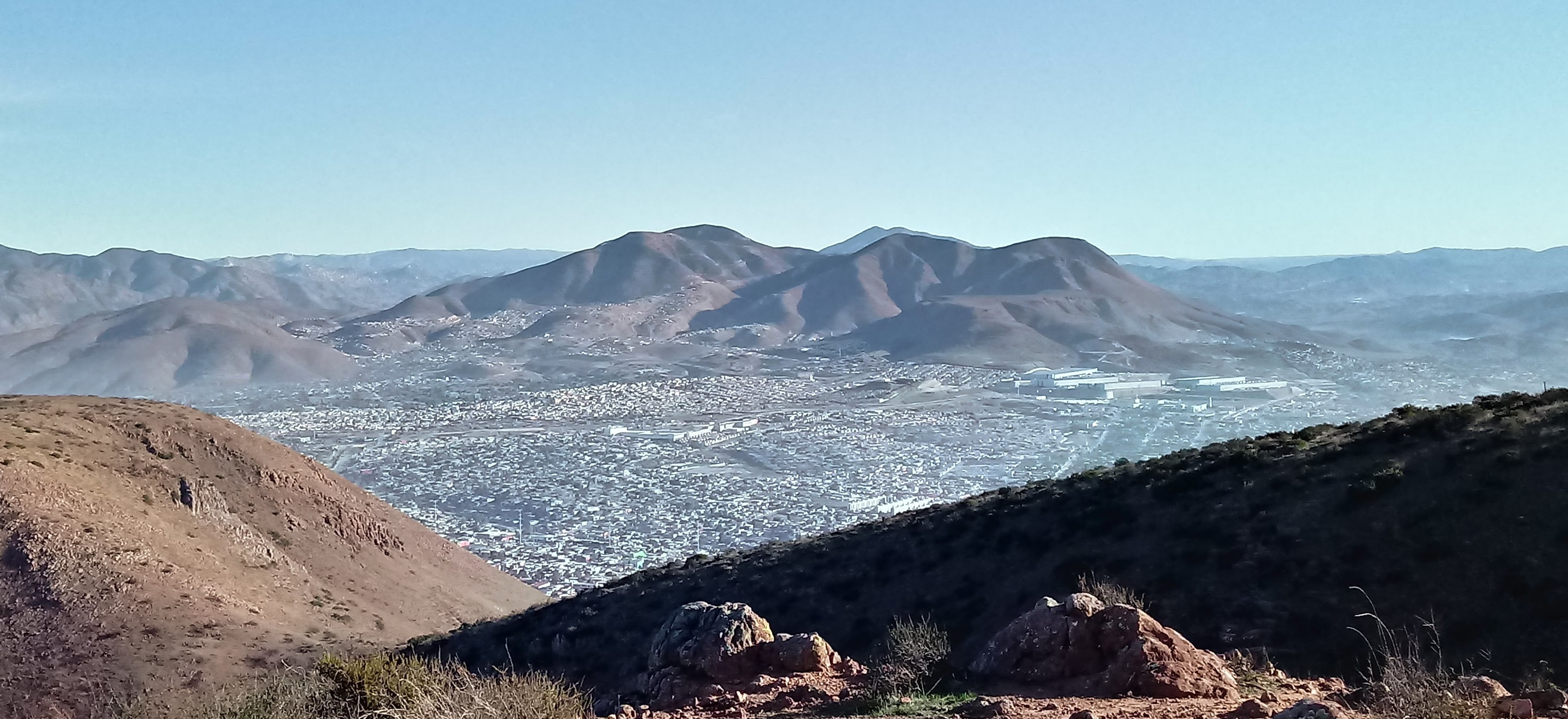
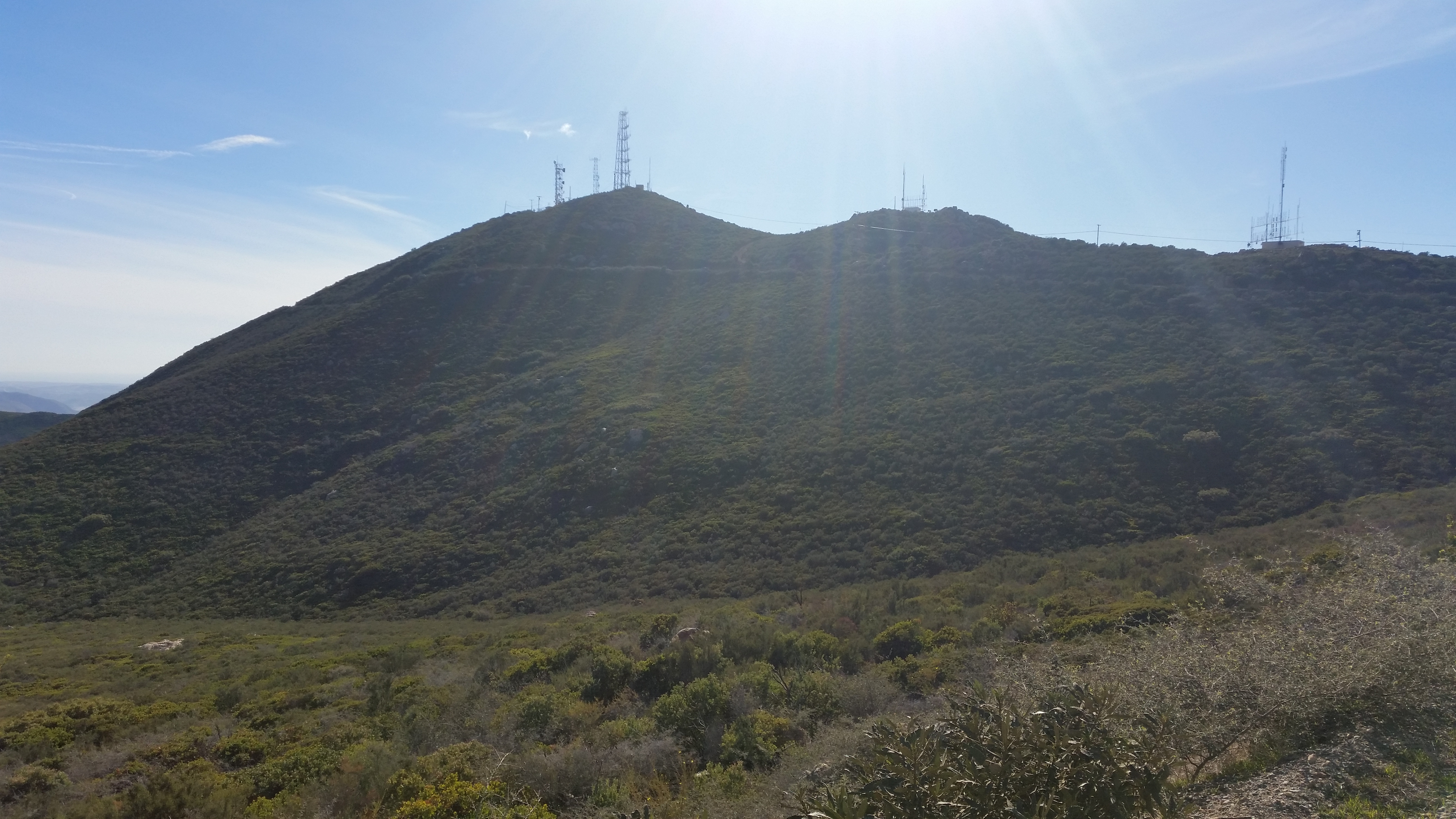
- The Cerro San Isidro (top) and Otay Mountain (bottom)

Highest point
- Elevation: 3,568 ft (1,088 m) NAVD 88

Geography
- Location within California
- Countries: United States and Mexico
- States: California and Baja California
- Districts: San Diego County and Tijuana Municipality
- Range coordinates: 32°35′48.212″N 116°49′24.075″W
- Parent range: Peninsular Ranges
- Topo map: USGS Otay Mountain
- Biome: California chaparral and woodlands

The San Ysidro Mountains are a mountain range in southern San Diego County, California, and Baja California, Mexico. The mountains are a rugged coastal foothill range of the Peninsular Ranges system. Major peaks include the highest summit of the range, Otay Mountain, and the Cerro San Isidro which forms the southern extrusion of the range on the Mexican side of the border. The majority of the range is within the Otay Mountain Wilderness area, in the United States.

== Geography ==
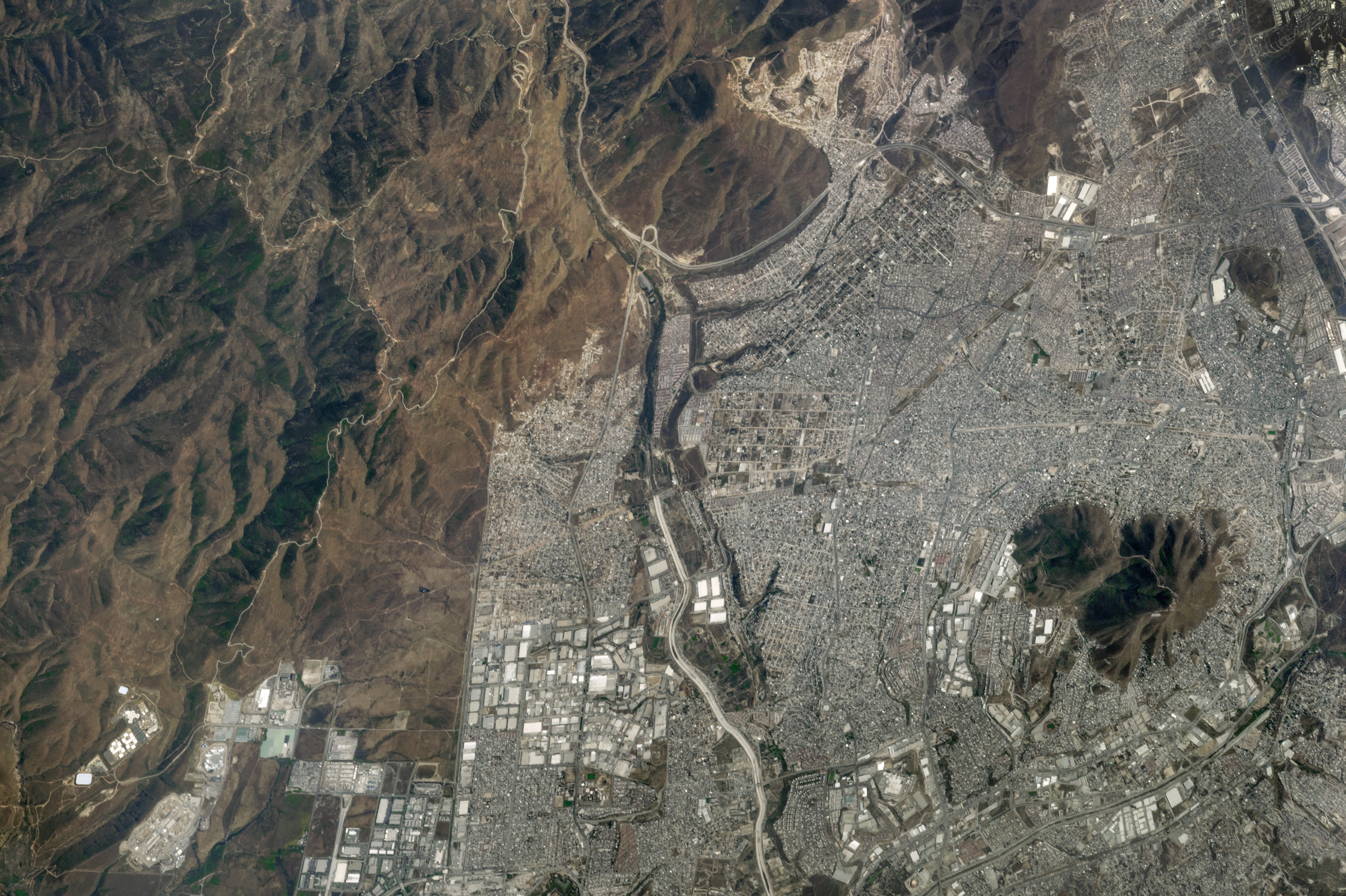
The San Ysidro Mountains are towards the top of this image. On the upper center of the image, the neighborhood of Valle Imperial can be seen reaching into the Cerro San Isidro.

Lying only 13 to 21 miles (21 to 34 km) inland from the Pacific Ocean, this mountain range rises out of the coastal plain of San Diego and Tijuana until it reaches a maximum height of 3,568 feet (1,088 m) on the summit of Otay Mountain. On the western side of the mountain lies Lower Otay Lake and Otay Mesa, with Richard J. Donovan Correctional Facility and other detention centers and law enforcement properties lying on the southwest slope of the mountain. On the eastern flank, Mine Canyon and Marron Valley separate the San Ysidro Mountains from Tecate Peak (Kuuchamaa).

=== Cerro San Isidro ===
The Cerro San Isidro, located in Tijuana, is separated from the rest of the range by the border fence and the Rio Alamar, and forms the southern portion of the mountains. The summit of the Cerro San Isidro reaches approximately 2,750 feet (840 m), and supports many of the same endemic and rare plants found on Otay Mountain. A colonia of Tijuana, Valle Imperial, stretches across the western slope of the mountain.

On December 31, 2014, a rare snowfall event blanketed the Cerro San Isidro after low temperatures of 4 °C (39 °F).

== Ecology ==
The native vegetation of the San Ysidro Mountains represents the coastal sage scrub of the California coastal sage and chaparral ecoregion (western faces); and plants of the California montane chaparral and woodlands ecoregion (inland). The San Ysidro Mountains are one of the few locations the rare Tecate cypress (Cupressus forbesii) is found. This tree was once abundant in the higher elevations of the range as well as in its canyons. The San Ysidro Mountains were deforested of living foliage by wildfires in 2003 and 2007. Cupressus forbesii is a fire ecology dependent species, and there has been some evidence of regrowth starting.

== See also ==
- California chaparral and woodlands — Terrestrial Biome
- Chaparral
