= San Diego National Wildlife Refuge =

National Wildlife Refuge in California

Coordinates: 32°36′9″N 117°6′53″W

- IUCN category IV (habitat/species management area)
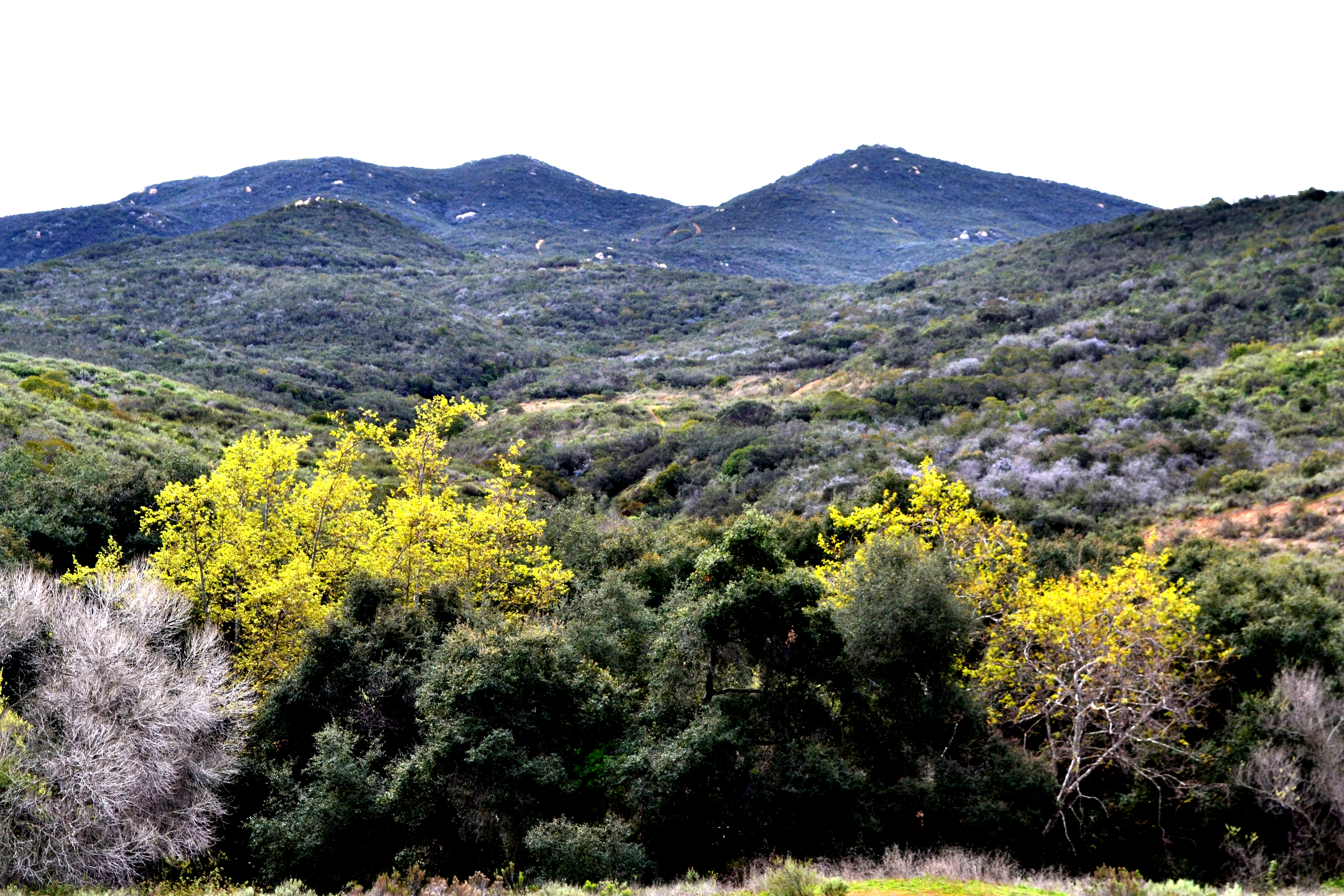
- Location: San Diego County, California, United States
- Nearest city: San Diego, California
- Governing body: U.S. Fish and Wildlife Service
- Website: San Diego National Wildlife Refuge

San Diego National Wildlife Refuge is a National Wildlife Refuge in California. It is part of the San Diego National Wildlife Refuge Complex. A variety of habitats from coastal sage scrub and chaparral to oak woodland and freshwater marsh describe this inland refuge in San Diego's backcountry.

The Living Coast Discovery Center is located in the Sweetwater Marsh Unit adjacent to the administrative headquarters for the US Fish and Wildlife Service. The center features exhibits of marine life, birds and plants found at San Diego Bay, and partners with the refuge to offer environmental education programs. There are 1.5 miles of trails with access to the bay.

The Otay-Sweetwater Unit of the San Diego National Wildlife Refuge is part of the National Wildlife Refuge System's contribution to the Multiple Species Conservation Plan, a program designed to conserve enough open space and habitat for species survival while enabling orderly development to occur where necessary. It is closed to the public.

San Diego National Wildlife Refuge's abundance of coastal sage and chaparral are an important addition to other inland preserves established to conserve and restore fast diminishing habitat. This inland refuge is home to such endangered birds as least Bell's vireo, California gnatcatcher, a rare butterfly, the Quino checkerspot and to the San Diego horned lizard. Biological surveys for other species are ongoing as new land is acquired. The approved refuge boundary is 44,000 acres (180 km^{2}), with 8,000 acres (32 km^{2}) for the Vernal Pools Unit.
