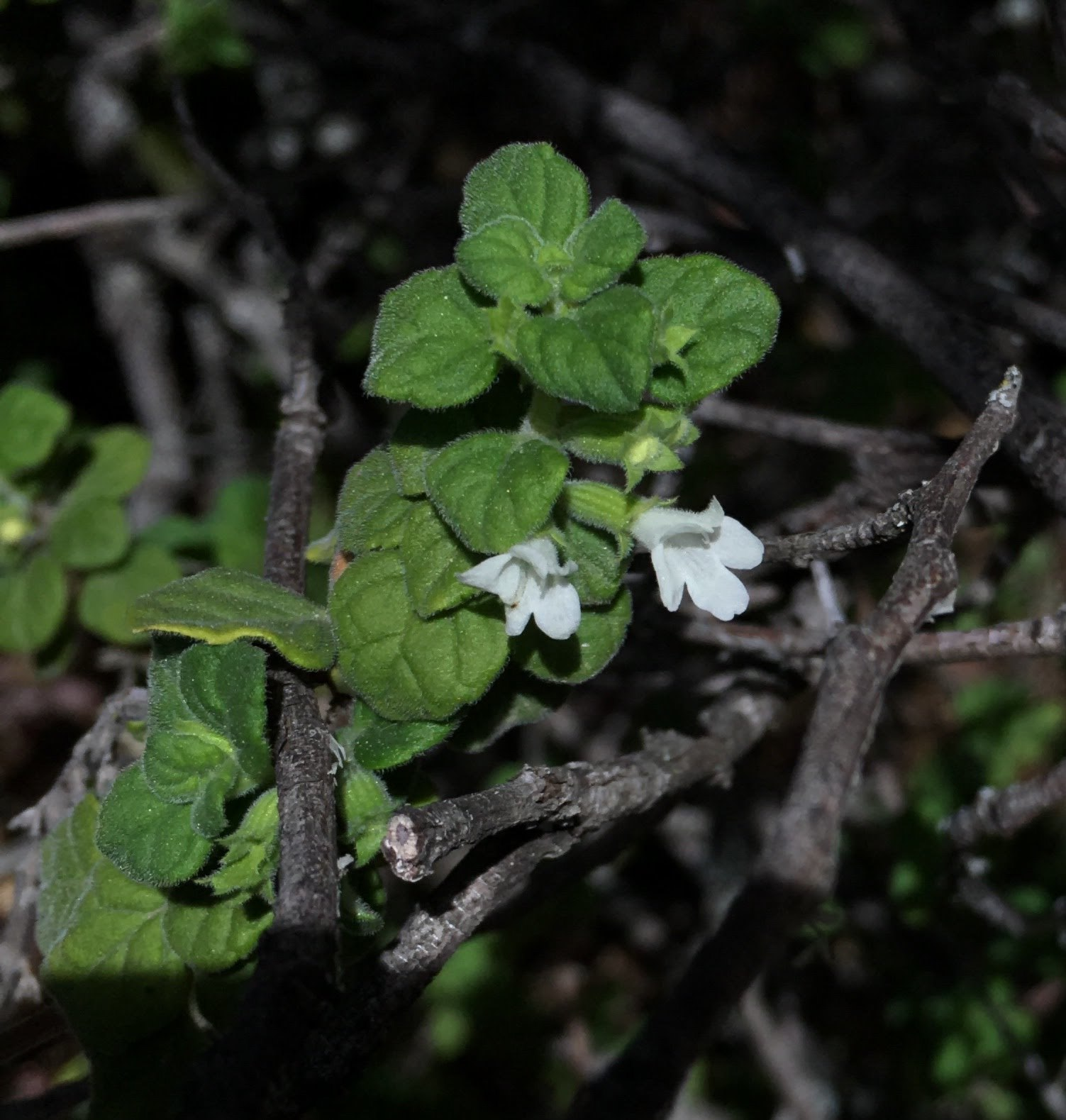

Conservation status
- Imperiled (NatureServe)

Scientific classification
- Kingdom: Plantae
- Clade: Tracheophytes
- Clade: Angiosperms
- Clade: Eudicots
- Clade: Asterids
- Order: Lamiales
- Family: Lamiaceae
- Genus: Clinopodium
- Species: C. chandleri

Binomial name
- Clinopodium chandleri (Brandegee) Cantino & S.J. Wagstaff

Synonyms
- Calamintha chandleri Brandegee; Satureja chandleri (Brandegee) Druce

= Clinopodium chandleri =

Species of flowering plant

Clinopodium chandleri is an uncommon species of flowering plant in the mint family known by the common name San Miguel savory. It is native to northern Baja California and several areas of southern California, where it can be found in mountain chaparral. A fragrant plant with white flowers, it is one of southern California's rarest shrubs.

== Description ==
It is a small shrub with slender branches up to half a meter long from a woody stem base. The toothed or wavy-edged leaves are up to 1.5 centimeters long and wide, the hairy blades borne on short petioles. The herbage is glandular and aromatic. Flowers occur in the leaf axils. Each is bell-shaped with a tubular throat, the corolla white to lavender and under a centimeter long.

== Distribution and habitat ==
This species is distributed from southern California in the United States to northwestern Baja California in Mexico. It is found throughout rocky slopes and chaparral in the Peninsular Ranges, from the Santa Anas south to Ensenada. It only occurs on specialized soils, like metavolcanic substrate. Where it overlaps with Clinopodium ganderi, northeast of Ensenada, it forms a hybrid species.

This species is threatened by residential development, foot traffic (particularly from trampling near trails), agriculture, and recreational activities.

== Gallery ==
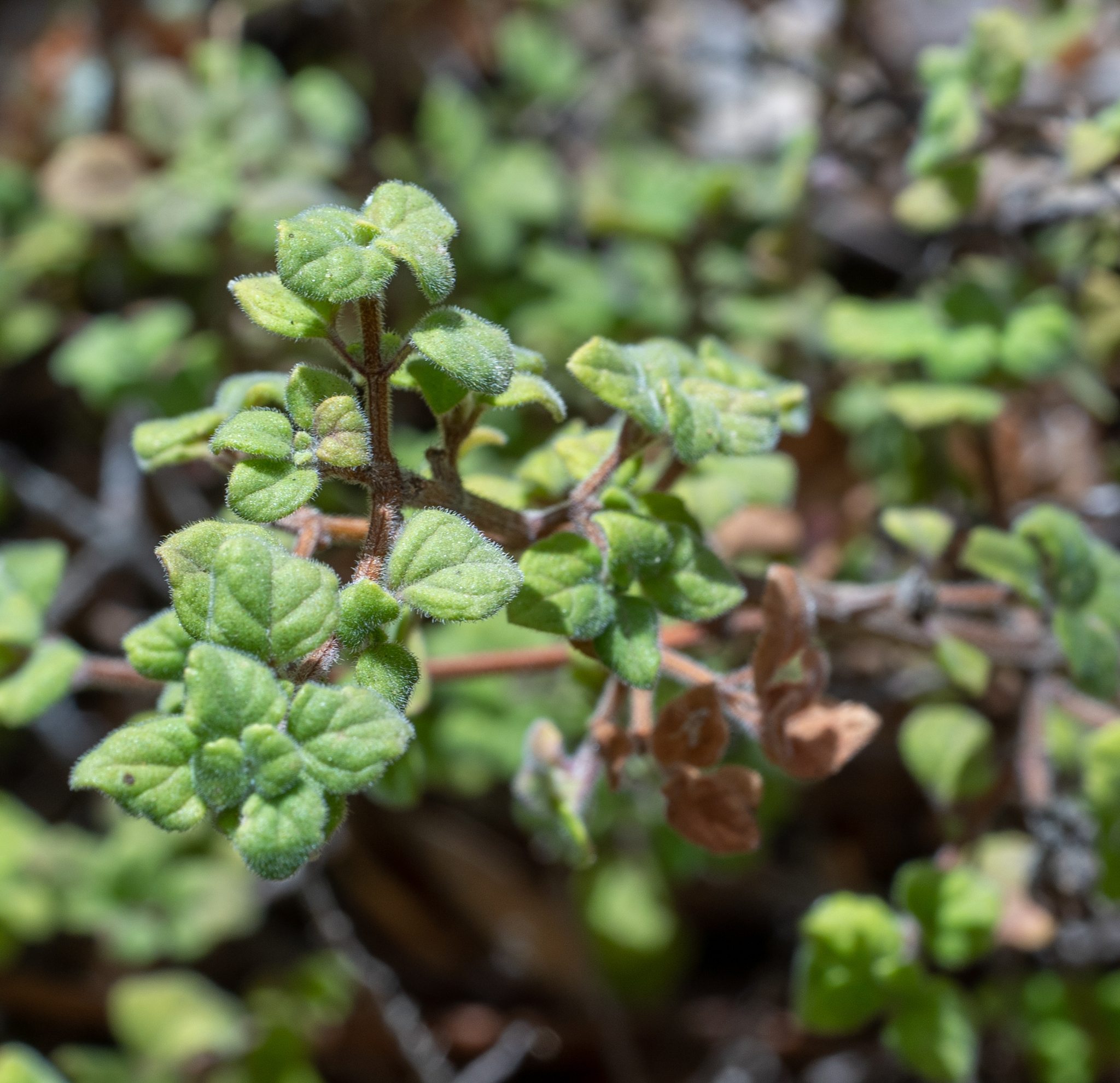
Detail of the herbage

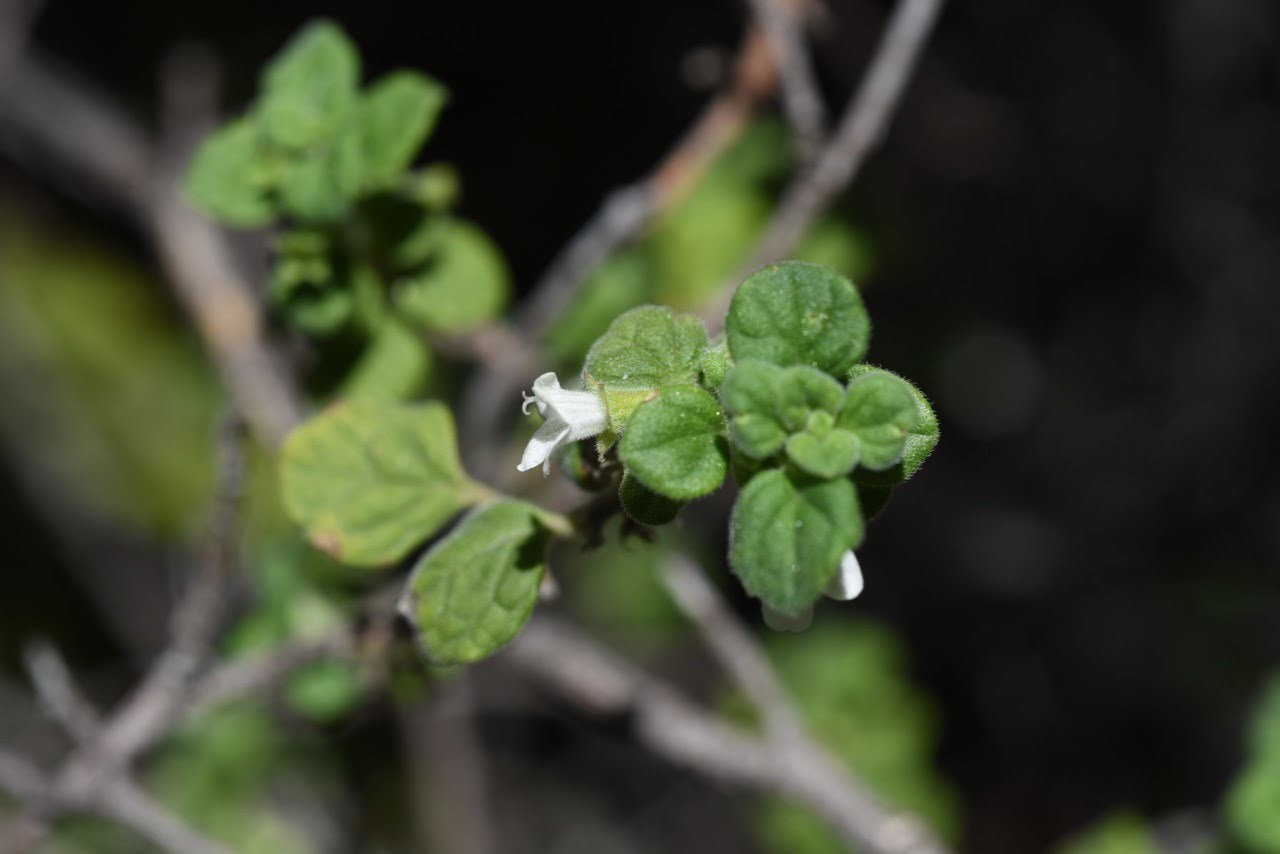
Blooming

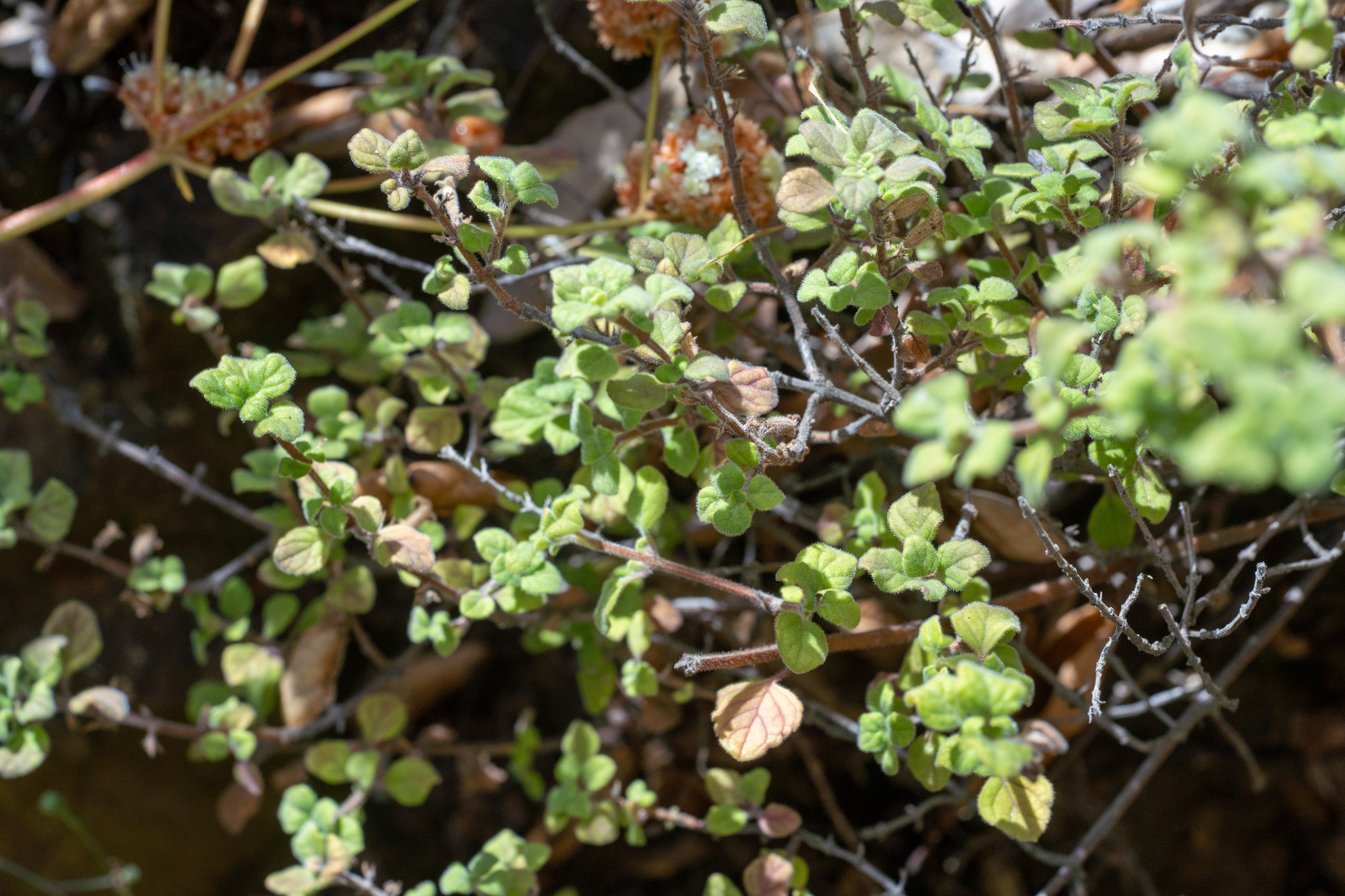
In habitat

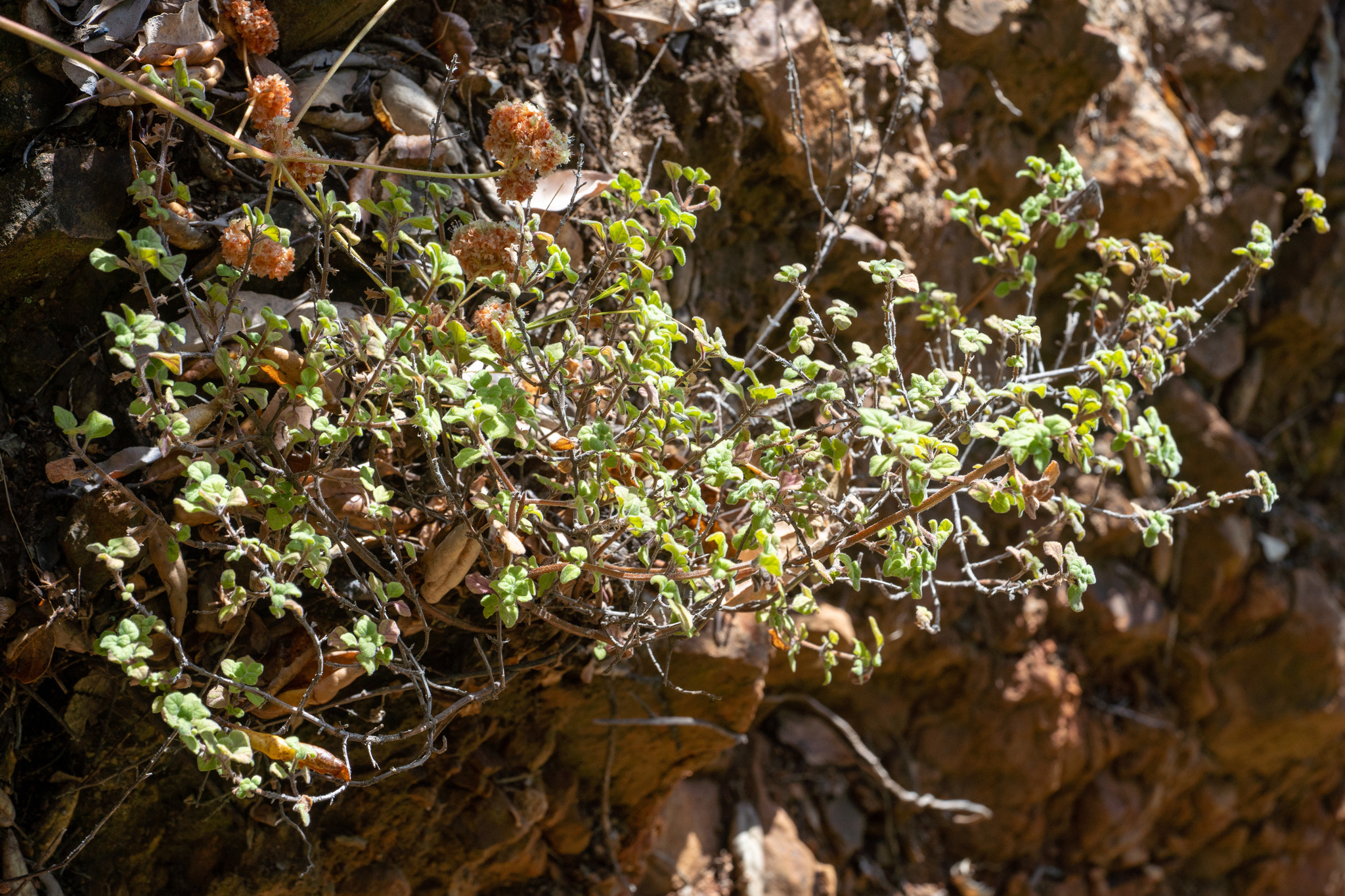
In habitat
