= Tecate Peak =

Mountain in California, United States

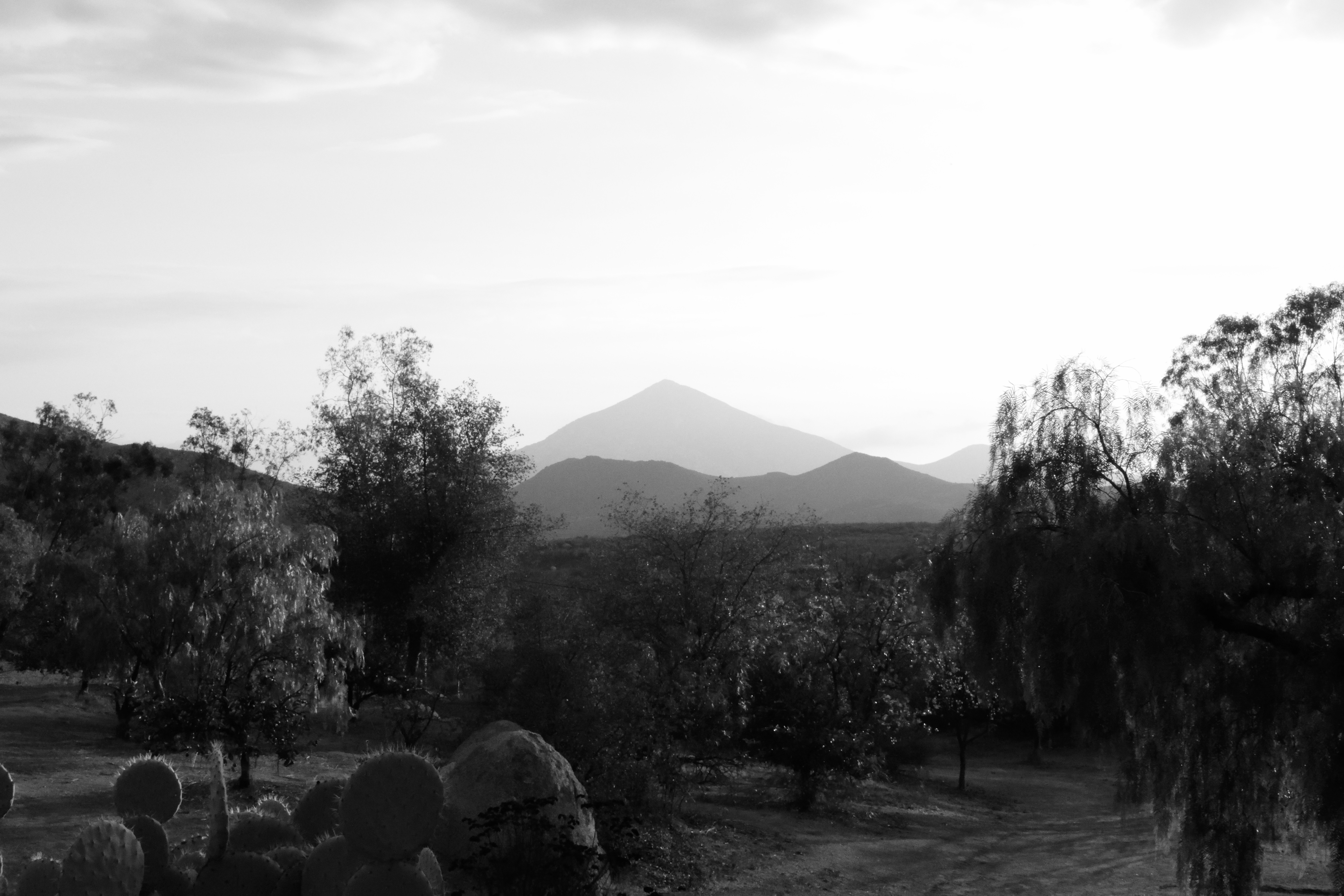

Highest point
- Elevation: 3,883 ft (1,184 m) NAVD 88
- Prominence: 1,885 ft (575 m)
- Listing: San Diego Peak list
- Coordinates: 32°34′46″N 116°41′20″W

Geography
- Location within San Diego County, California
- Location: San Diego County, California, U.S.
- Topo map: USGS Tecate

Climbing
- Easiest route: Road (high clearance recommended)

Tecate Peak is a mountain in San Diego County, California. It is 4 miles (6.4 km) west of the twin towns of Tecate, California, and Tecate, Baja California, and it is about 1/2 mile (800 m) north of the Mexico–United States border.

Tecate Peak is also known as Kuuchamaa (also spelled Kuchamaa, Cuchuma, and Cuchama) Mountain. It is a sacred mountain for the indigenous Kumeyaay people. It is currently being altered by the US government to expand the border wall despite protests from Kumeeyays and Mexicans.
