= San Miguel Mountain =

Mountain in California, United States

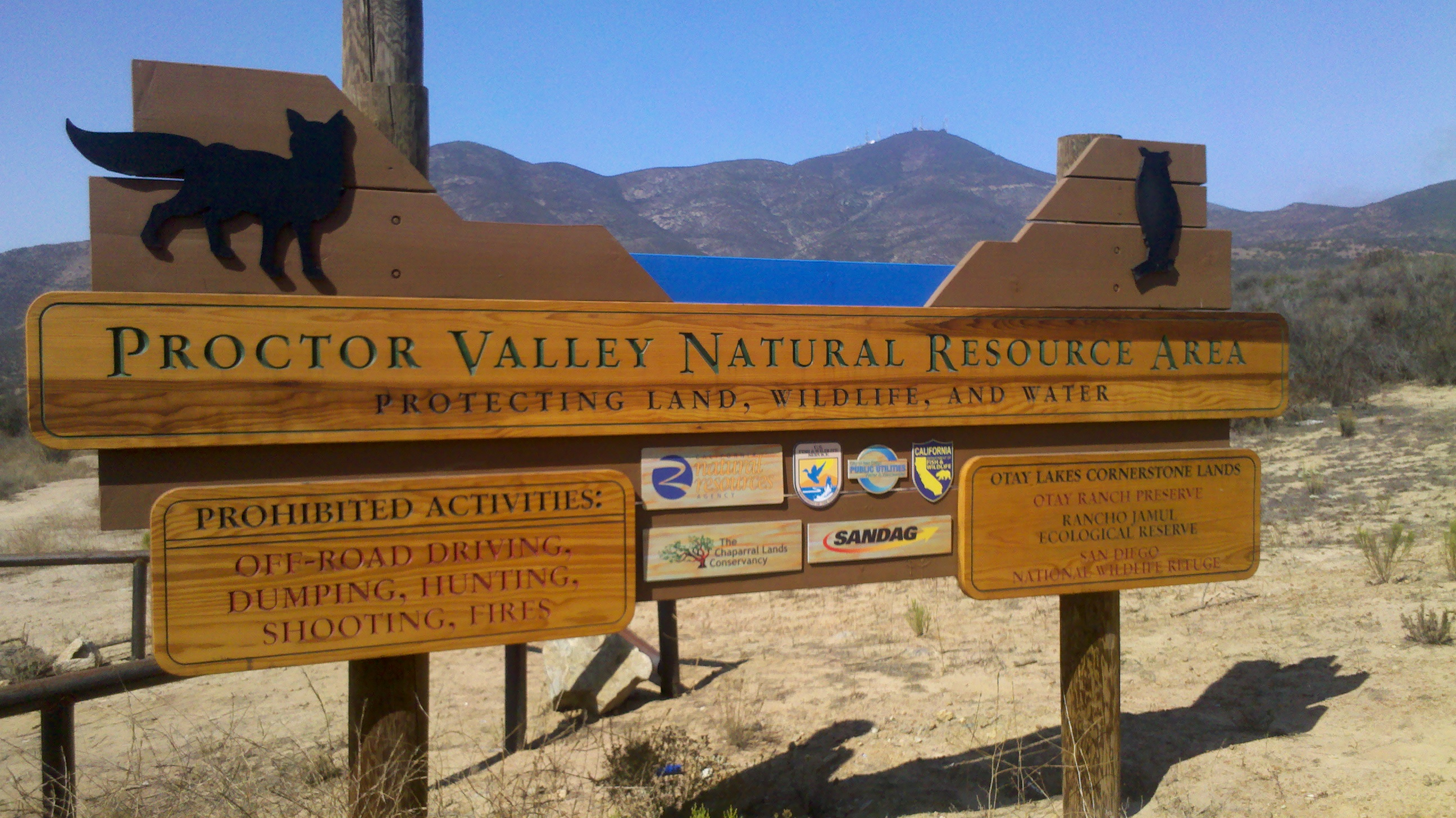
- Proctor Valley signpost with San Miguel Mountain in the background

Highest point
- Elevation: 2,569 ft (783 m) NAVD 88
- Prominence: 1,545 ft (471 m)
- Isolation: 7.29 mi (11.73 km)
- Coordinates: 32°41′47″N 116°56′11″W

Geography
- Location within San Diego County, California Location within southern California
- Location: San Diego County, California, U.S.
- Topo map: USGS Jamul Mountains

San Miguel Mountain is a mountain in Chula Vista, California. It is 2,567' high, and is the 84th highest peak in San Diego County.

Because San Miguel is "the highest point close in to the San Diego metro area", it has been home to radio and TV transmitters since the 1960s.
