= Otay Mountain =

Mountain in California, United States

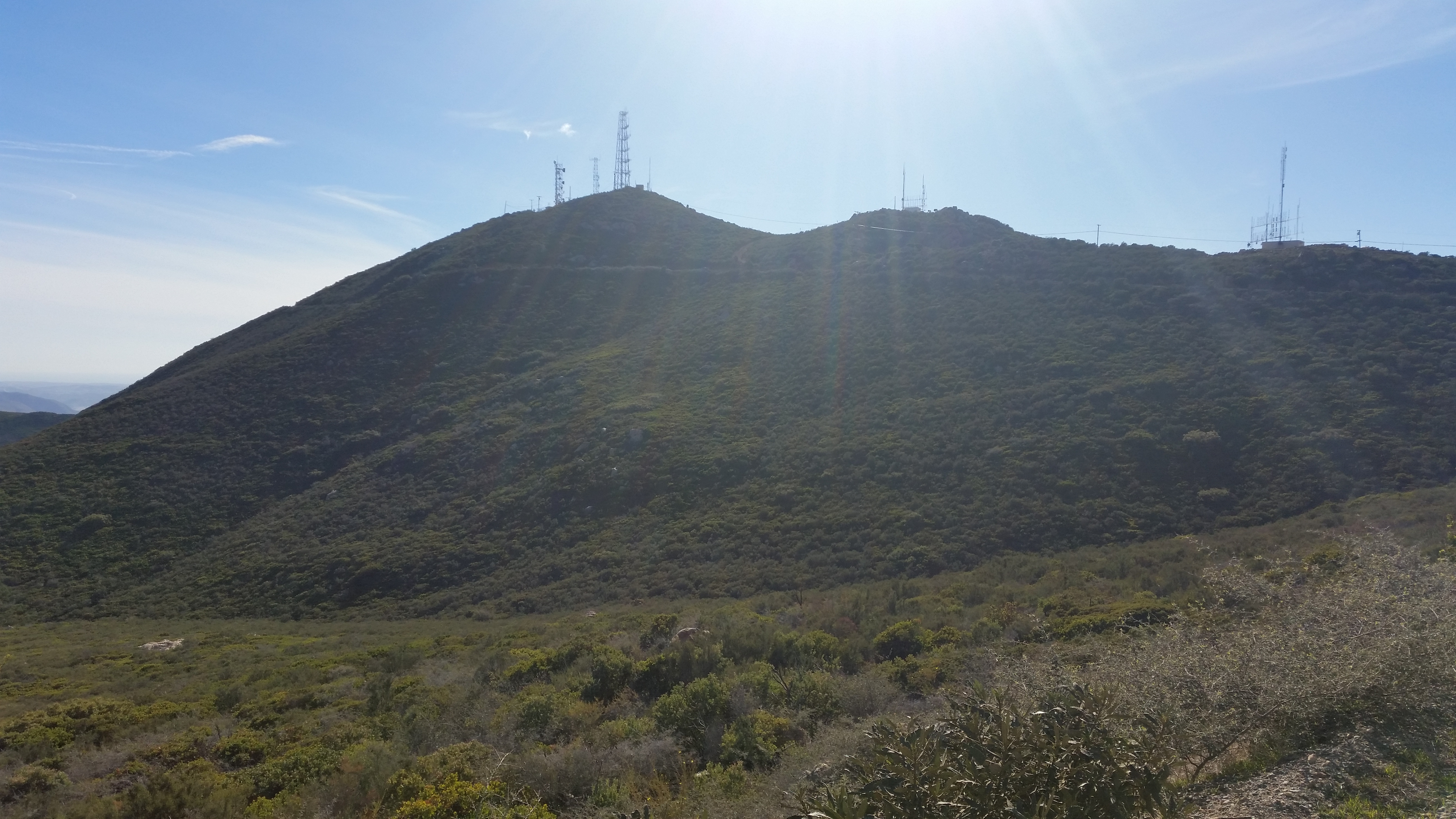
- Otay Mountain as seen from Doghouse Junction

Highest point
- Elevation: 3,568 ft (1,088 m) NAVD 88 NAVD 88
- Prominence: 2,086 ft (636 m)
- Coordinates: 32°35′40″N 116°50′41″W

Geography
- Location within San Diego County, California Location within California
- Location: San Diego County, California
- Parent range: San Ysidro Mountains
- Topo map: USGS Otay Mountain

Climbing
- Easiest route: Trail hike (Class 1)

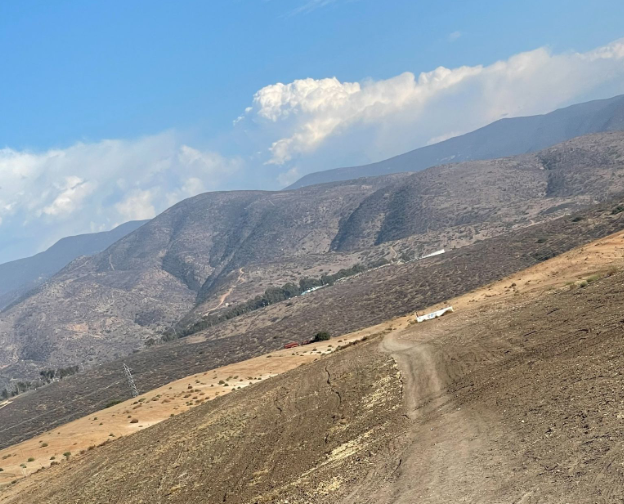
Otay Mountain from the North

Otay Mountain is a mountain in San Diego County, California. It is the highest summit of the San Ysidro Mountains. The mountain is located in the Otay Mountain Wilderness area.

The Mexico-United States border runs along the south face of the mountain.

== History ==
The name "Otay" comes from the Kumeyaay word Otai (other variations include Ohatay, Otay, Otaÿ, Mataotay, and Mata Ota) which means "it is big" or "the big place".

On March 16, 1991, a Hawker Siddeley HS-125 airplane carrying seven members of singer Reba McEntire's band, plus her business manager and two pilots, crashed into the side of the mountain after taking off from nearby Brown Field Municipal Airport, killing all ten on board.

Otay Mountain has had several wildfire incidents in the past. The plant life in Otay Mountain "burned completely" in 2003, and another wildfire happened later in 2007.

A border fence spanning the Mexico–United States border runs along the south face of Otay mountain in order to prevent illegal immigrants from crossing the national border. The border fence has received criticism for its effects on nature and wilderness. In particular, the construction was criticized by author Rob Davis for creating a harsh environment for a species of butterfly due to dust being kicked up by trucks. The fence in the area is estimated to cost approximately $16 million per mile.

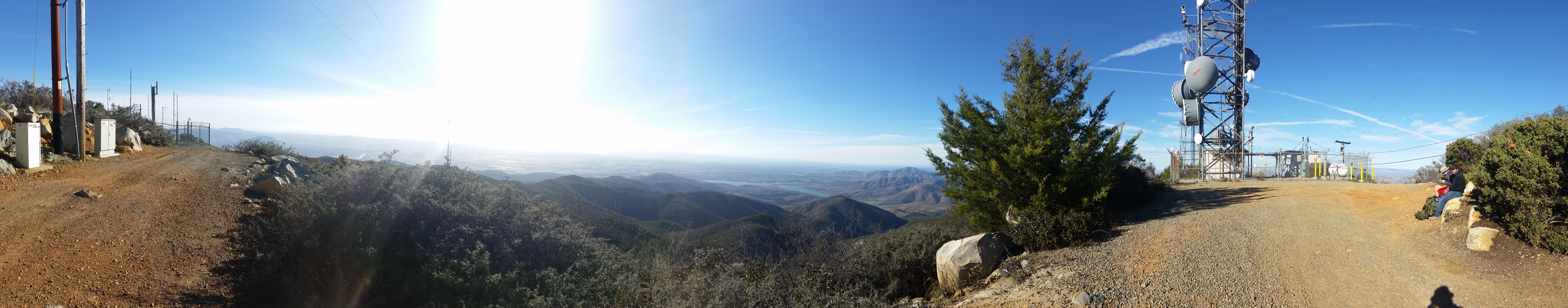
Panoramic view atop Otay Mountain.
