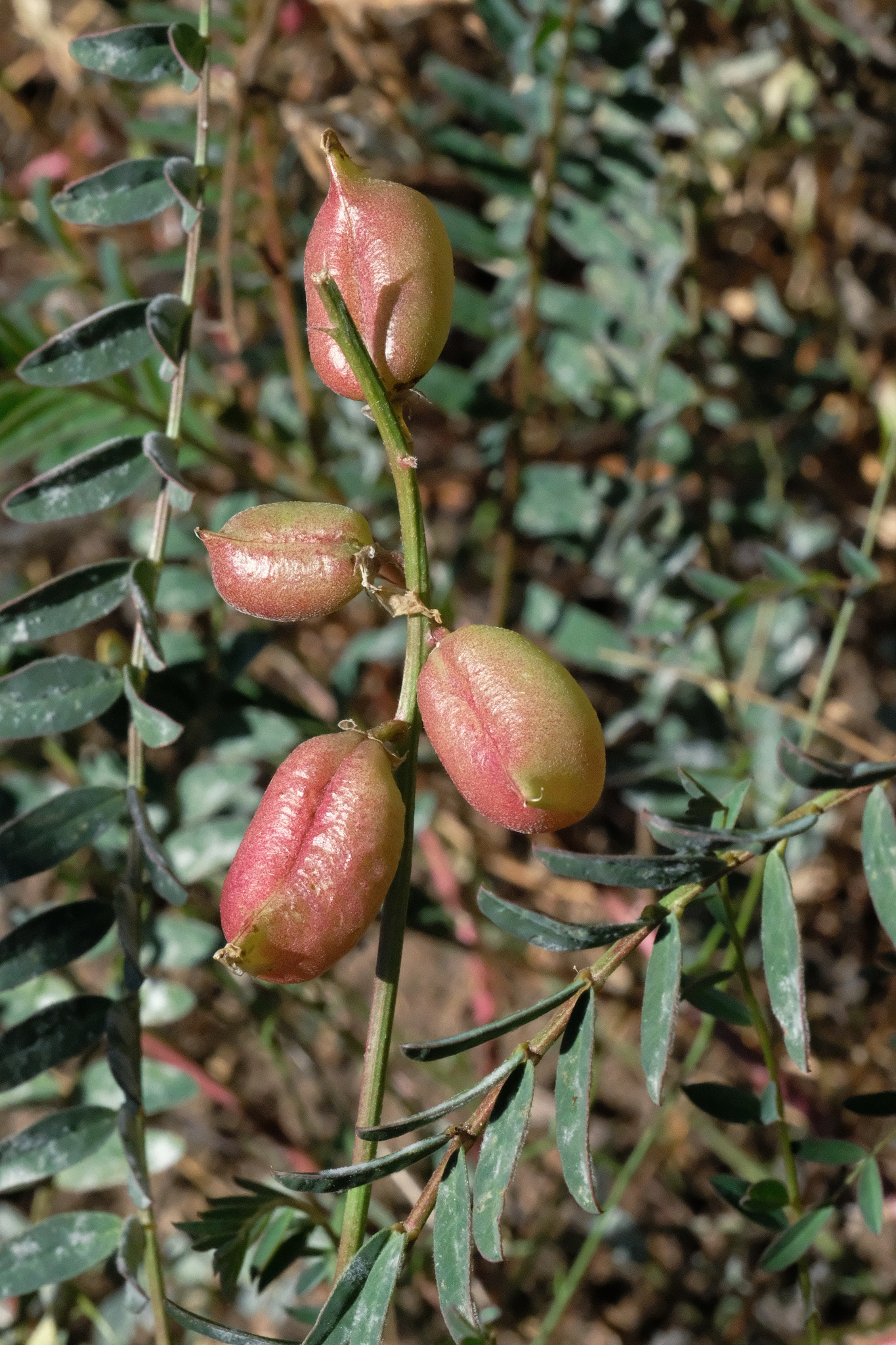

Conservation status
- Imperiled (NatureServe)

Scientific classification
- Kingdom: Plantae
- Clade: Tracheophytes
- Clade: Angiosperms
- Clade: Eudicots
- Clade: Rosids
- Order: Fabales
- Family: Fabaceae
- Subfamily: Faboideae
- Genus: Astragalus
- Species: A. oocarpus

Binomial name
- Astragalus oocarpus A.Gray

= Astragalus oocarpus =

Species of legume

Astragalus oocarpus is a rare species of milkvetch known by the common names San Diego milkvetch and Descanso milkvetch.

It is endemic to southern California, where it is known only from the Peninsular Ranges of San Diego County. Its range may extend north into Riverside County. It is a plant of the chaparral slopes and woodlands of the mountains.

== Description ==
Astragalus oocarpus is a perennial herb producing upright to erect hollow stems up to 1.3 meters tall. Leaves are up to 17 centimeters long and are made up of veiny lance-shaped leaflets each up to 3 centimeters in length. The stem and leaves are mostly hairless.

The inflorescence holds up to 75 cream-colored flowers, each between 1 and 2 centimeters in length. The fruit is an inflated legume pod 1.5 to 2.5 centimeters long which dries to a stiff papery texture.

== See also ==
- California chaparral and woodlands
  - California montane chaparral and woodlands
- Natural history of the Peninsular Ranges
