= Climbing bedstraw =

Climbing bedstraw is a common name for several plants and may refer to:

- Galium nuttallii, native from Oregon to Baja California
- Galium porrigens, native from Santa Barbara County, California to Baja California
