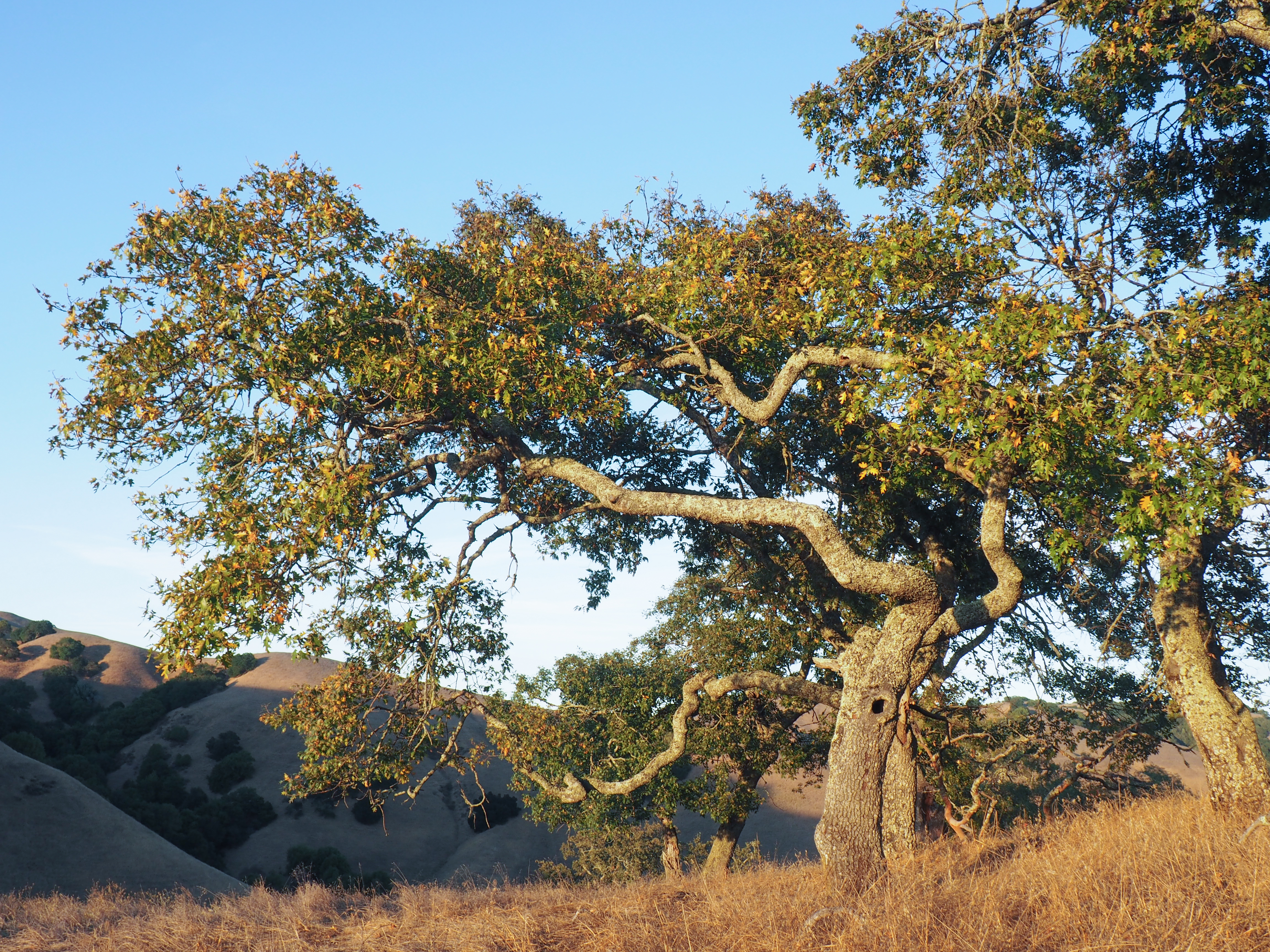

Conservation status
- Least Concern (IUCN 3.1)

Scientific classification
- Kingdom: Plantae
- Clade: Tracheophytes
- Clade: Angiosperms
- Clade: Eudicots
- Clade: Rosids
- Order: Fagales
- Family: Fagaceae
- Genus: Quercus
- Subgenus: Quercus subg. Quercus
- Section: Quercus sect. Lobatae
- Species: Q. kelloggii

Binomial name
- Quercus kelloggii Newberry
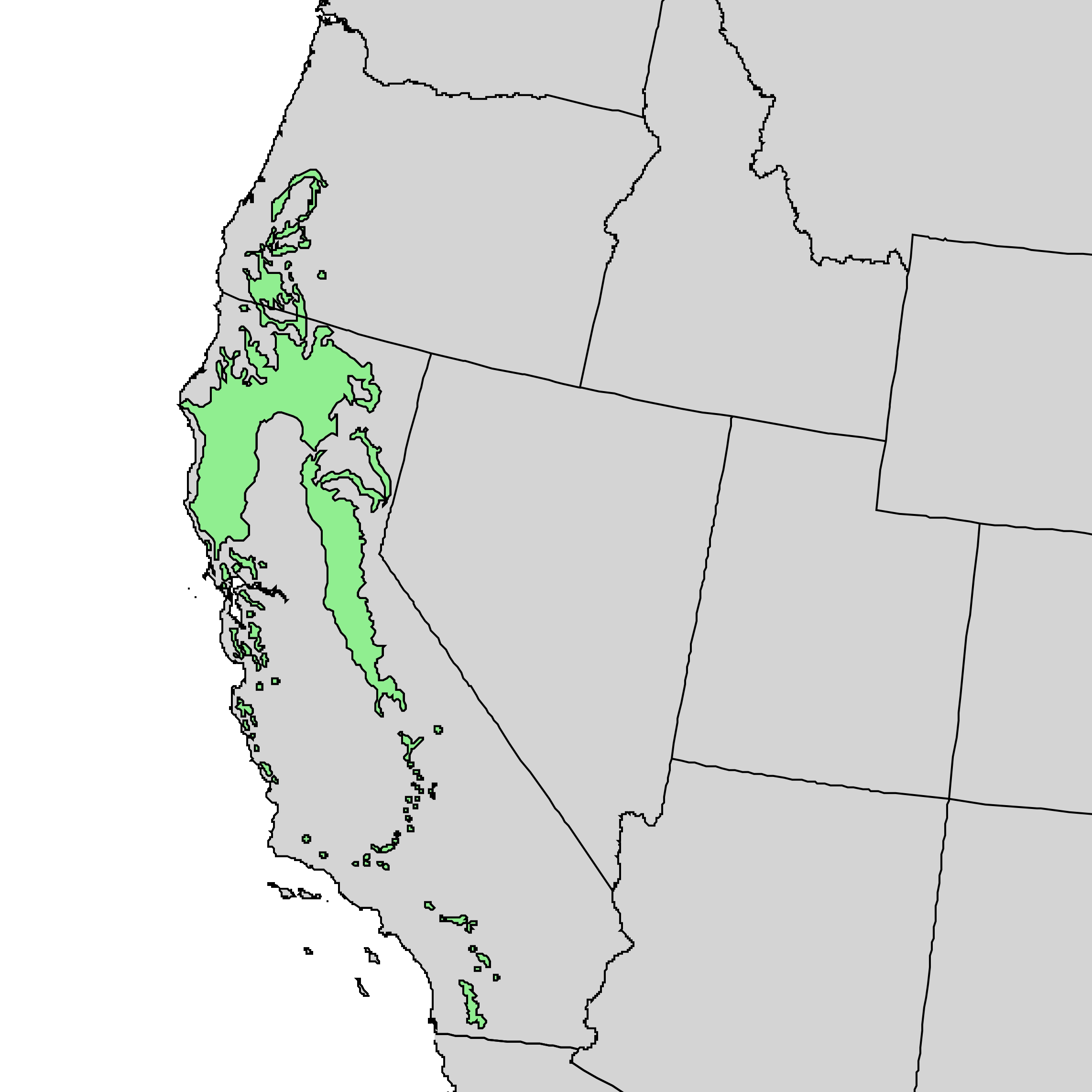
- Natural range

Synonyms
- Quercus californica (Torr.) Cooper; Quercus sonomensis Benth. ex A.DC.; Quercus tinctoria var. californica Torr.

= Quercus kelloggii =

Species of oak tree

Quercus kelloggii, the California black oak or Kellogg oak, is an oak in the red oak section (genus Quercus, section Lobatae, series Agrifoliae) native to western North America.

== Description ==
Quercus kelloggii grows from one to several vertical roots which penetrate to bedrock, with large, laterally spreading roots extending off from vertical ones. It also has a number of surface roots. It can reproduce vegetatively with new growth sprouting from the root crown after the tree is top-killed by wildfire, logging, frost, or other events. While individual trees generally have a lifespan between 100 and 200 years, California black oak can live up to 500 years.

The tree typically grows from 9–25 meters (30–82 feet) in height and from 0.3–1.4 m (1–4 1/2 ft) in diameter. Large trees may exceed 36 m (118 ft) in height and 1.6 m (5 ft 3 in) diameter, with the record holder measuring 38 m (124 ft) tall and 2.7 m (9 ft) thick (in the Siskiyou National Forest in Oregon). The species also grows in shrubby scrub-oak form on poor sites. In open areas, the crown is broad and rounded, with lower branches nearly touching the ground or forming a browse line. In closed stands, the crown is narrow and slender in young trees and irregularly broad in old trees. Trunks are usually free of branches on the lower 6–12 m (20–39 ft) in closed stands. Trunks are often forked, and usually decayed and hollow in older trees. The bark is thin and smooth in young trees, becoming thick, ridged, plate-like, and blackish with age.

The leaves are typically 10–25 centimeters (4–10 in) long and deeply lobed, usually into seven portions; they are red and velvety when young, turning yellow-green then orange-brown in autumn. Blooming late in spring, the species is monoecious, with male flowers in catkins and females in leaf axils. The acorns are relatively large, from 2.5–4 cm (1–1 1/2 in) long and 1.5–1.8 cm (1/2–3/4 in) wide.

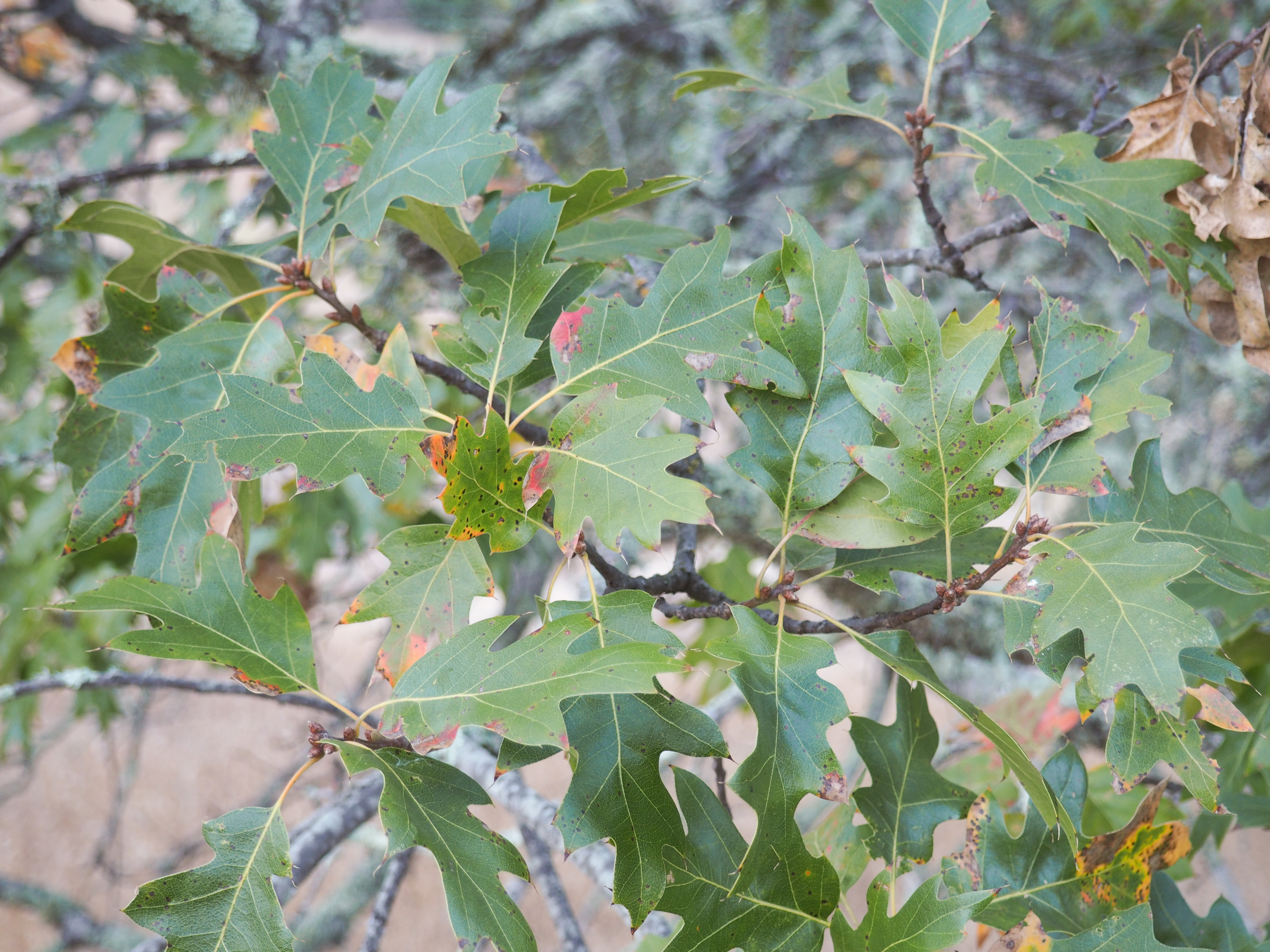
Detail of the leaves

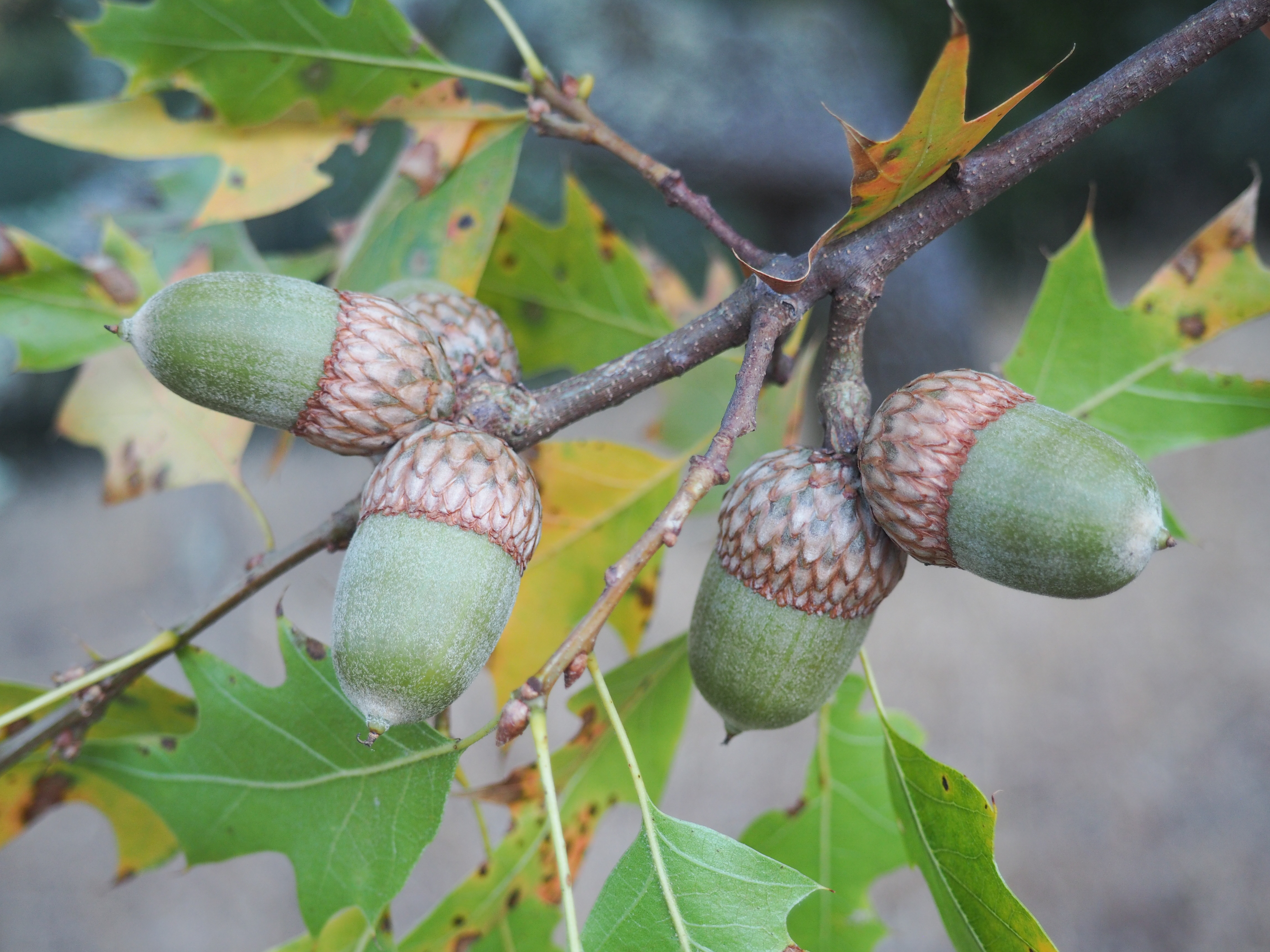
The acorns

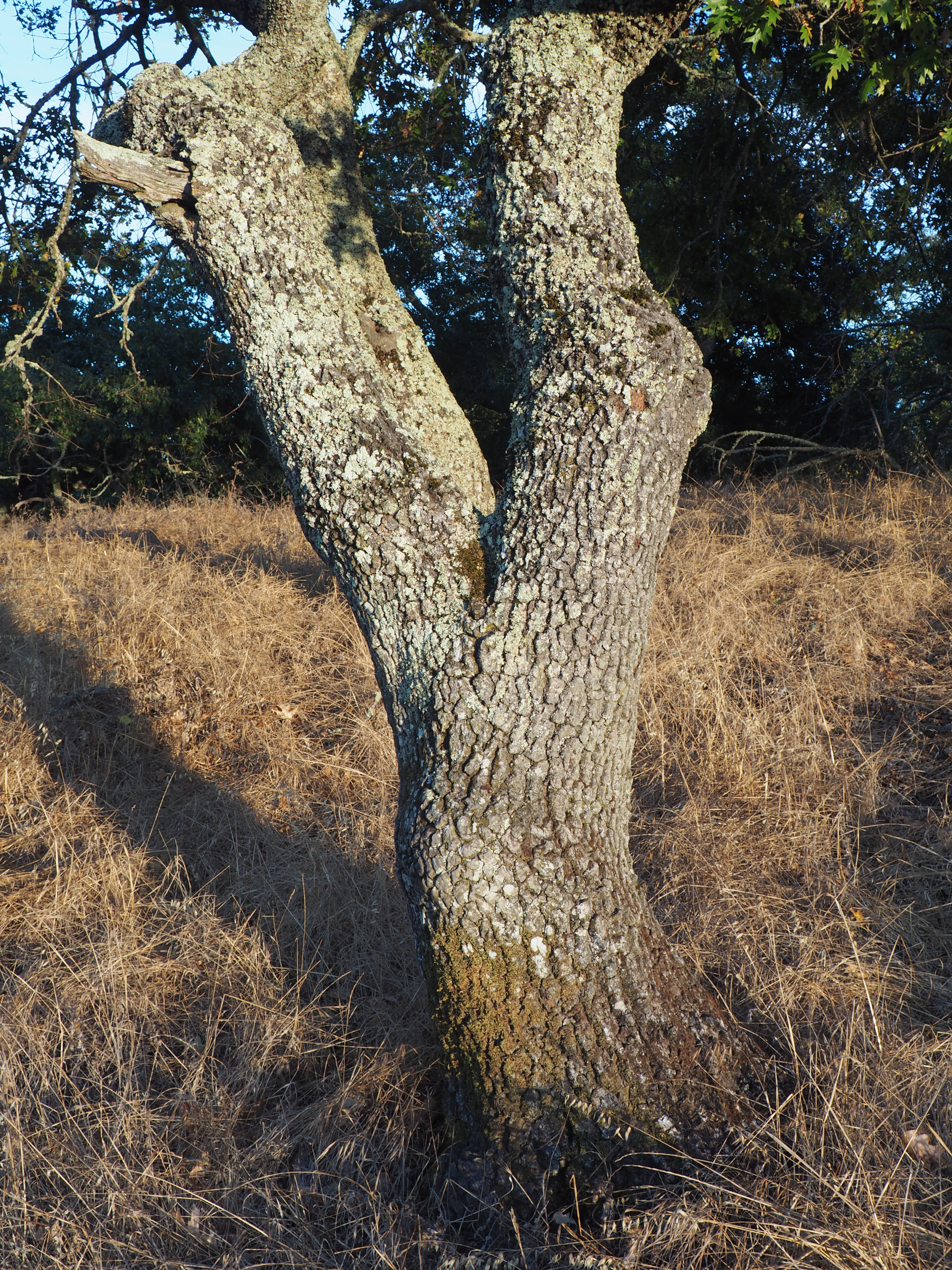
Mature bark texture

=== Similar species ===
Its leaves (but not its fruit) appear very similar to several other members of the red oak section, including the red oak (Quercus rubra) and the black oak (Quercus velutina) found in eastern and central North America, despite being genetically separated from them for more than 20 million years.

It hybridizes with Quercus wislizeni.

== Distribution and habitat ==
California black oak is a deciduous tree growing in mixed evergreen forests, oak woodlands, and coniferous forests. California black oak is distributed along foothills and lower mountains of California and western Oregon. It can be found at elevations of up to 1,800 m (5,900 ft), for example near Mount Shasta.

It is found from Lane County, Oregon, south through the Cascade Range, the Sierra Nevada, and the Coast, Transverse, and Peninsular Ranges to San Diego County, California. The tree occurs in pure or mixed stands. Pure stands usually indicate sites unfavorable to conifer growth or recurring disturbance such as fire or logging activities. The tree can grow in many types of soils, but they must be well-drained.

== Ecology ==
The California black oak is a critical species for wildlife. Oaks (Quercus spp.) may be the single most important genus used by wildlife for food and cover in California forests and rangelands, and California black oak occupies more total area in California than any other hardwood species. Livestock also make heavy use of this species for food and cover.

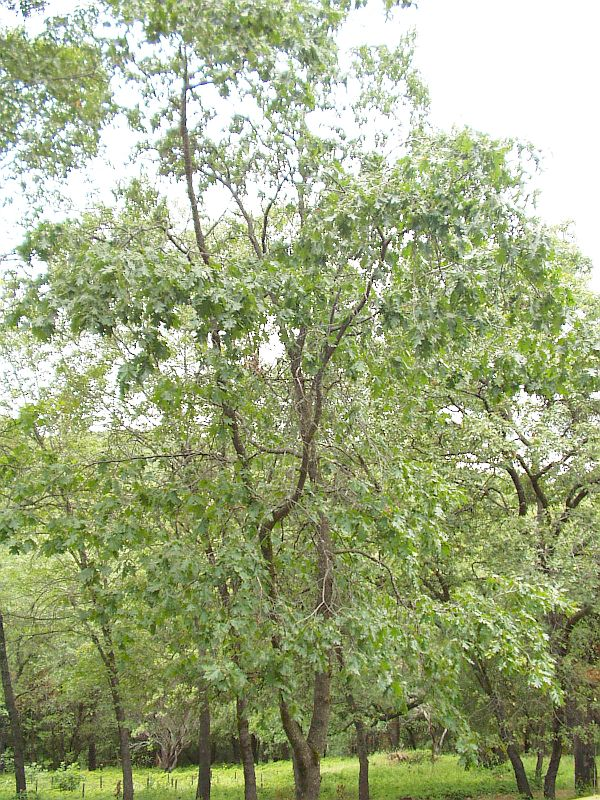
Young California black oaks

Older trees affected by heart rot have cavities which provide den or nest sites for owls, various woodpeckers, tree squirrels, and American black bears. Trees provide valuable shade for livestock and wildlife during the hot summer. California black oak forest types are heavily used for spring, summer, and fall cover by black bears.

It is browsed by deer and livestock. Acorns are heavily used by livestock, mule deer, feral pigs, rodents, mountain quail, Steller's jays, and woodpeckers. Acorns constitute an average of 50% of the fall and winter diets of western gray squirrels and black-tailed deer during good mast years. Fawn survival rates increase or decrease with the size of the acorn crop.

It is a preferred foraging substrate for many birds. All of 68 bird species observed in oak woodlands of the Tehachapi Mountains of California used California black oak for part of their foraging activities. Acorn woodpecker, Bullock's oriole, and Nashville warbler show strong preferences for California black oak. The parasitic plant Pacific mistletoe (Phoradendron villosum), which commonly grows on this oak, produces berries that attract birds, as well.

Many animals cache the acorns, and acorns that have been stored in the ground or otherwise buried are more likely to sprout than those that remain on the surface.

The tree is adapted to wildfire. It is protected from smaller fires by its thick bark. If it is top-killed and burned away in a larger fire, it easily resprouts and has a good supply of nutrients and water stored in its root system. Acorns sprout into seedlings after fire, and sites that have been cleared of canopy and leaf litter in fires are ideal for seedling success.

The tree is less shade tolerant than its associate ponderosa pine. It is vulnerable to sudden oak death.

== Allergenicity ==
The pollen is released in spring and is a severe allergen.

== Uses ==
Some California Native Americans prefer California black oak acorns over those of other species for making acorn meal. Historically, this acorn was a staple food for many Native American groups, who usually leached out the bitter tannin. Native Americans recognized the importance of fire to this oak, and purposely lit fires in oak woodlands to promote its health and ensure their food source.

The wood is used for making furniture, pallets, and construction timber. The tree is used as an ornamental.

=== Timber ===
California black oak comprises a total volume of 29% of California's hardwood timber resources, and is the major hardwood sawn into lumber there. The total estimated area of species occurrence is 361,800 hectares (3,618 square kilometers or 894,000 acres); 239,200 ha (2,392 km^{2} or 591,000 acres) of timberland and 122,600 ha (1,226 km^{2} or 303,000 acres) of woodland. Of this land 60% is privately owned, 31% is in National Forests, and 9% is on other public lands. It has greatly decreased from its historic abundance. This is due to a number of factors, including drought, disease, animal foraging, logging practices, fire suppression, and a variety of other human impacts. Cutting green trees for fuelwood has contributed to the decline of this species, and illegal harvesting of green trees from public lands is a continuing problem.

It was long considered by foresters and government agencies to be a weed tree. In its earlier years, its only use to settlers was to feed the boilers of donkey engines bringing in the valuable pine and fir logs. For a period in the mid-1960s, the U.S. Forest Service policy in California's National Forests was systematic extermination of California black oak by girdling the trees. The objective was to make room for more coniferous growth. In the rush to use the pines, firs, and redwoods, the dense hardwoods were looked on with contempt. Like a few other visionaries in the 1960s, Guy Hall thought the California black oak presented a beautiful challenge that deserved better than eradication. In 1965, Hall convinced federal agencies to cease their extermination policies.

Plantations of California black oak have been successfully established in clearcuts from acorn plantings. Thinning such stands promotes stand productivity and wood quality, and is recommended when trees are from 9–15 m (30–49 ft) tall or when stand density (basal area) exceeds 29 m^{2}/ha (125 ft^{2}/acre). This tree has also been managed for hardwood production by maintaining scattered pure stands within coniferous forests. Stands of this species often establish on poorer sites, where conifer seedling establishment has not been successful.

=== Cultivation ===
Q. kelloggii is cultivated in the specialty horticulture trade as an ornamental tree for native plant, drought-tolerant, water-conserving, and habitat gardens, and various types of municipal, commercial, and agency sustainable landscape and restoration projects.

== See also ==
- Black oak (disambiguation)
- Mediterranean California lower montane black oak–conifer forest – plant association
- California chaparral and woodlands – ecoregion
- California montane chaparral and woodlands – subecoregion
- California interior chaparral and woodlands – subecoregion
