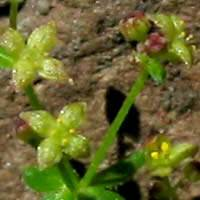

Scientific classification
- Kingdom: Plantae
- Clade: Tracheophytes
- Clade: Angiosperms
- Clade: Eudicots
- Clade: Asterids
- Order: Gentianales
- Family: Rubiaceae
- Genus: Galium
- Species: G. nuttallii

Binomial name
- Galium nuttallii A.Gray

Synonyms
- Galium suffruticosum Nutt. in J.Torrey & A.Gray 1841, illegitimate homonym of Galium suffruticosum Hook. & Arn. 1833.

= Galium nuttallii =

Species of plant

Galium nuttallii is a species of flowering plant in the coffee family known by the common names San Diego bedstraw and climbing bedstraw. It is native to the coast and coastal Peninsular and western Transverse Ranges of southern California and Baja California, where it is a member of chaparral and pine woodland plant communities. It is also found on the Channel Islands and on the mainland as far north as Santa Barbara County.

== Description ==
Galium nuttallii is a climbing perennial herb producing a woody base and sprawling with thin, hanging green to red branches up to 1.5 meters long. The stems have whorls of four tiny sharp-pointed leaves at intervals, each leaf under a centimeter long. The plant is dioecious, with male and female individuals bearing different flower types. Both flowers are reddish, and the female flower ovary turns into a berry.

== Subspecies ==
Two subspecies are recognized as of May 2014:

- Galium nuttallii subsp. insulare Ferris - southern Channel Islands of California
- Galium nuttallii subsp. nuttallii - mainland California and Baja California

== See also ==
- California chaparral and woodlands
- California coastal sage and chaparral
- California montane chaparral and woodlands
