= Chionodes powelli =

Scientific classification
- Kingdom: Animalia
- Phylum: Arthropoda
- Clade: Pancrustacea
- Class: Insecta
- Order: Lepidoptera
- Family: Gelechiidae
- Genus: Chionodes
- Species: C. powelli

Binomial name
- Chionodes powelli Hodges, 1999

Species of moth

Chionodes powelli is a moth in the family Gelechiidae. It is found in North America, where it has been recorded from California, Oregon, Washington, Texas, Oklahoma, Arkansas, Louisiana, Mississippi and Florida.

The larvae feed on Quercus lobata, Quercus kelloggii and Quercus garryana.
