= California Chaparral Institute =

U.S. non-profit organization

- Founded at: Escondido, Southern California
- Type: non-profit organization

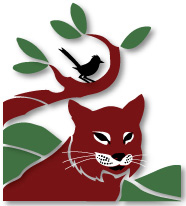
The California Chaparral Institute logo.

The California Chaparral Institute is a non-profit organization for the research and conservation of chaparral habitats in California. It is based in Escondido, Southern California.

== Description ==
It is composed of naturalists, scientists, wildland firefighters, and educators who value the chaparral as both a valuable resource and a place to enjoy the wilderness. It was founded in 2004 by Richard W. Halsey and aims to protect the California chaparral ecosystem through public education and legal action.

== Fire ecology and conservation ==
In particular, based on fire ecology, the research group is known for opposing the clearance of chaparral habitat from natural areas, and to require an environmental review of any such habitat destruction proposals before their implementation.

In June 2010 the group filed suit against an "emergency" habitat clearance project by San Diego County, and a San Diego Superior Court judge agreed that the county should conduct an environmental review first.

The group has also objected to similar plans by the U.S. Forest Service to clear native habitat in the Cleveland National Forest and the Los Padres National Forest. They argue that removing chaparral, through clearance or prescribed burns, promotes the invasive growth of non-native weeds and grasses which are even more of a fire hazard. They have expressed concern that the combination of habitat clearance and massive wildfires, especially as the climate dries due to human-caused climate change, could eliminate much of the chaparral in southern California within a century.

In April 2010 they came to the defense of Joseph Diliberti, a Vietnam veteran, who eventually lost his home over his refusal to pay a $27,552 charge by a private contractor (Fire Prevention Services, Inc.) that cleared about a half acre of native habitat from his property under direction of the San Diego Rural Fire Protection District. As Diliberti continued to refuse to pay, San Diego County assumed the contractor's forced weed abatement lien. Between fees and interest, the bill grew to more than $72,000. The County of San Diego sold the property during public auction in March 2014.

The California Chaparral Institute has also proposed that residential communities should not be built in the most fire-prone areas.

== Education and research ==
The Institute began the Chaparral Naturalist Certification program in 2015 to help fill the void in the public's knowledge of the chaparral plant community. It has also published a number of publications on chaparral ecology, fire behavior, and nature education philosophy.

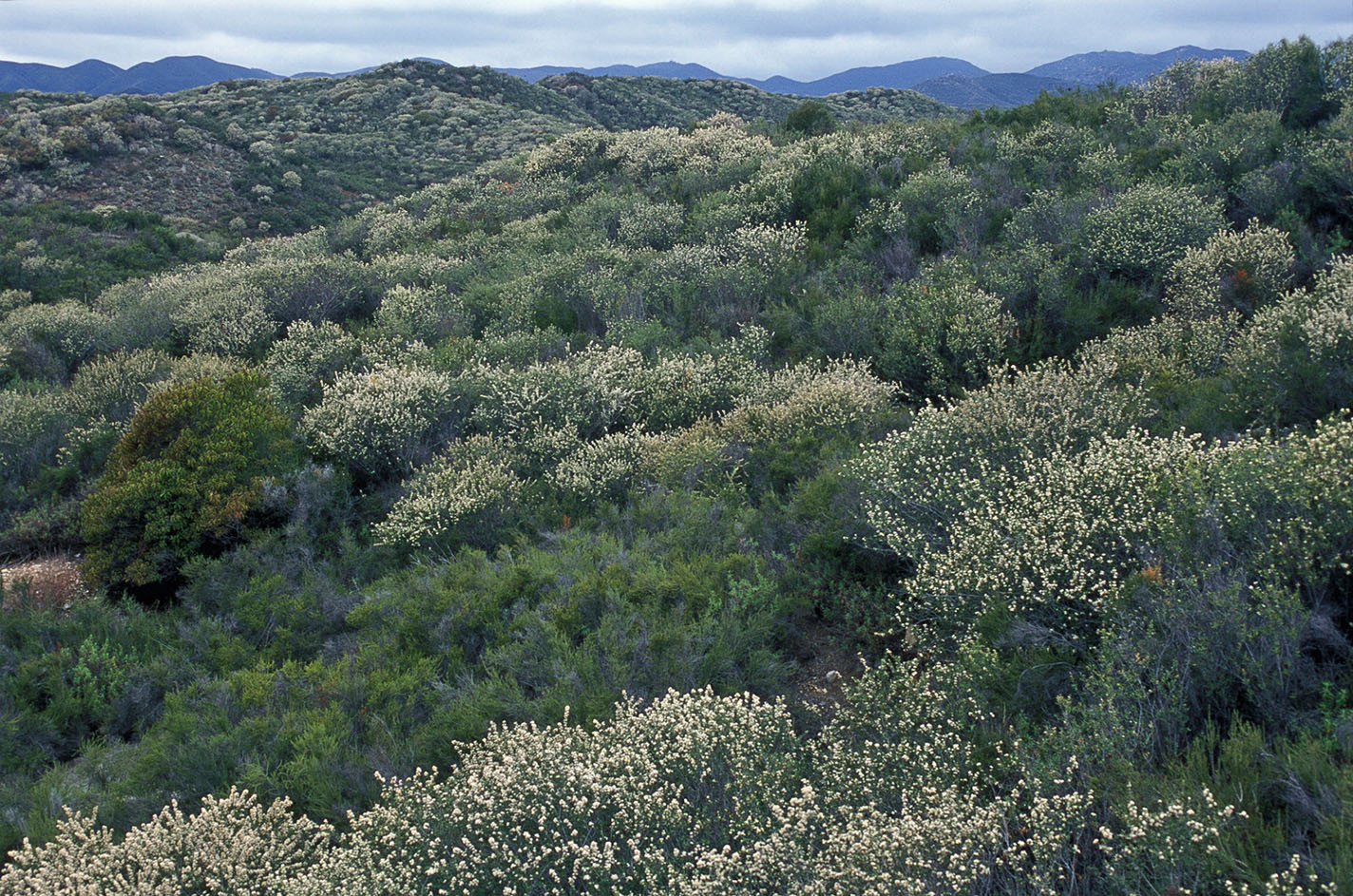
Ceanothus chaparral in the Cleveland National Forest

== California chaparral and woodlands ecoregion ==
The California chaparral and woodlands ecoregion is in the Mediterranean forests, woodlands, and scrub biome. It is one of the biome's only five Mediterranean chaparral ecoregions in the world.

=== Sub−ecoregions ===
- California coastal sage and chaparral
- California interior chaparral and woodlands
- California montane chaparral and woodlands

=== Plant communities ===
- Coastal sage scrub
- California coastal prairie
- Northern coastal scrub

== See also ==
- California chaparral and woodlands—related topics
- Flora of California chaparral and woodlands
- Fauna of the California chaparral and woodlands
