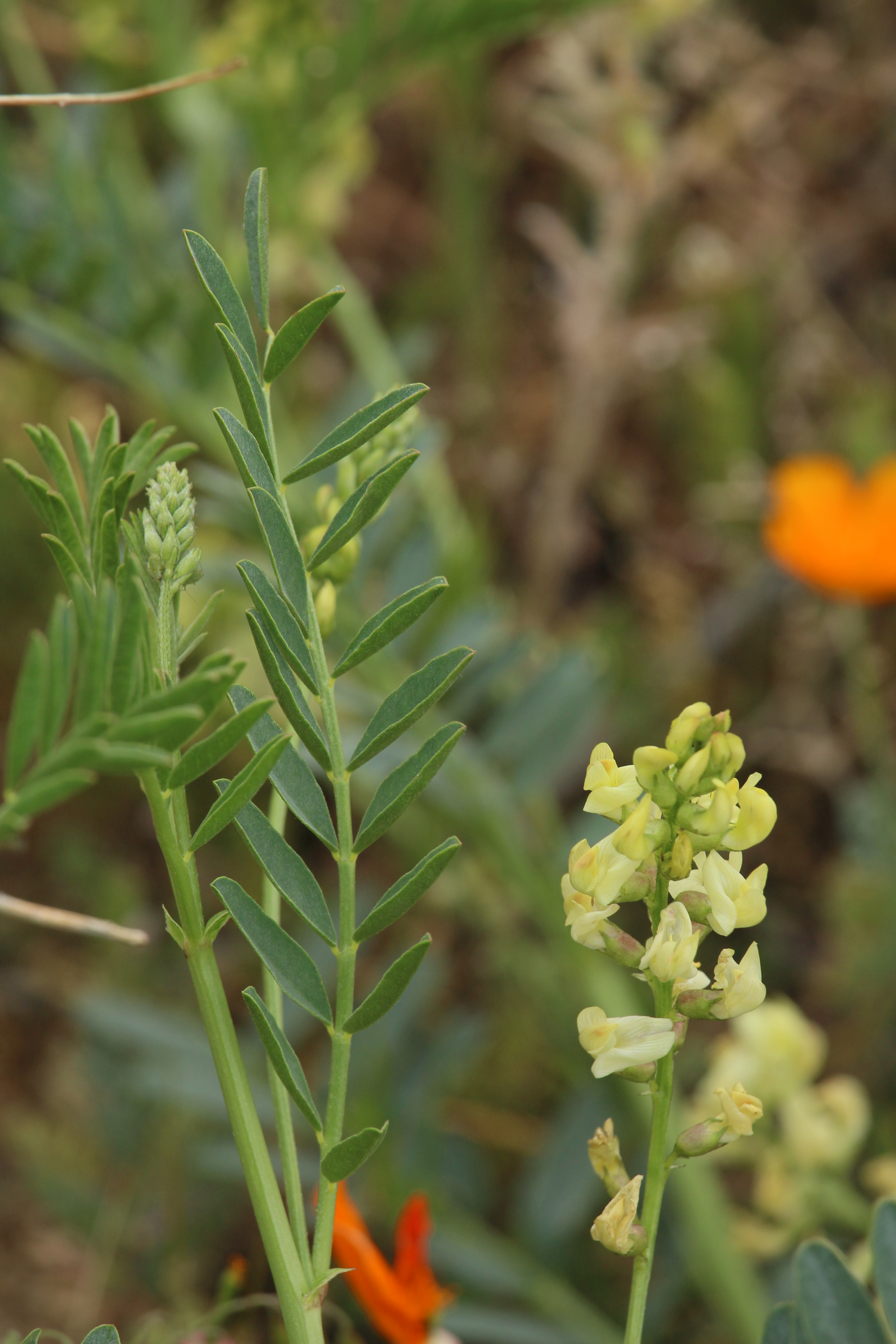

Scientific classification
- Kingdom: Plantae
- Clade: Tracheophytes
- Clade: Angiosperms
- Clade: Eudicots
- Clade: Rosids
- Order: Fabales
- Family: Fabaceae
- Subfamily: Faboideae
- Genus: Astragalus
- Species: A. douglasii

Binomial name
- Astragalus douglasii (Torr. & A. Gray) A. Gray

= Astragalus douglasii =

Douglas's milkvetch

Species of plant

Astragalus douglasii is a species of milkvetch known by the common name Douglas's milkvetch. It is native to California and Baja California, where it can be found in many types of desert, valley, chaparral and woodlands, and montane habitats, usually below 8,000 feet (2,400 m) elevation.

== Description ==
Astragalus douglasii is a bushy perennial herb producing a number of erect or prostrate stems up to a meter long. The abundant leaves are up to 18 centimeters long and are made up of oval-shaped leaflets. The open inflorescence holds up to 30 whitish to pale yellow flowers, each about a centimeter long. The calyx is green with 0.7–2.6 mm (0.03–0.10 in) lobes.

The fruit is an inflated legume pod up to 6 centimeters long and 3 wide which dries to a thin, papery texture.

=== Varieties ===
There are three varieties of Astragalus douglasii:

- A. d. var. douglasii – limited to California
- A. d. var. parishii (Parish's milkvetch) – found throughout the mountain ranges of Southern California
- A. d. var. perstrictus (Jacumba milkvetch) – rare variety limited to San Diego County, California, and northern Baja California
