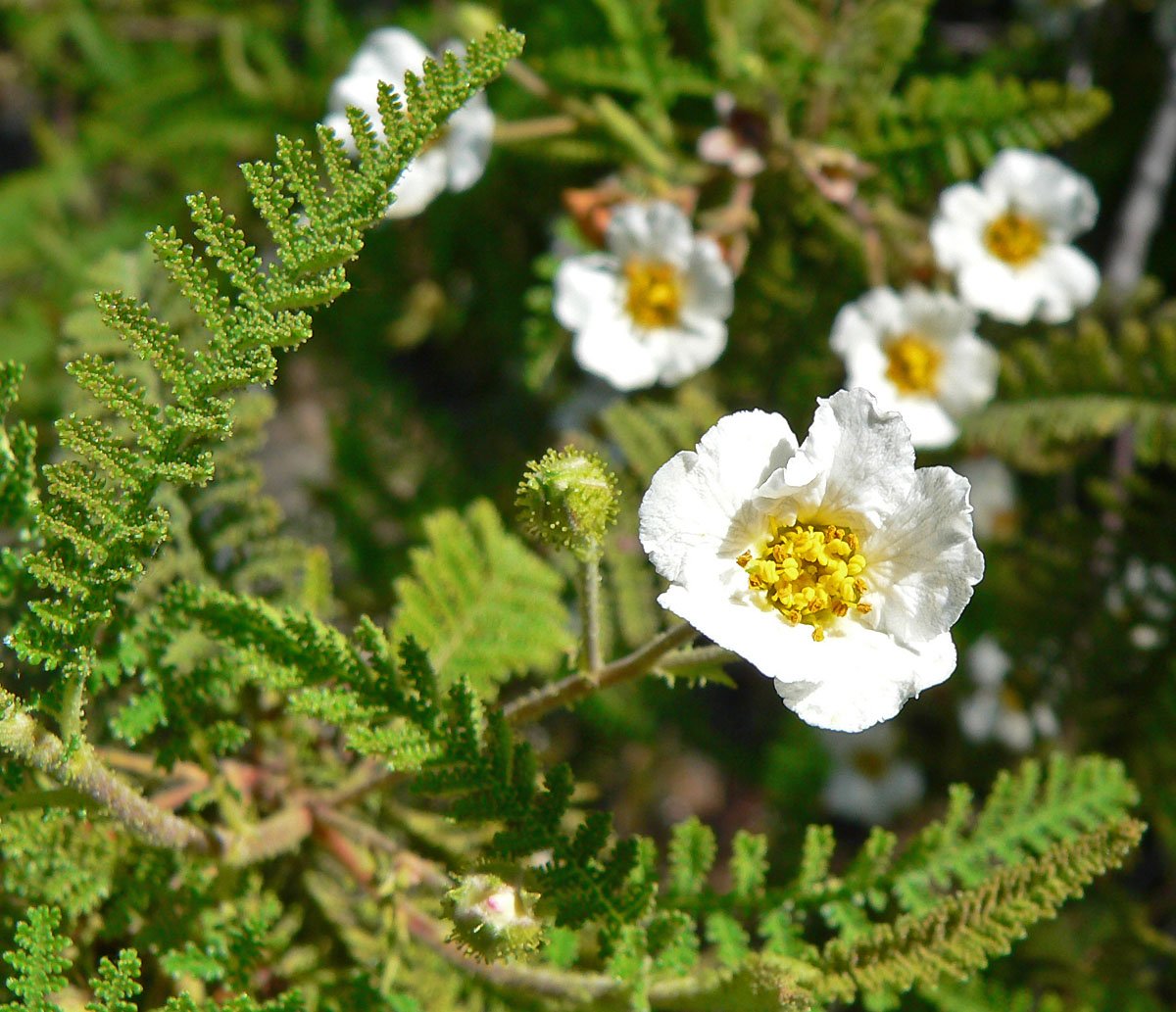
- Chamaebatia australis

Scientific classification
- Kingdom: Plantae
- Clade: Tracheophytes
- Clade: Angiosperms
- Clade: Eudicots
- Clade: Rosids
- Order: Rosales
- Family: Rosaceae
- Subfamily: Dryadoideae
- Genus: Chamaebatia; Benth.

Species
- 2; see text.

= Chamaebatia =

Genus of evergreen shrubs in the rose family

Chamaebatia, also known as mountain misery, is a genus of two species of aromatic evergreen shrubs endemic to California. Its English common name derives from early settlers' experience with the plant's dense tangle and sticky, strong-smelling resin. They are actinorhizal, non-legumes capable of nitrogen fixation through symbiosis with the actinobacterium, Frankia.

== Taxonomy ==
=== Species ===
Chamaebatia comprises the following species:

- Chamaebatia australis (Brandegee) Abrams – Southern mountain misery
- Chamaebatia foliolosa Benth. – Sierra mountain misery, bearclover, kit-kit-dizze

=== Species names with uncertain taxonomic status ===
The status of the following species is unresolved:

- Chamaebatia foliolosa Newb.
