= Sierra Nevada lower montane forest =

Biotic zone in California

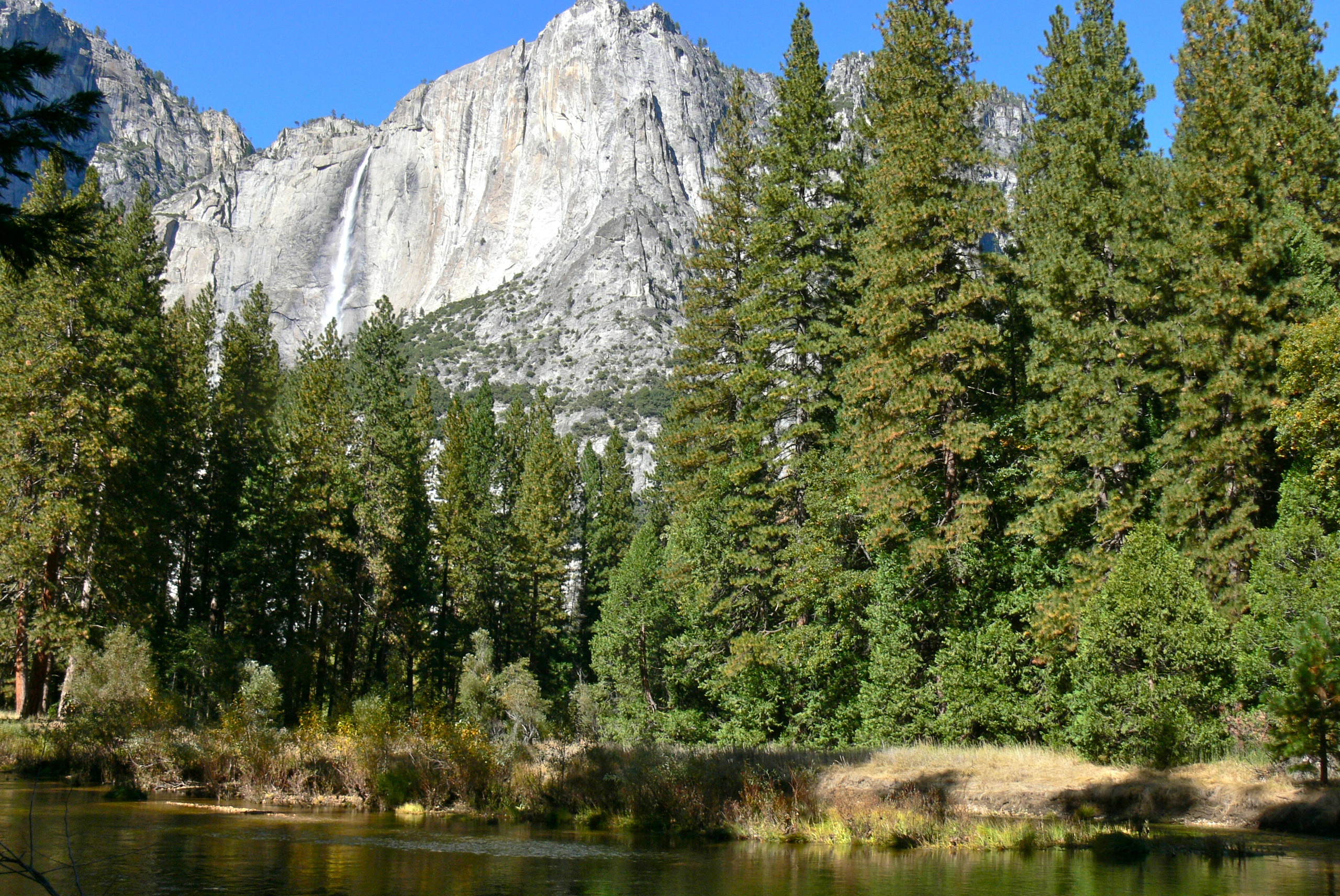
An example of lower montane forest in Yosemite Valley.

The Sierra Nevada lower montane forest is a plant community along a strip along the western and eastern edges of the Sierra Nevada mountain range in California. This zone is also known as a yellow pine forest.

Moving southward, the elevation range of the lower montane forest grows. Its elevation range at the northern end of the Sierra is from 1,200–5,500 feet (370–1,680 m). In the central Sierra, its elevation range is from 3,000–7,000 feet (910–2,130 m). In the southern end of the Sierra, its range is from 2,500–9,000 feet (760–2,740 m).

The daily high temperature in the summer is 80–90 °F (27–32 °C), while the daily lows in winter are around 28–34 °F (−2–1 °C). Annual precipitation depends on elevation: Yosemite Valley at 4,000 feet (1,200 m) gets 37 inches (940 mm) a year.

At the lower elevation of this forest, the hot, dry summers and cool, moist winters of the Mediterranean climate give rise to the lower montane forest zone. The accumulation of several feet of snow during the winter is not uncommon and can stay on the ground for several months. The diversity of tree species found in this zone make this a beautiful and interesting forest to explore. The indicator species for the lower montane forest are the ponderosa pine and the Jeffrey pine. Ponderosa pines are common in the west side forests at lower elevations. Jeffrey pines are commonly found in the East side forests at higher elevations and in drier areas.

The lower montane forests also include trees such as California black oak, sugar pine, incense-cedar, and white fir. The giant sequoia groves of the Sierra Nevada are also found within this biotic zone. Animals that may be found in this zone include the dark-eyed junco, mountain chickadee, western gray squirrel, mule deer, and American black bear. The lower montane forest can be seen in Yosemite Valley and along the Wawona, Hetch Hetchy, and Big Oak Flat Roads.

The lower montane forest consists of several layers:

- Mostly secondary growth with partial to complete canopy closure
- A understory consisting either of smaller trees or discontinuous shrubs
- A low herbaceous cover
- A woody fuel and litter layer

Some threats to the lower montane forests include logging, grazing, changing fire regimes, fragmentation due to development, climate change, and pest outbreaks.

== Flora ==
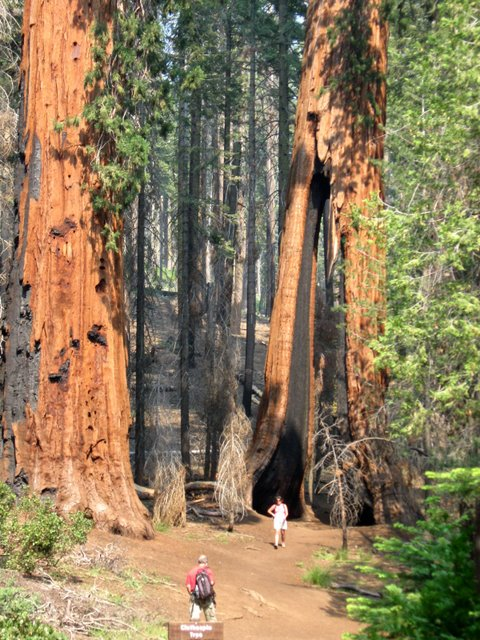
Giant sequoia in the Mariposa Grove, Yosemite, at approximately 6,400 feet (2,000 m) of elevation

Common lower montane forest species of trees include:

- Ponderosa pine (Pinus ponderosa)
- Jeffrey pine (Pinus jeffreyi)
- Sugar pine (Pinus lambertiana)
- Douglas fir (Pseudotsuga menziesii)
- White fir (Abies concolor)
- Giant sequoia (Sequoiadendron giganteum)
- Incense cedar (Calocedrus decurrens)
- Black oak (Quercus kelloggii)
- Bigleaf maple (Acer macrophyllum)

Understory shrubs include:

- Mountain misery (Chamaebatia foliolosa)
- Wild currants (Ribes sp.)
- Berries (Rubus sp.)
- Manzanitas (Arctostaphylos sp.)
- California lilacs (Ceanothus sp.)
- White alder (Alnus rhombifolia)

== See also ==
- List of plants of the Sierra Nevada lower montane forest
- Ecology of the Sierra Nevada
- Foothill woodland

== Sources ==
- "Plants for Yellow Pine Forest". Las Pilitas Nursery.
