= Mediterranean California lower montane black oak–conifer forest =

The Mediterranean California lower montane black oak–conifer forest is a major forest association and ecosystem of the California mixed evergreen forest bioregion in certain mountain ranges in California and southern Oregon in the Western United States; and Baja California in northwest Mexico.

== Geography ==
From north to south, it is found in: the Klamath Range and inner North California Coast Ranges (between 915 and 1825 m); and continuing into the, in northern California (between 365 and 1675 m), in the western Sierra Nevada (between 600 and 2290 m), and in the Southern California Transverse and Peninsular Ranges (between 1525 and 2450 m).

Average annual precipitation in the lower montane black oak–conifer forest zones is between 65 and 200 cm, with a growing season that is between four and seven months.

== Flora ==
The lower montane black oak–conifer forest can have:

Trees

- California black oak (Quercus kelloggii)
- Coulter pine (Pinus coulteri) or 'big-cone pine'
- Jeffrey pine (Pinus jeffreyi) or 'western yellow pine'
- Ponderosa pine (Pinus ponderosa)
- Sugar pine (Pinus lambertiana)
- White fir (Abies concolor)
- Bigcone Douglas-fir (Pseudotsuga macrocarpa)
- Incense-cedar (Calocedrus decurrens)
- Canyon live oak (Quercus chrysolepis)
- Coast live oak (Quercus agrifolia)
- Knobcone pine (Pinus attenuata) – unique species occurrences
- Tecate cypress (Cypressus forbesii) – unique species occurrences

Shrubs

- Manzanita species
- Ceanothus species – i.e. deer brush (Ceanothus integerrimus)
- Yerba santa (Eriodictyon trichocalyx)
- Chrysolepis species – chinquapin (i.e. Chrysolepis sempervirens)
- Thimbleberry (Rubus parviflorus)
- Silk tassel bush (Garrya flavescens) – & grape soda lupine, lupine (L. formosus),
- Prunus species – native cherry
- California coffeeberry (Rhamnus californica)
- Ribes species – currants and gooseberries

== See also ==
- Sierra Nevada lower montane forest
- List of California native plants
- Plant communities of California

== Line notes ==
=== References ===
- On line Encyclopedia of Life; Ecological System Comprehensive Report. 2009.
- GlobalTwitcher.com - California Black Oak: Quercus kelloggii, ed. N. Stromberg. - C. Michael Hogan. 2008
