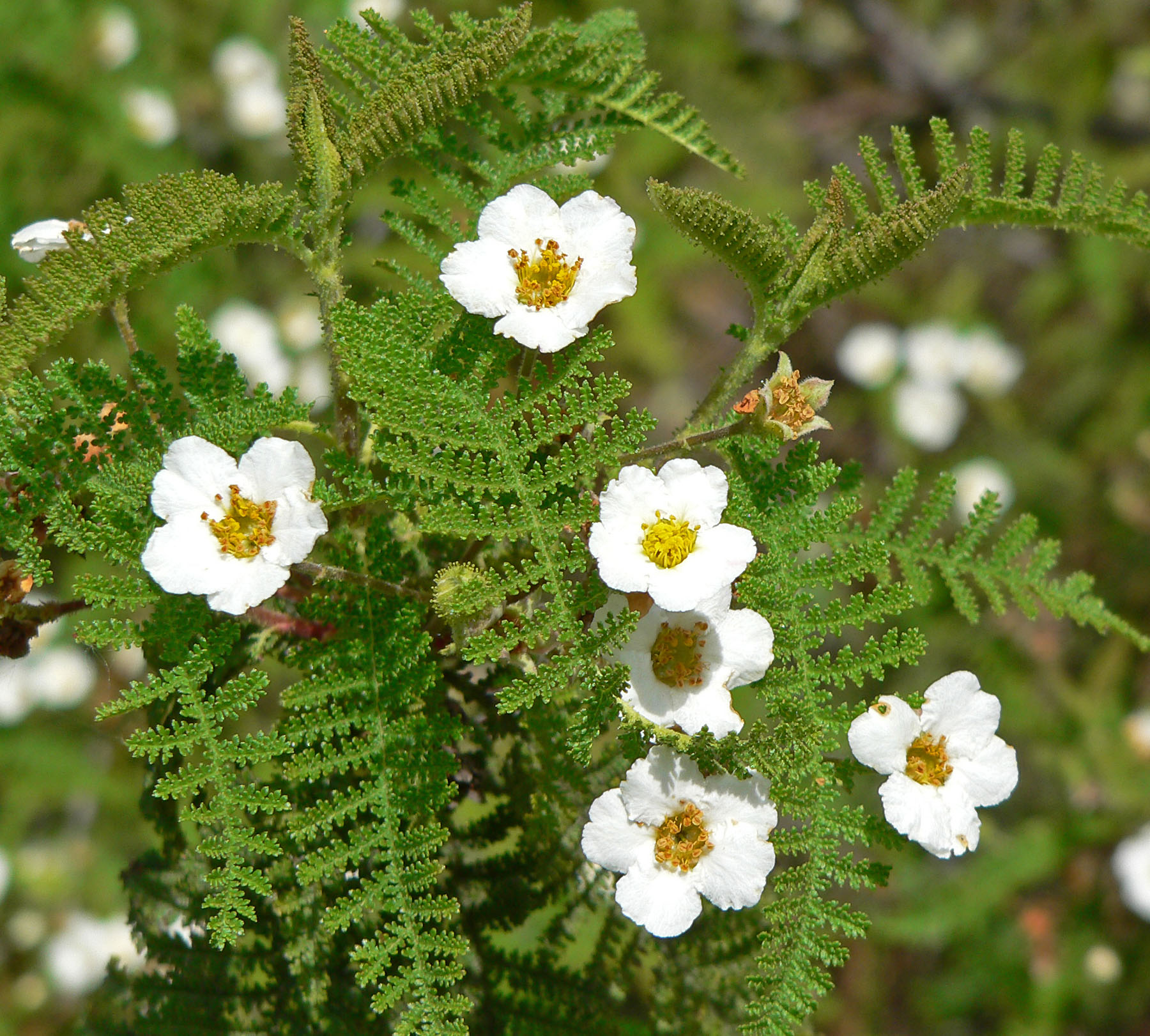

Conservation status
- Apparently Secure (NatureServe)

Scientific classification
- Kingdom: Plantae
- Clade: Tracheophytes
- Clade: Angiosperms
- Clade: Eudicots
- Clade: Rosids
- Order: Rosales
- Family: Rosaceae
- Genus: Chamaebatia
- Species: C. australis

Binomial name
- Chamaebatia australis (Brandeg.) Abrams

= Chamaebatia australis =

Species of flowering plant

Chamaebatia australis is a species of aromatic evergreen shrub in the rose family known by the common names southern mountain misery and southern bearclover. This uncommon shrub is native to the chaparral slopes of southern California and northern Baja California. It has very dark bark, and is covered in a foliage of 2-pinnate leaves, meaning leaves which are made up of small leaflets which are further divided themselves into tiny leaflets, giving the foliage a fernlike appearance. Each leaf is a gland-dotted frond of 3 to 8 centimetres (1.2 to 3.1 in) in length. The flowers are roselike with small rounded white petals and yellow centers filled with many stamens. The fruit is a leathery achene.
