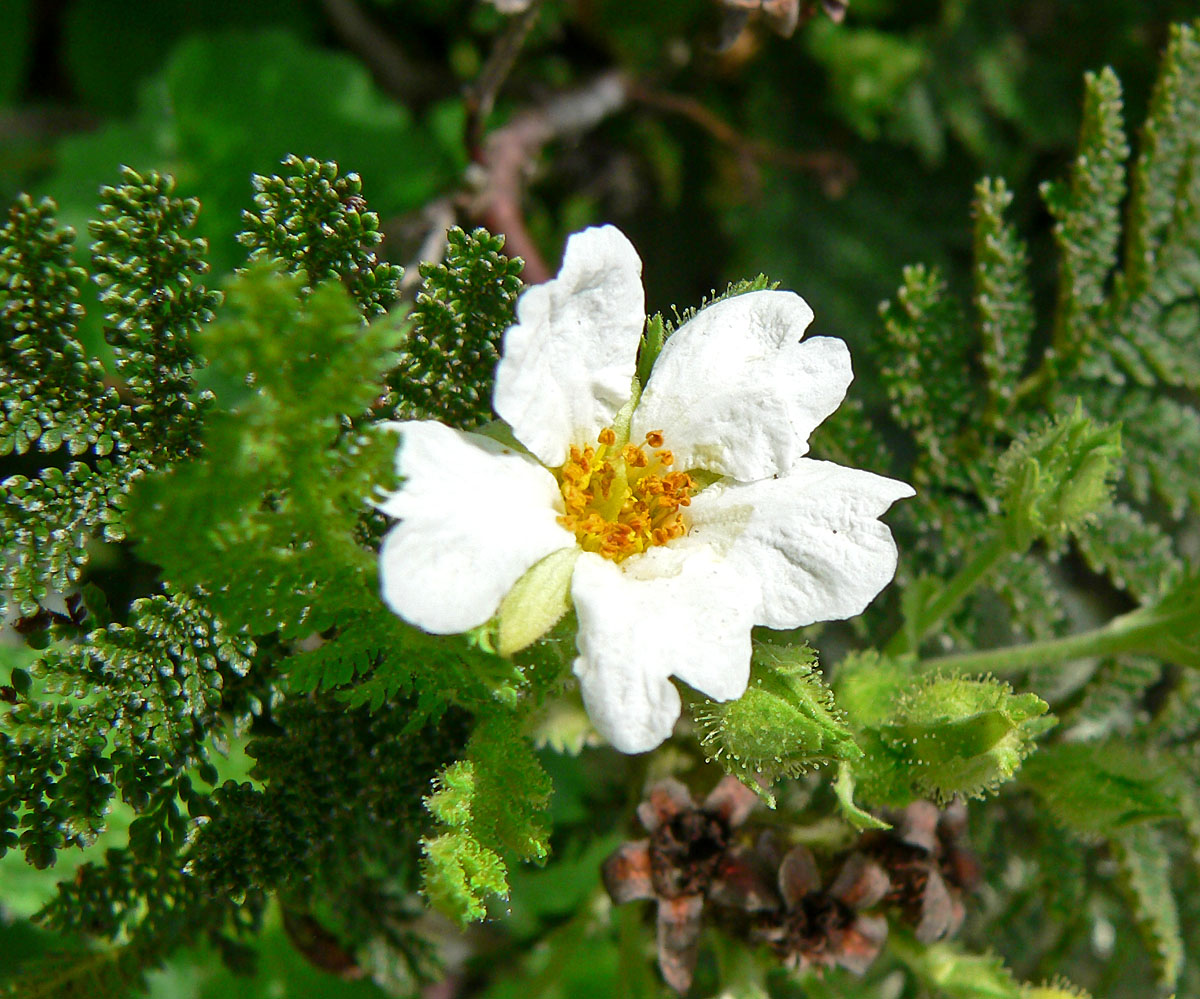

Conservation status
- Vulnerable (NatureServe)

Scientific classification
- Kingdom: Plantae
- Clade: Tracheophytes
- Clade: Angiosperms
- Clade: Eudicots
- Clade: Rosids
- Order: Rosales
- Family: Rosaceae
- Genus: Chamaebatia
- Species: C. foliolosa

Binomial name
- Chamaebatia foliolosa Benth.

= Chamaebatia foliolosa =

Species of flowering plant

Chamaebatia foliolosa is a North American species of aromatic evergreen shrub in the rose family known by the common names mountain misery, bearclover, and tarweed.

== Description ==
The stems are covered in dark brown bark. The fernlike foliage is made up of pinnate leaves up to 10 centimetres (4 in) long, with 8–17 main leaflets; these are made up of smaller leaflets. The leaves are dotted with sticky glands.

The roselike flowers have rounded white petals and yellow centers ringed with many stamens. The fruit is a brownish-black achene.

== Distribution and habitat ==
It is endemic to the mountains of California, where it grows in coniferous forests.

== Ecology ==
The species has been documented as carrying out nitrogen fixation, unusual for a plant in its family.

Black gum from the plant may stick to clothing, and it is highly flammable due to its resin.

== Uses ==
The Miwok, who called the plant kit-kit-dizze, used it as an herbal remedy for colds, coughs, rheumatism, chicken pox, measles, smallpox and other diseases.

== In culture ==
The name mountain misery comes from the California gold rush, when early pioneers would trip and fall from the dense, stinky brush.
