= Black Oak =

Black Oak may refer to:

== Places in the United States ==
- Black Oak, Arkansas
- Black Oak, Daviess County, Indiana
- Black Oak, Lake County, Indiana, a neighborhood of Gary, Indiana
- Black Oak, Missouri

== Other ==
- Black Oak Arkansas, American band
  - Black Oak Arkansas (album)
- Blackoak (song), a 2023 single by English electronics duo Maribou State
- Black Oak (band), Dutch band
- Black Oak Heritage Park, part of Ojibway Prairie Complex in Windsor, Ontario, Canada
- Blackoak Font, a common typeface
