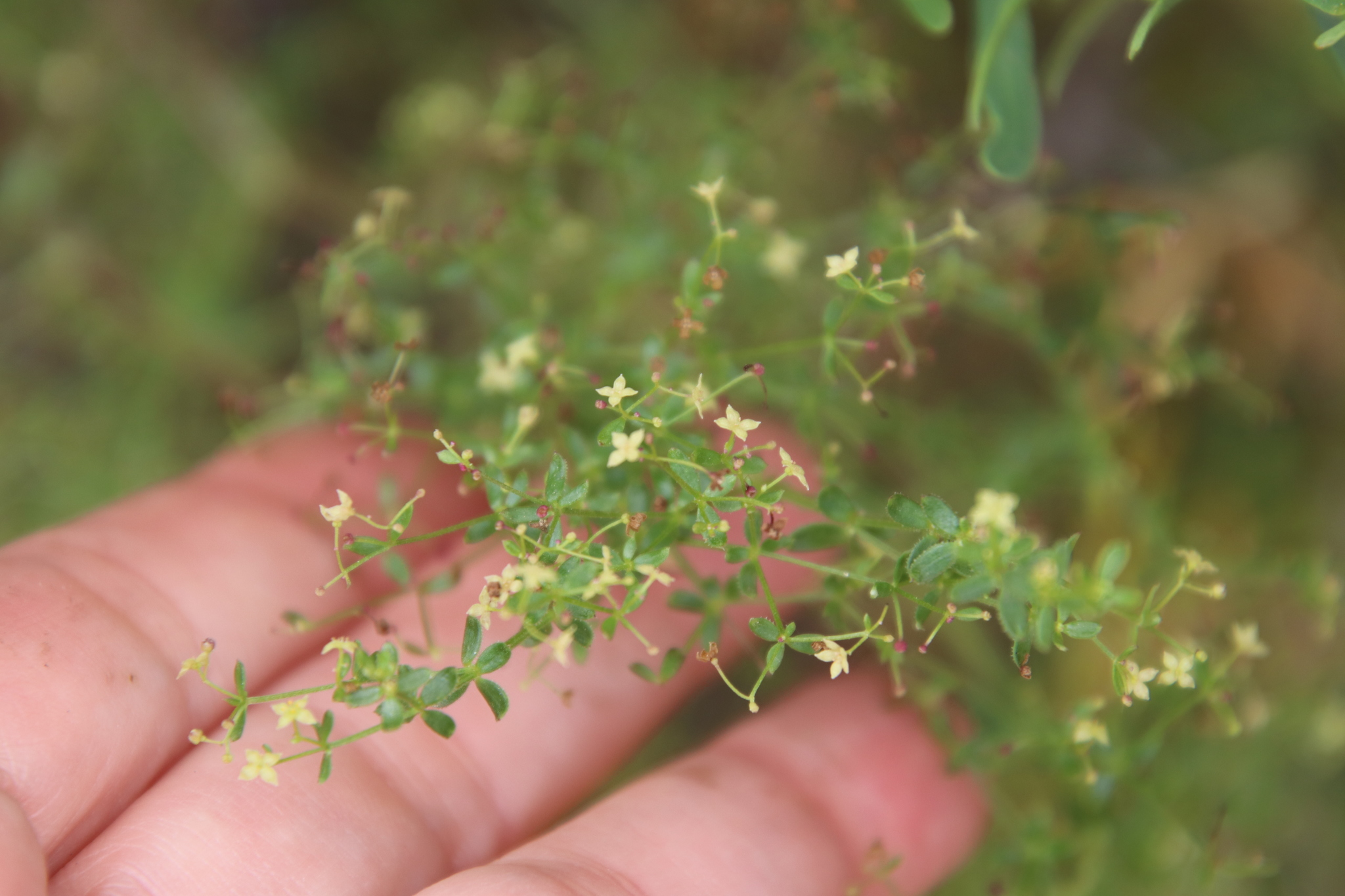

Scientific classification
- Kingdom: Plantae
- Clade: Tracheophytes
- Clade: Angiosperms
- Clade: Eudicots
- Clade: Asterids
- Order: Gentianales
- Family: Rubiaceae
- Genus: Galium
- Species: G. porrigens

Binomial name
- Galium porrigens Dempster

Synonyms
- Galium nuttallii var. ovalifolium Dempster 1958, not G. ovalifolium Schott f. ex Schult. 1827; Galium nuttallii subsp. ovalifolium (Dempster) Dempster & Stebbins

= Galium porrigens =

Species of plant

Galium porrigens is a species of flowering plant in the coffee family known by the common names graceful bedstraw and climbing bedstraw. It is native to the west coast of North America from Oregon to Baja California.

Galium porrigens can be found in many habitats from forest to coastal shrubland, and is often a member of the chaparral plant community. This is a small, woody perennial herb with climbing stems. It is covered in tiny prickly hairs which help it climb and hang. Leaves are arranged in whorls of four about the thin stems. The tiny leaves are oval-shaped, pointed, and green, often with red or purple tips and edges. The plant is dioecious, with male plants producing clusters of staminate flowers and female individuals producing solitary flowers at the leaf axils. Both types of flower are yellowish to reddish. The fruit is a berry.

== Varieties ==
Two varieties are recognized as of May 2014:

- Galium porrigens var. porrigens - Oregon, California, Baja California
- Galium porrigens var. tenue (Dempster) Dempster - Oregon, California
