= California chaparral and woodlands =

Ecoregion in the western United States and Mexico

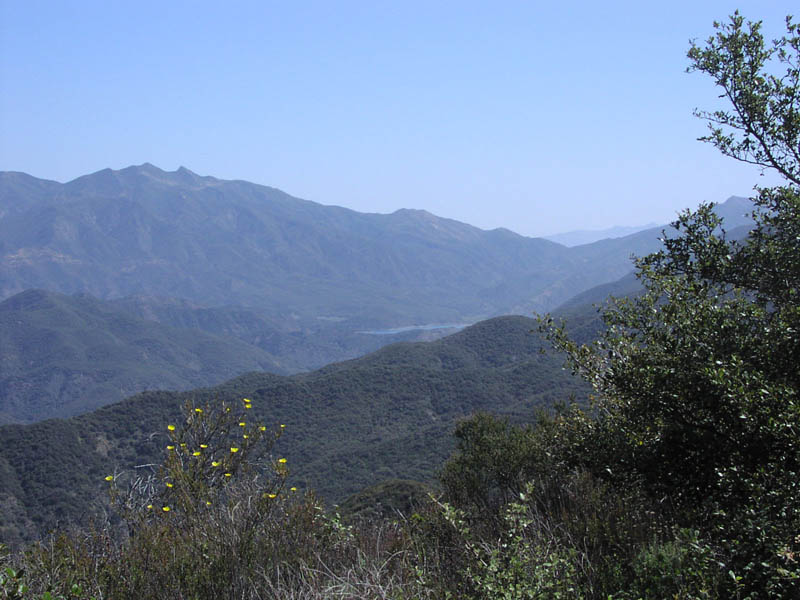

Ecology
- Realm: Nearctic
- Biome: Mediterranean forests, woodlands, and scrub

Geography
- Area: 121,000 km^{2} (47,000 mi^{2})
- Countries: United States; Mexico
- States: Oregon; California; Baja California
- Climate type: Mediterranean (Csb)

The California chaparral and woodlands is a terrestrial ecoregion of southwestern Oregon, northern, central, and southern California (United States) and northwestern Baja California (Mexico), located on the west coast of North America. It is an ecoregion of the Mediterranean forests, woodlands, and scrub biome, and part of the Nearctic realm. The valleys of this ecoregion are home to foothill pine, oak species such as blue oak and scrub oak, and chaparral species such as California buckeye. The climate of this ecoregion is Mediterranean, with moderate temperatures throughout the year near the coast and a wetter environment more inland towards the Sierra Nevada. Fires are a natural disaster associated with this ecoregion, and a myriad of flower species, such as the California poppy (California’s state flower), germinate after a fire leaves behind charred wood and smoke. Fires usually occur in intervals of 30-150 years, but this interval has decreased due to anthropogenic activity, creating more fires than this ecoregion can handle.

== Setting ==
=== Three sub-ecoregions ===
The California chaparral and woodlands ecoregion is subdivided into three smaller ecoregions.

- California coastal sage and chaparral ecoregion: In southern coastal California and northwestern coastal Baja California, as well as all the Channel Islands of California and Guadalupe Island.
- California montane chaparral and woodlands: In southern and central coast adjacent and inland California, covering some of the mountains of: the Coast Ranges; the Transverse Ranges; and the western slopes of the northern Peninsular Ranges.
- California interior chaparral and woodlands: In central interior California surrounding the California Central Valley cover the foothills and the Transverse Ranges and Sierra Nevada.

=== Locations ===
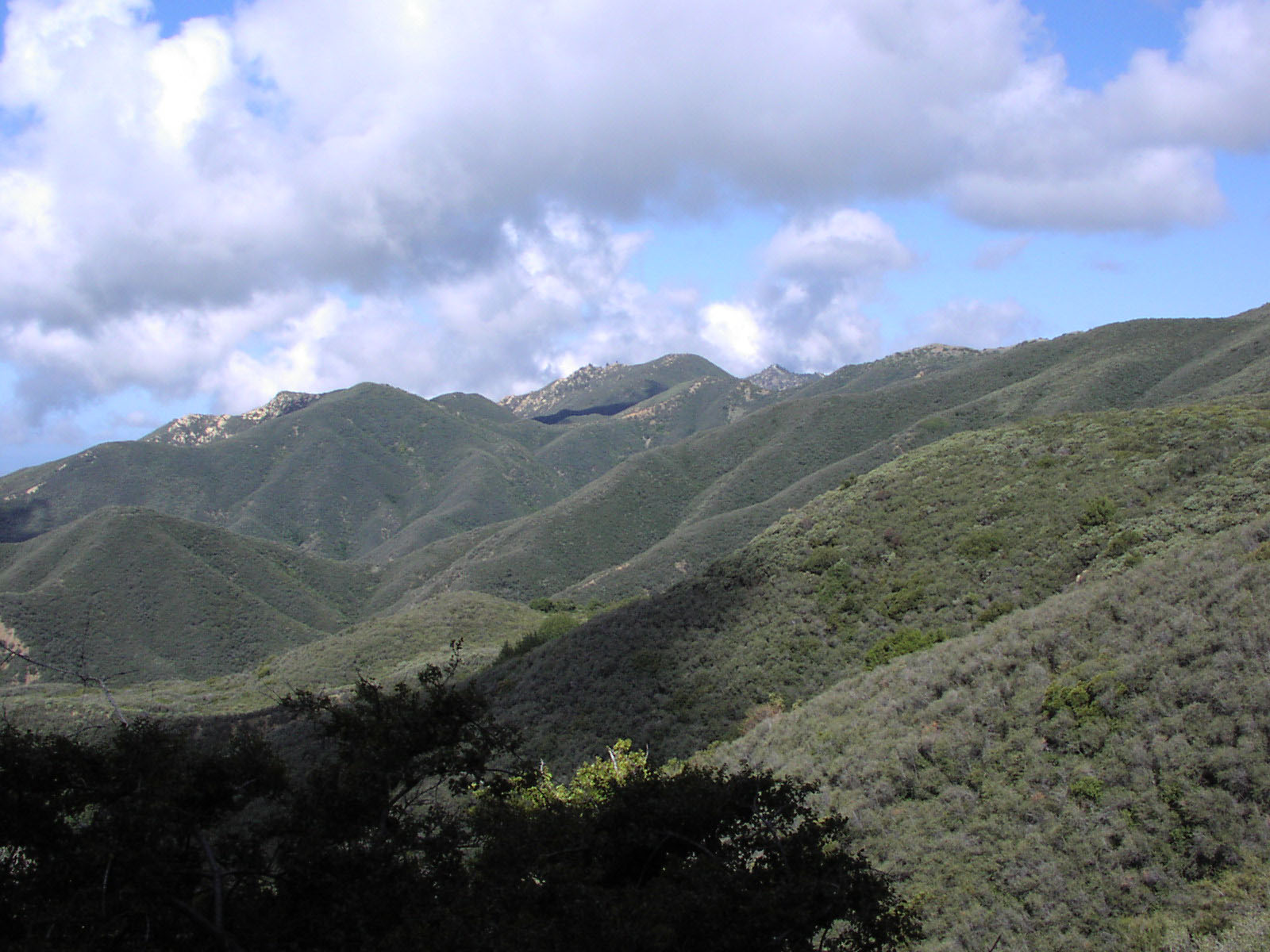
Montane chaparral and woodlands in the Santa Ynez Mountains, near Santa Barbara, California

Most of the population of California and Baja California lives in these ecoregions, which includes the San Francisco Bay Area, Ventura County, the Greater Los Angeles Area, San Diego County, Tijuana, and Ensenada, Baja California.

The California Central Valley grasslands ecoregion, as well as the coniferous Sierra Nevada forests, Northern California coastal forests, and Klamath-Siskiyou forests of northern California and southwestern Oregon, share many plant and animal affinities with the California chaparral and woodlands. Many botanists consider the California chaparral and woodlands, Sierra Nevada forests, Klamath-Siskiyou forests, and Northern California coastal forests as a single California Floristic Province, excluding the deserts of eastern California, which belong to other floristic provinces. Many Bioregionalists, including poet Gary Snyder, identify the central and northern Coast Ranges, Klamath-Siskiyou, the Central Valley, and Sierra Nevada as the Shasta Bioregion or the Alta California Bioregion.

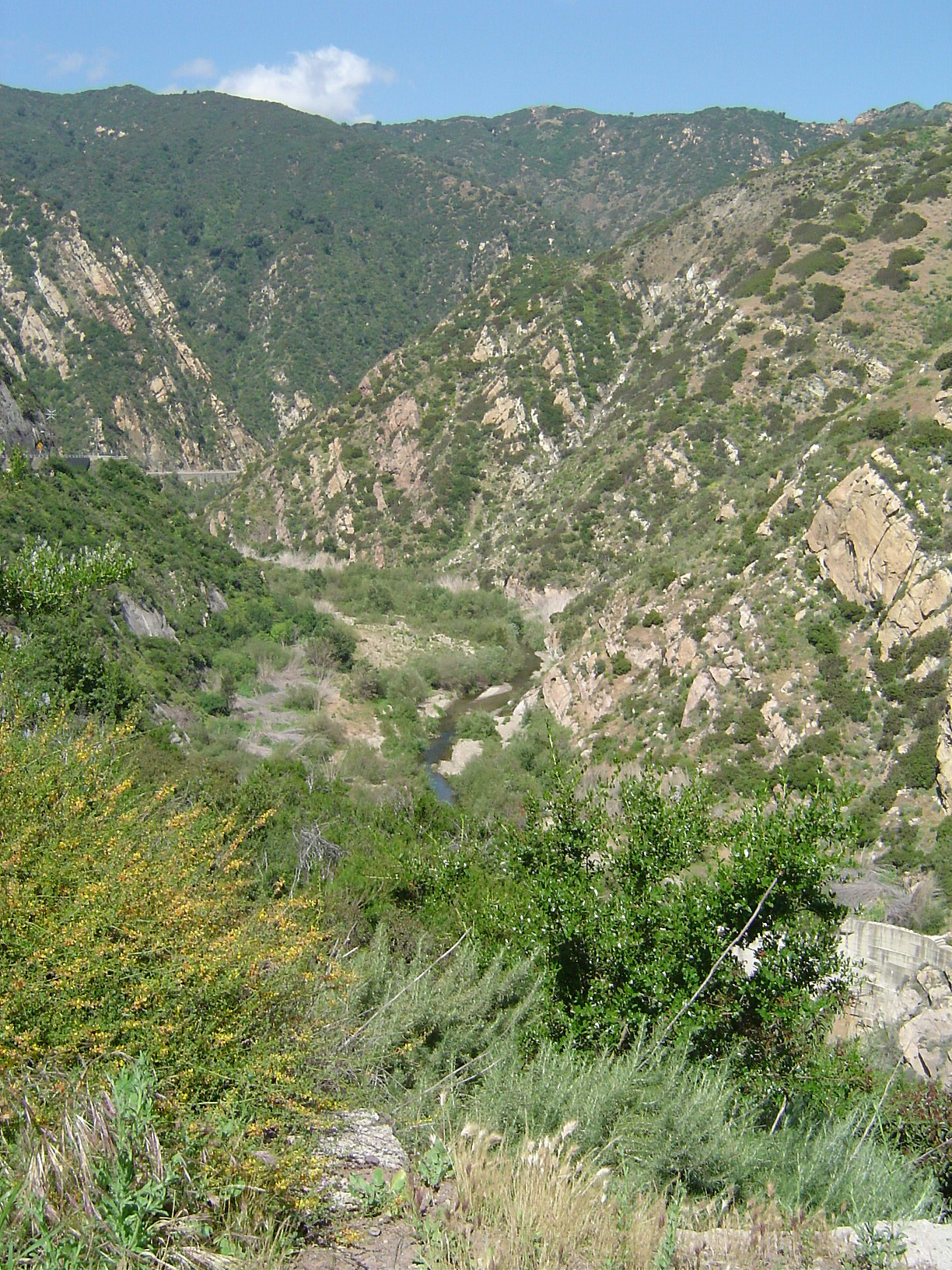
Southern coastal sage and chaparral in the Santa Monica Mountains, near Malibu.

== Flora ==
The ecoregion includes a great variety of plant communities, including grasslands, oak savannas and woodlands, chaparral, and coniferous forests, including southern stands of the tall coast redwood (Sequoia sempervirens). The flora of this ecoregion also includes tree species such as gray or foothill pine (Pinus sabiniana), scrub oak (Quercus dumosa), California buckeye (Aesculus californica), the rare Gowen cypress (Cupressus goveniana), the rare Monterey cypress (Cupressus macrocarpa), and a wealth of endemic plant species, including the extremely rare San Gabriel Mountain liveforever (Dudleya densiflora), Catalina mahogany (Cercocarpus traskiae), and the threatened most beautiful jewel-flower (Streptanthus albidus ssp. Peramoenus). Hesperoyucca whipplei, colloquially known as Chaparral Yucca, is commonplace throughout the lower elevations of the climate zone.

There are two types of chaparral: soft and hard chaparral. Hard chaparral is usually evergreen, located at higher elevation and is harder to walk through. Soft chaparral tends to be drought deciduous, live at lower elevations and tends to be easier to walk through. Some chaparral shrubs recover post-fire by resprouting from the roots that outlast the fire whereas others regenerate seeds from dormant seed banks.

Established resprouting shrubs use deep roots that can access consistent water sources during their drought and can recover faster afterward.

== Fauna ==
Species include the California gnatcatcher (Polioptila californica), Costa's hummingbird (Calypte costae), coast horned lizard (Phrynosoma coronatum), and rosy boa (Lichanura trivirgata). Other animals found here are the Heermann kangaroo rat (Dipodomys heermanni), Santa Cruz kangaroo rat (Dipodomys venustus), and the endangered white-eared pocket mouse (Perognathus alticolus).

A notable insect resident of this ecoregion is the rain beetle (Pleocoma sp.) It spends up to several years living underground in a larval stage and emerges only during wet-season rains to mate. Another insect found in the chaparral is the ceanothus silk moth (Hyalophora euryalus). It has a distinct pattern of reddish-brown with white spots and is found all along the west coast of the United States as well as Baja California.

== Fire ==
Chaparral, like most Mediterranean shrublands, is highly fire resilient and historically burned with high-severity, stand replacing events every 30 to 100 years. Recovery works via seed resprouting and germination, varying by species. Historically, Native Americans burned chaparral to promote grasslands for textiles and food. Though adapted to infrequent fires, chaparral plant communities can be exterminated by frequent fires especially with climate change induced drought. A drought after a fire can reduce the chance of success of chaparral recovery as it makes it more likely that new shrubs would die before full recovery. Short time in between fires may result in shrubs failing to fully recover. Species that rely on stored seeds are at most risk as they could be burned again before having the ability to reproduce. Repeated fires can also deplete the energy reserves of species that resprout. Today, frequent accidental ignitions can convert chaparral from a native shrubland to nonnative annual grassland and drastically reduce species diversity, especially under global-change-type drought. Historically, the time in between fires varies on the chaparral types as some take 30-90 years such as the chamise redshank and others take 15-50 years such as the montane chaparral.

== Human influence ==
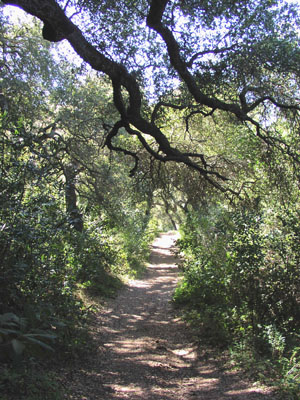
California oak woodlands, in Gaviota State Park, near Santa Barbara, California

The region has been heavily affected by grazing, logging, dams, and water diversions, intensive agriculture and urbanization, as well as competition by numerous introduced or exotic plant and animal species. Even before European settlement, Native Americans burned the land to suit their needs, and some unique plant communities, like southern California's Coastal Sage Scrub, have been nearly eradicated by agriculture and urbanization. Agricultural and urban development have converted areas of Coastal Sage Scrub, which as a result, reduced the habitat for many species in the area. As a result, the region now has many rare and endangered species, e.g., coastal California gnatcatcher, El Segundo blue butterfly, Palos Verdes blue butterfly, all of which are endemic to Southern California scrub communities.

The effects of global warming on this ecoregion may be hard to predict, as it has already evolved to handle extreme weather events such as high winds and more frequent fires. However, some experts suggest that climate change can lead to a loss of vegetation and biodiversity as well as an increase in wildfires, specifically the possibility of larger fires and a longer fire season overall.

== See also ==
- California Chaparral Institute
- California coastal prairie
- California montane chaparral
- Chaparral
- Closed-cone pine forest
- Coast Redwood forest
- Coastal sage scrub
- Mixed evergreen forest
- Northern coastal scrub
- Oak woodland
- Sierra Nevada lower montane forest
