= John C. Frémont botanical nomenclature eponyms =

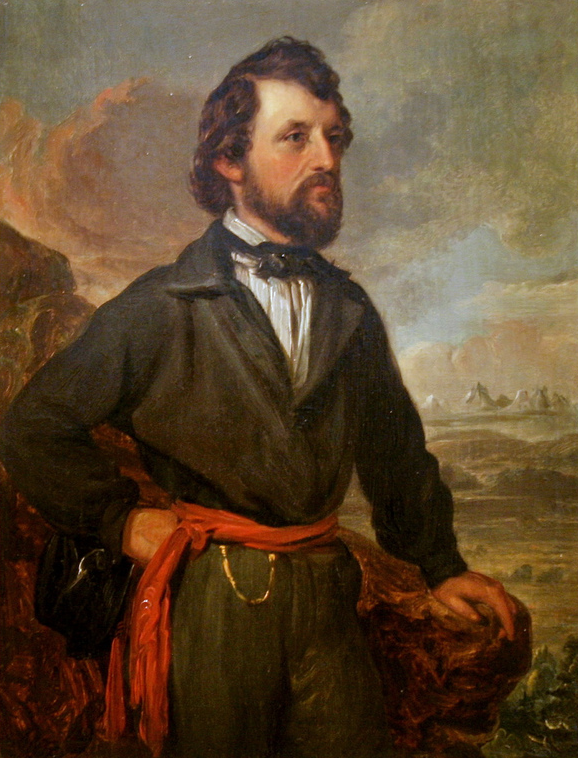
John C. Frémont

John C. Frémont (1813–1890) was an American explorer of the West during the 1840s and 1850s, popularly known as the Pathfinder, while serving in the U.S. military and as a private citizen. His first two published federal expeditions launched a mass emigration into the American West producing maps and reliable reports for settlers to read and follow. In the process of botanical nomenclature (plant naming), Frémont received many eponyms in his honor and for his work as a botanist. His genus name eponym is Fremontodendron, while his species eponym is fremontii. Frémont went on a total of five expeditions; the first three were federally sponsored while Frémont served as a military officer. On these expeditions he was guided by mountain man Kit Carson. Frémont's fourth and fifth expeditions were privately sponsored. Although Frémont's life was controversial, he was considered an American hero. Frémont's published works, co-authored by his wife Jessie, could either be read scientifically or as adventure stories, capturing the public's attention, and creating enthusiasm for Westward migration.

== Scientific background, training, and education ==
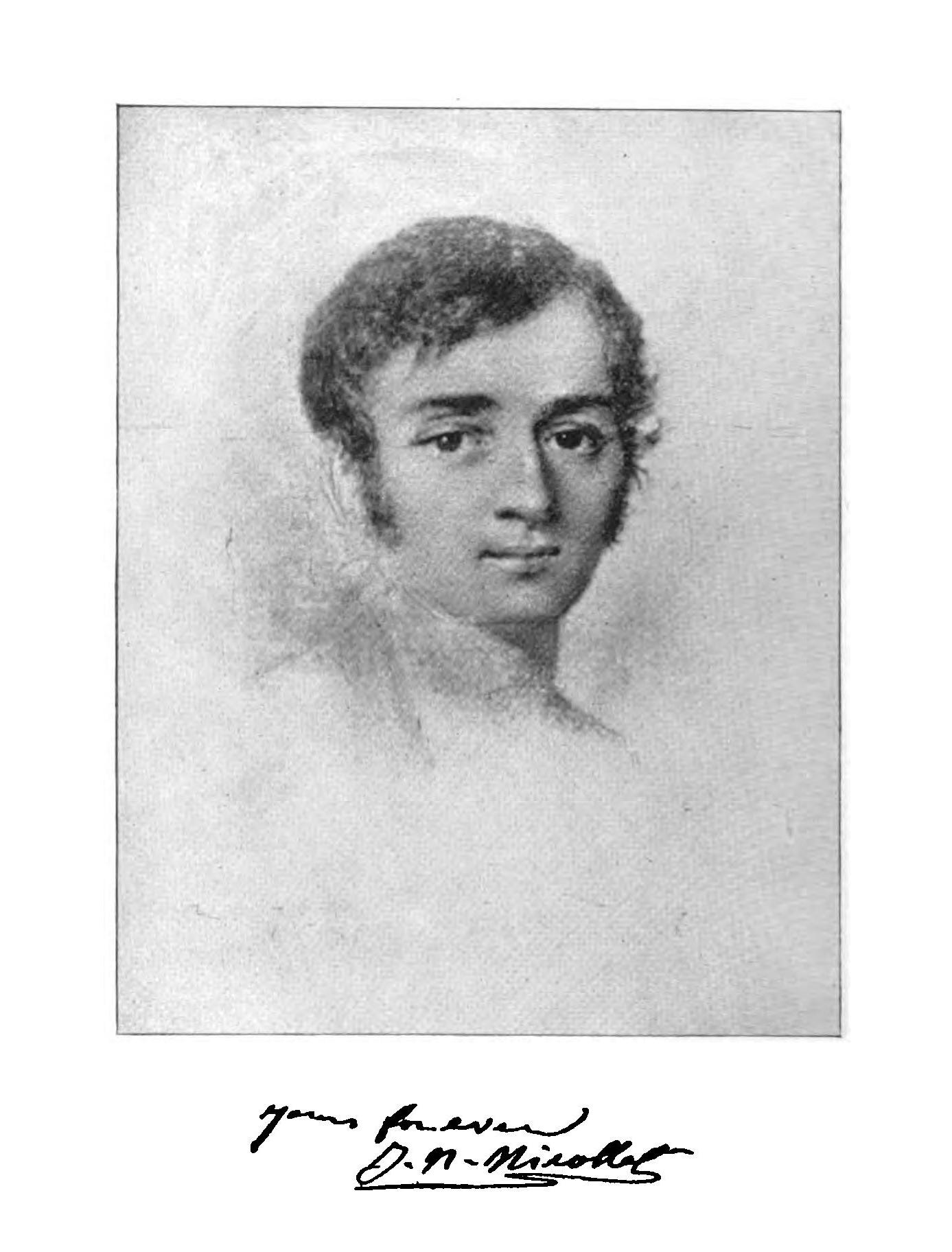
Frémont was scientifically trained under explorer and scientist Joseph Nicollet.

In May 1829, Frémont entered Charleston College, where he studied, and taught at intervals in the countryside. Frémont, however, was expelled from the college for irregular attendance in 1831. Although Frémont did not graduate, he had been grounded in mathematics and natural sciences. After his college dismissal, eminent South Carolina politician Joel R. Poinsett came to Frémont's aid, who secured him an appointment as a teacher of mathematics aboard the sloop USS Natchez. Aided by Poinsett, Frémont was appointed to the U.S. Topographical Corps, surveying a route for the Charleston, Louisville, and Cincinnati railroad. When Poinsett became Secretary of War, he arranged for Frémont to assist notable French explorer and scientist Joseph Nicollet in exploring the lands between the Mississippi and Missouri rivers. In July 1838, Frémont was appointed second lieutenant in the U.S. Army Corps of Topographical Engineers, accompanying Nicollet on two successive expeditions, ending in 1839. Frémont gained valuable wilderness experience under Nicollet becoming a first rate topographer, trained in describing fauna, flora, soil, water resources, astronomy, and geological observation.

== Plant eponyms ==
Frémont collected a number of plants on his expeditions, including the first recorded discovery of the single-leaf pinyon by a European American. The genus (Fremontodendron) of the California flannelbush (Fremontodendron californicum) is named for him, as are the species names of some 20 other plants.

Plants named for Fremont:

- barberry (Berberis fremontii)
- Western rosinweed (Calycadenia fremontii)
- pincushion flower (Chaenactis fremontii)
- goosefoot (Chenopodium fremontii)
- Fremont's leatherflower (Clematis fremontii)
- California flannelbush (Fremontodendron californicum)
- Mexican flannelbush (Fremontodendron mexicanum)
- silk tassel (Garrya fremontii)
- moss gentian (Gentiana fremontii)
- vernal pool goldfields (Lasthenia fremontii)
- tidytips (Layia fremontii)
- desert pepperweed (Lepidium fremontii)
- desert boxthorn (Lycium fremontii)
- bush mallow (Malacothamnus fremontii)
- monkeyflower (Mimulus fremontii)
- phacelia (Phacelia fremontii)
- desert combleaf (Polyctenium fremontii)
- cottonwood tree (Populus fremontii)
- desert apricot (Prunus fremontii)
- indigo bush (Psorothamnus fremontii)
- mountain ragwort (Senecio fremontii)
- yellowray gold (Syntrichopappus fremontii)
- chaparral death camas (Toxicoscordion fremontii)
- amphipappus (Amphipappus fremontii).

Gallery

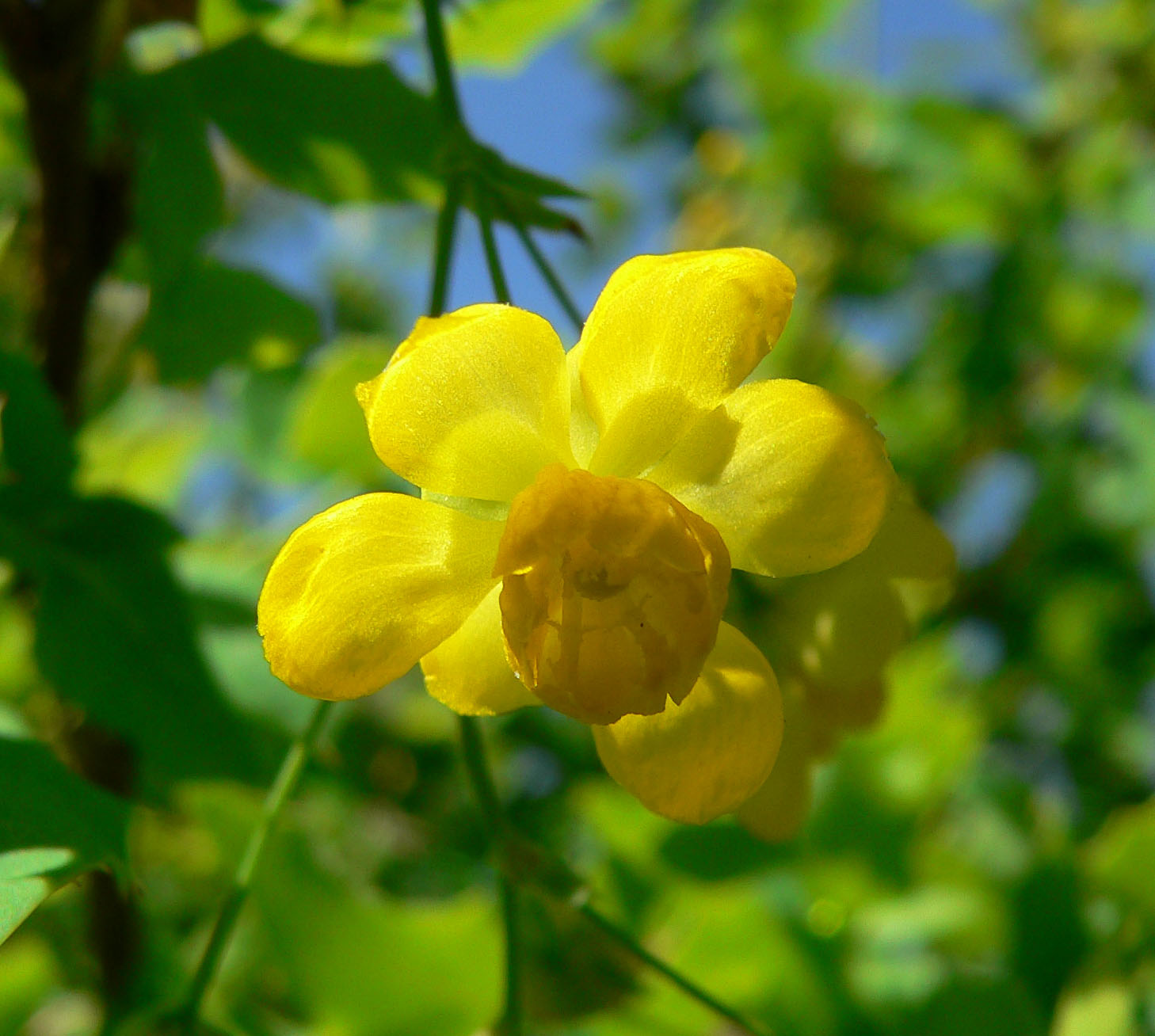
Barberry
Berberis fremontii

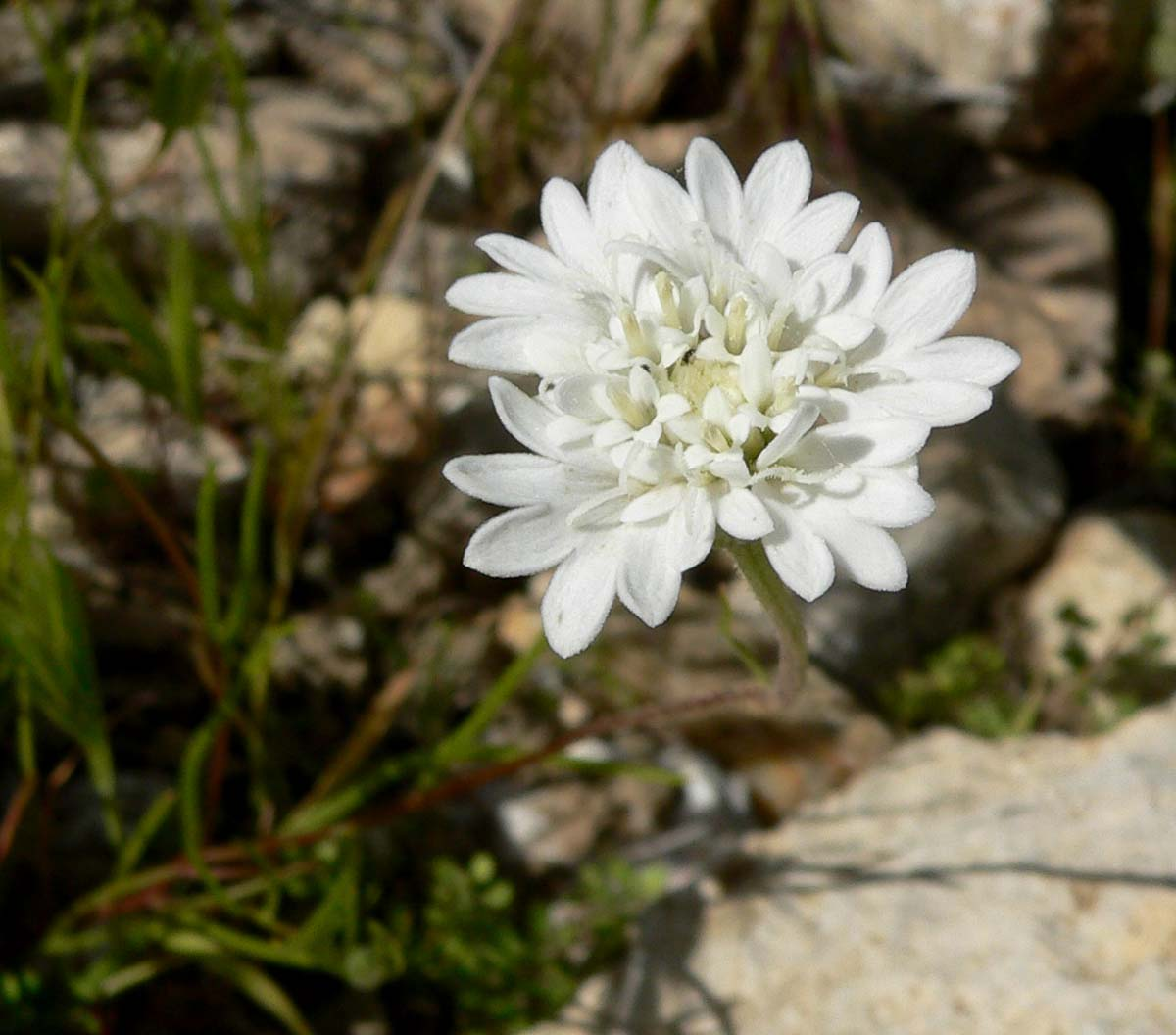
Desert pincushion
Chaenactis fremontii

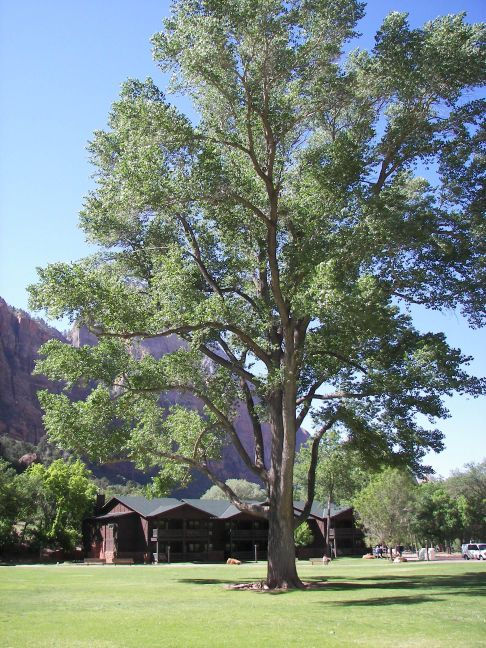
Cottonwood
Populus fremontii

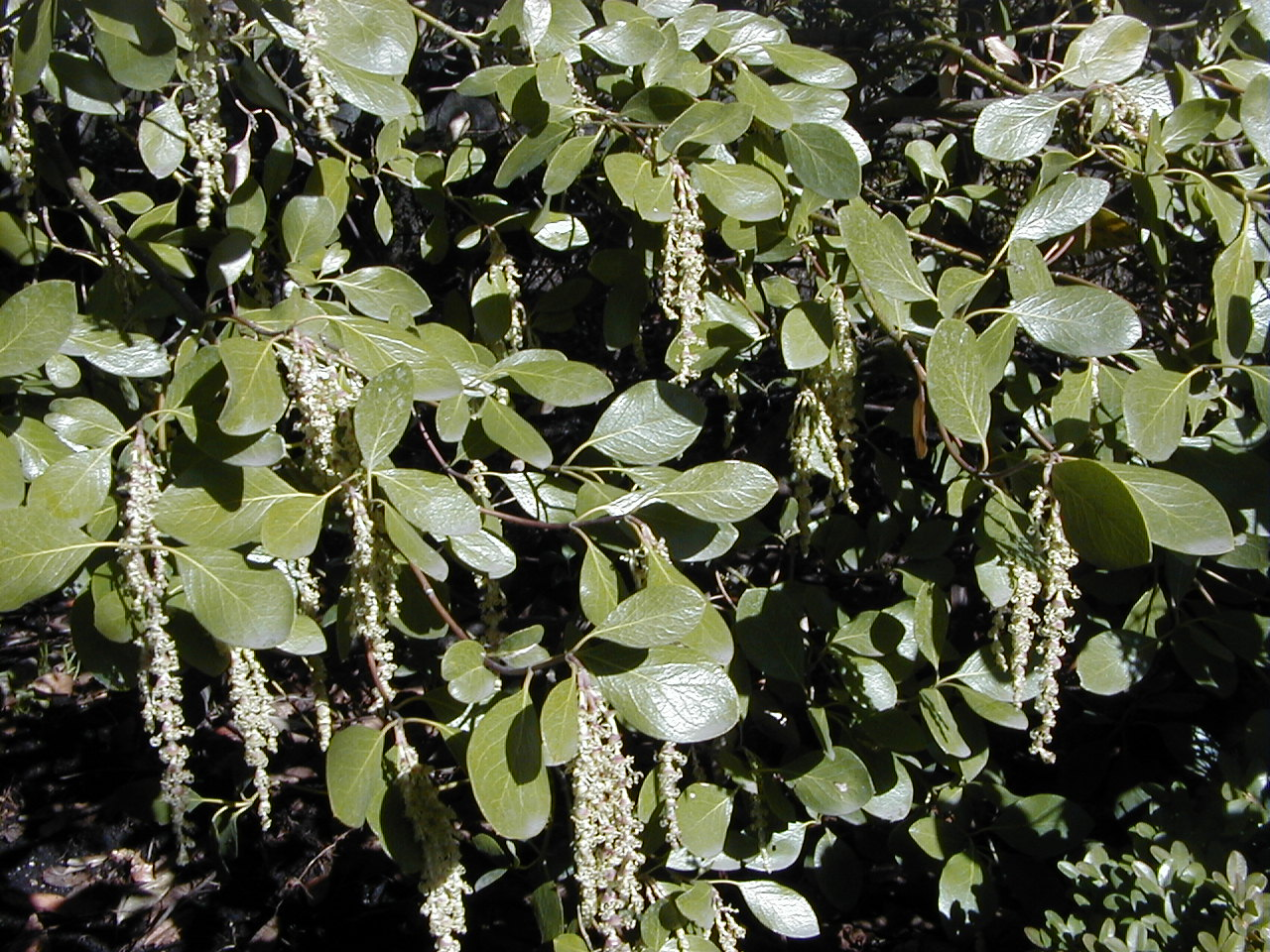
Silk tassel
Garrya fremontii

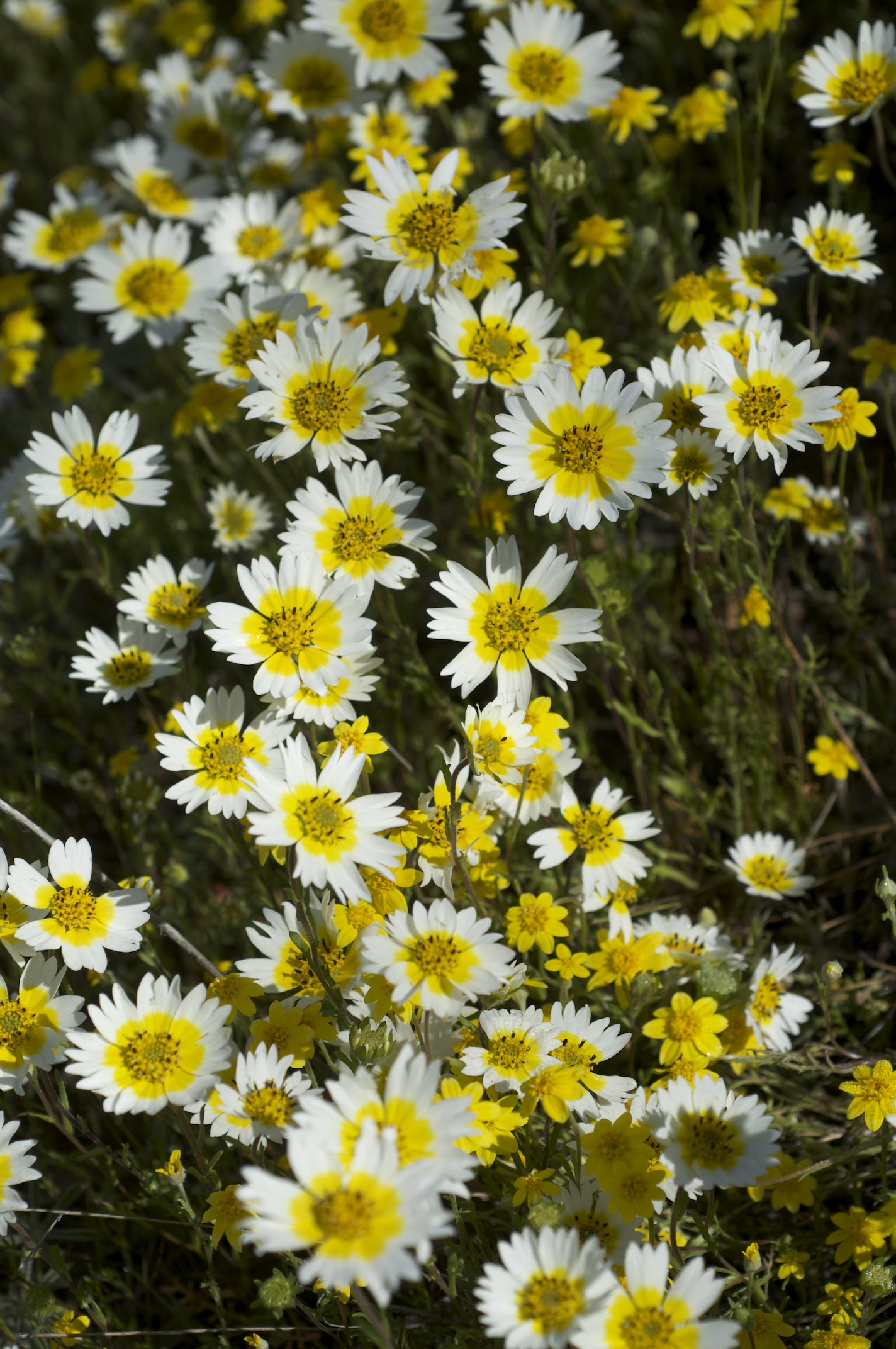
Tidytips
Layia fremontii

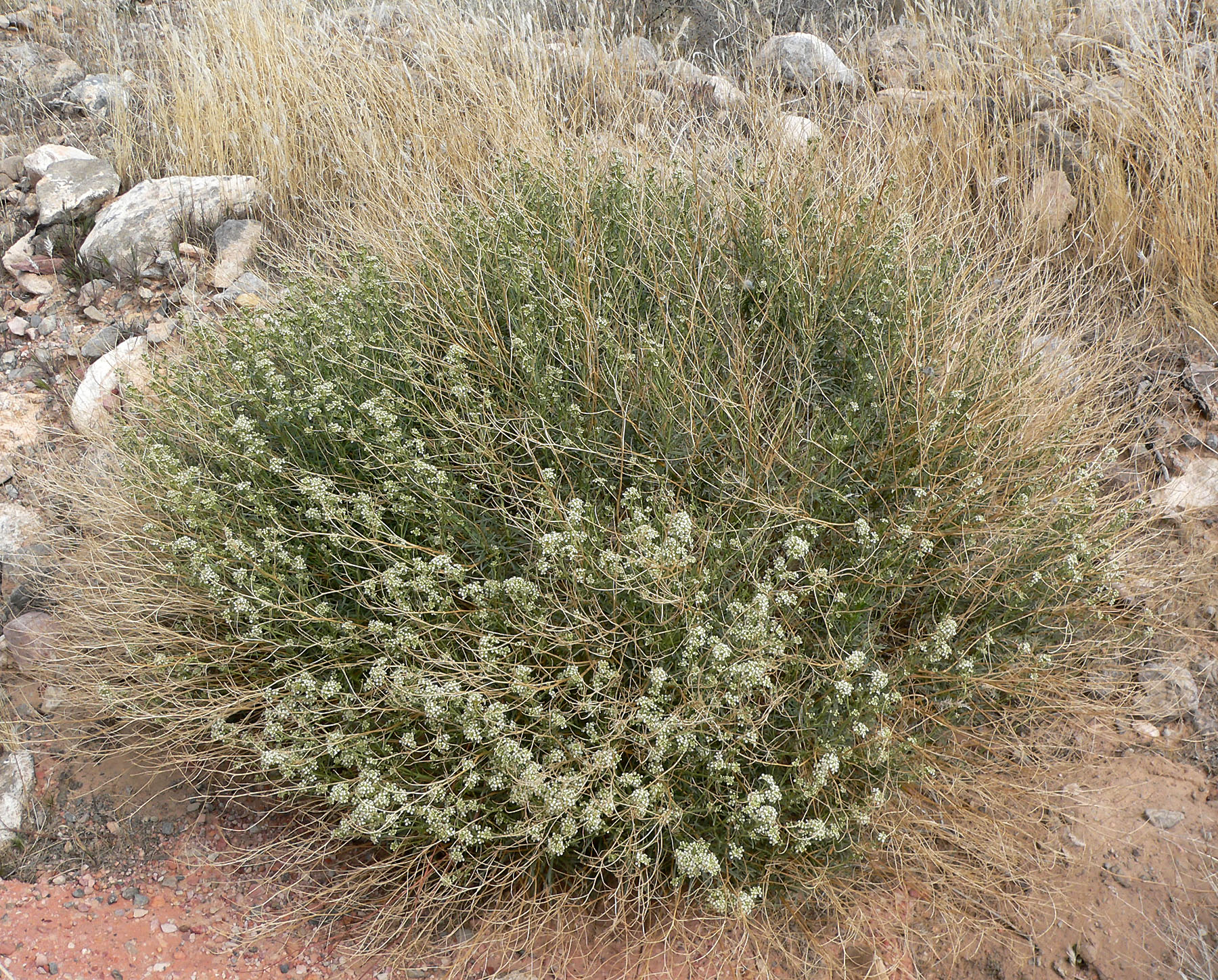
Desert pepperweed
Lepidium fremontii

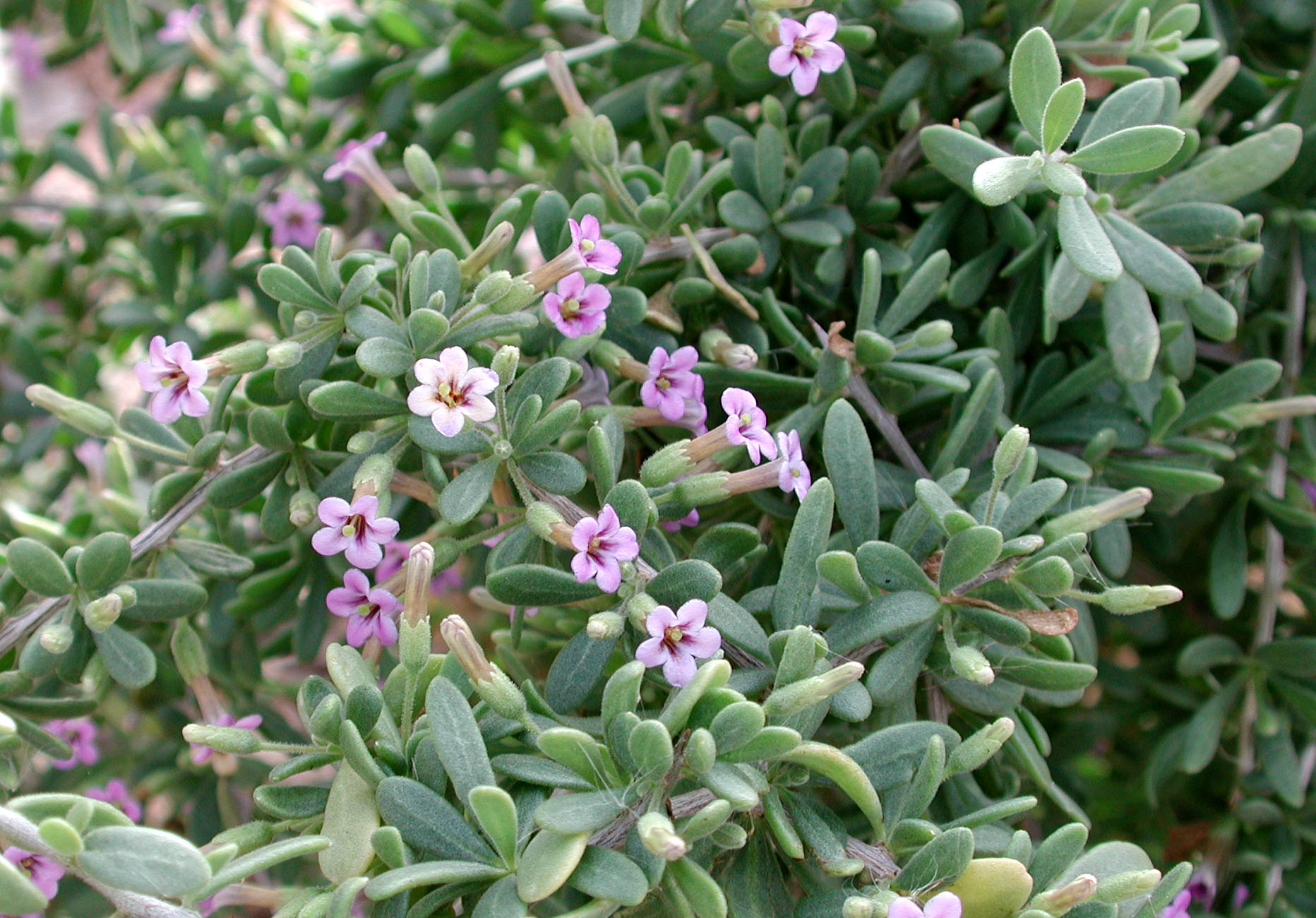
Desert boxthorn
Lycium fremontii

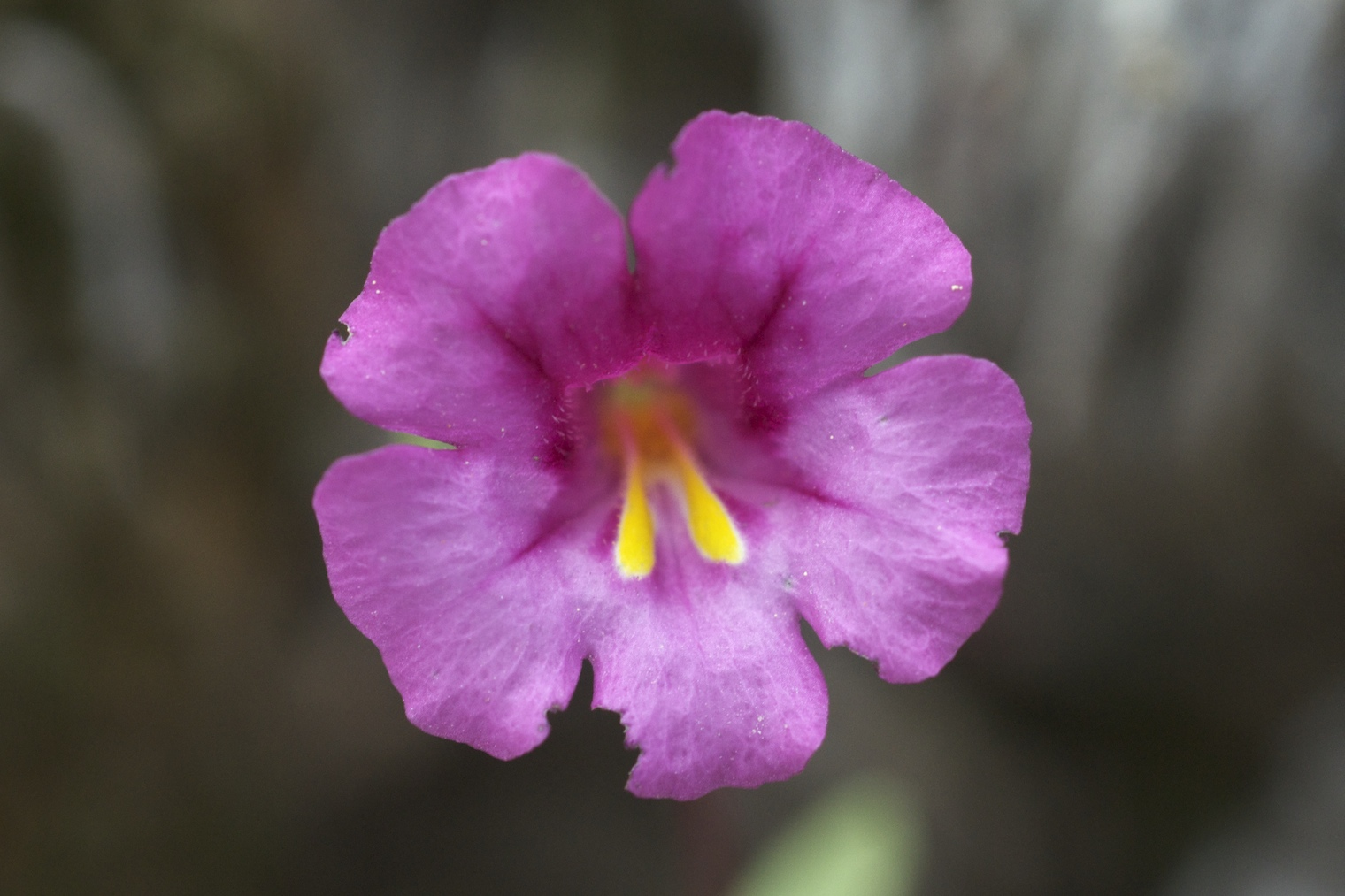
Monkeyflower
Mimulus fremontii

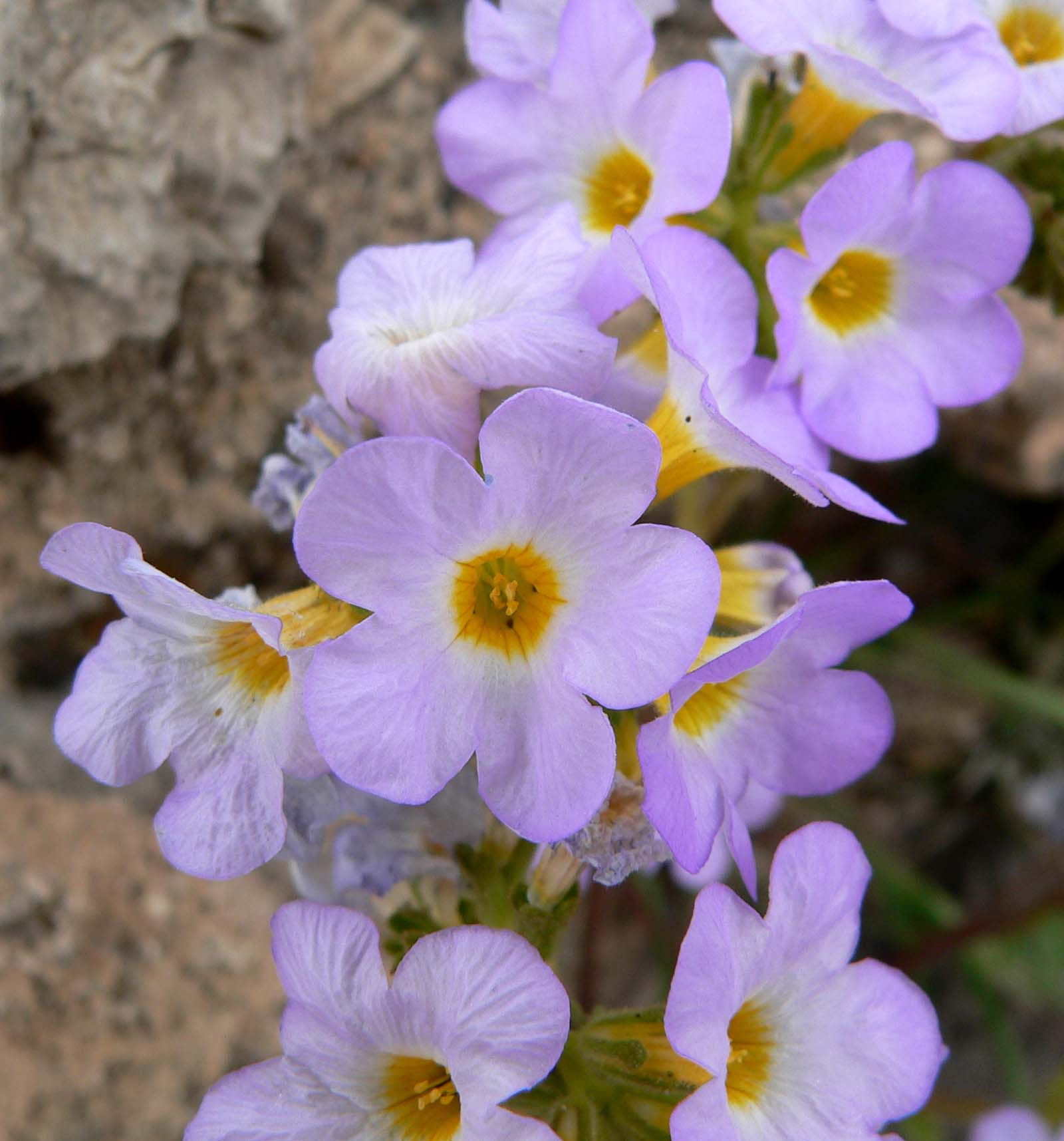
Phacelia
Phacelia fremontii

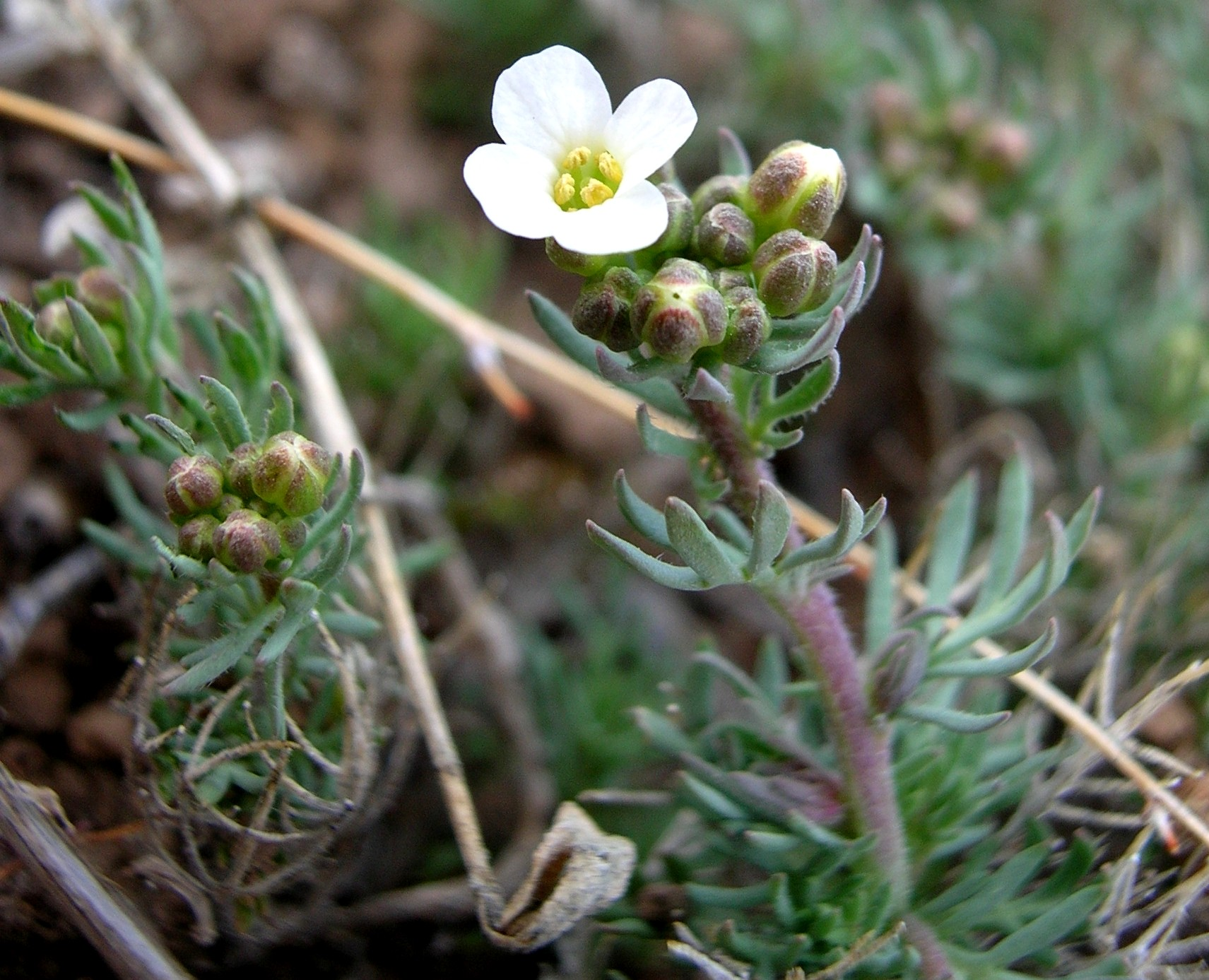
Desert combleaf
Polyctenium fremontii

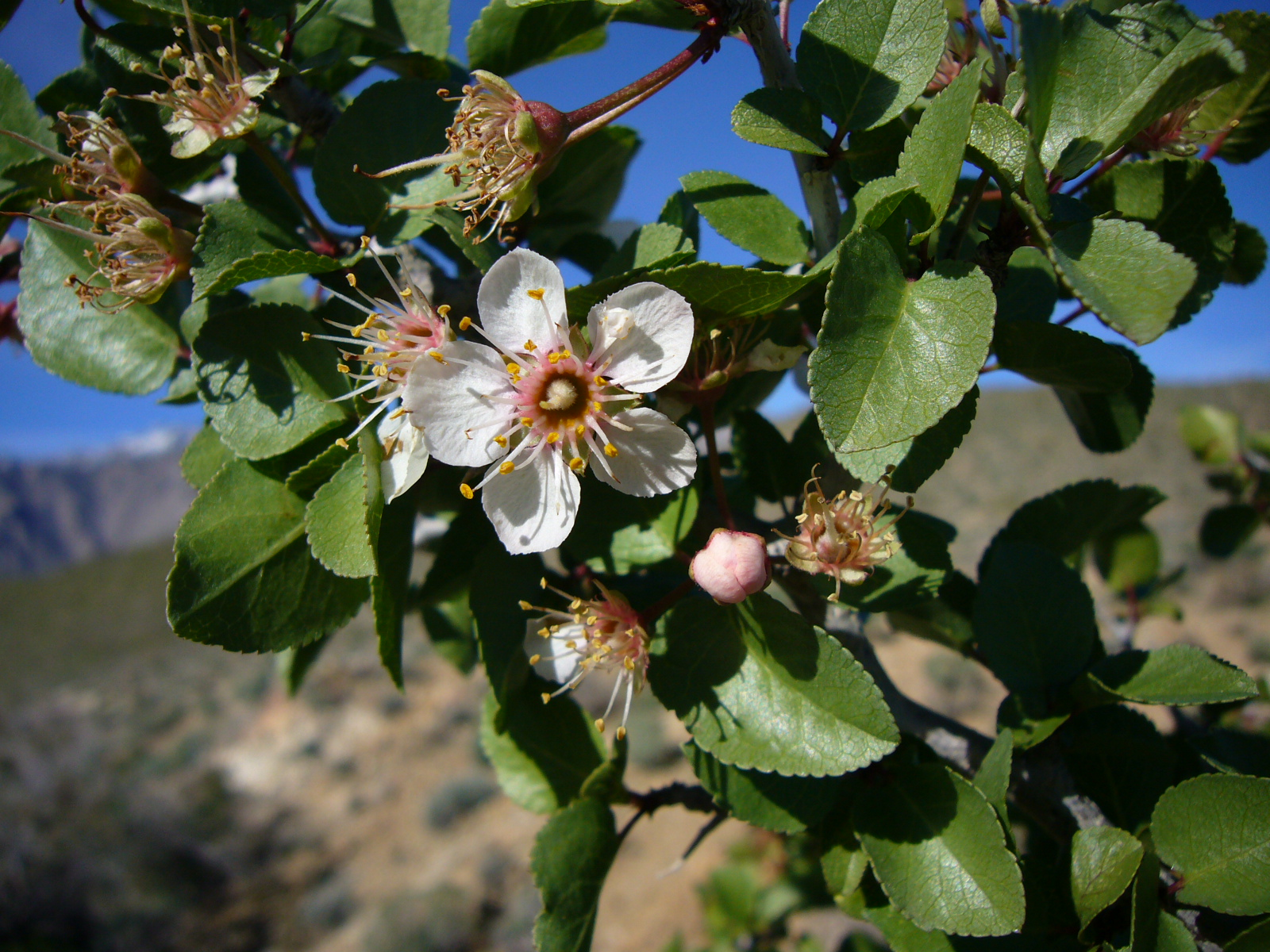
Desert apricot
Prunus fremontii

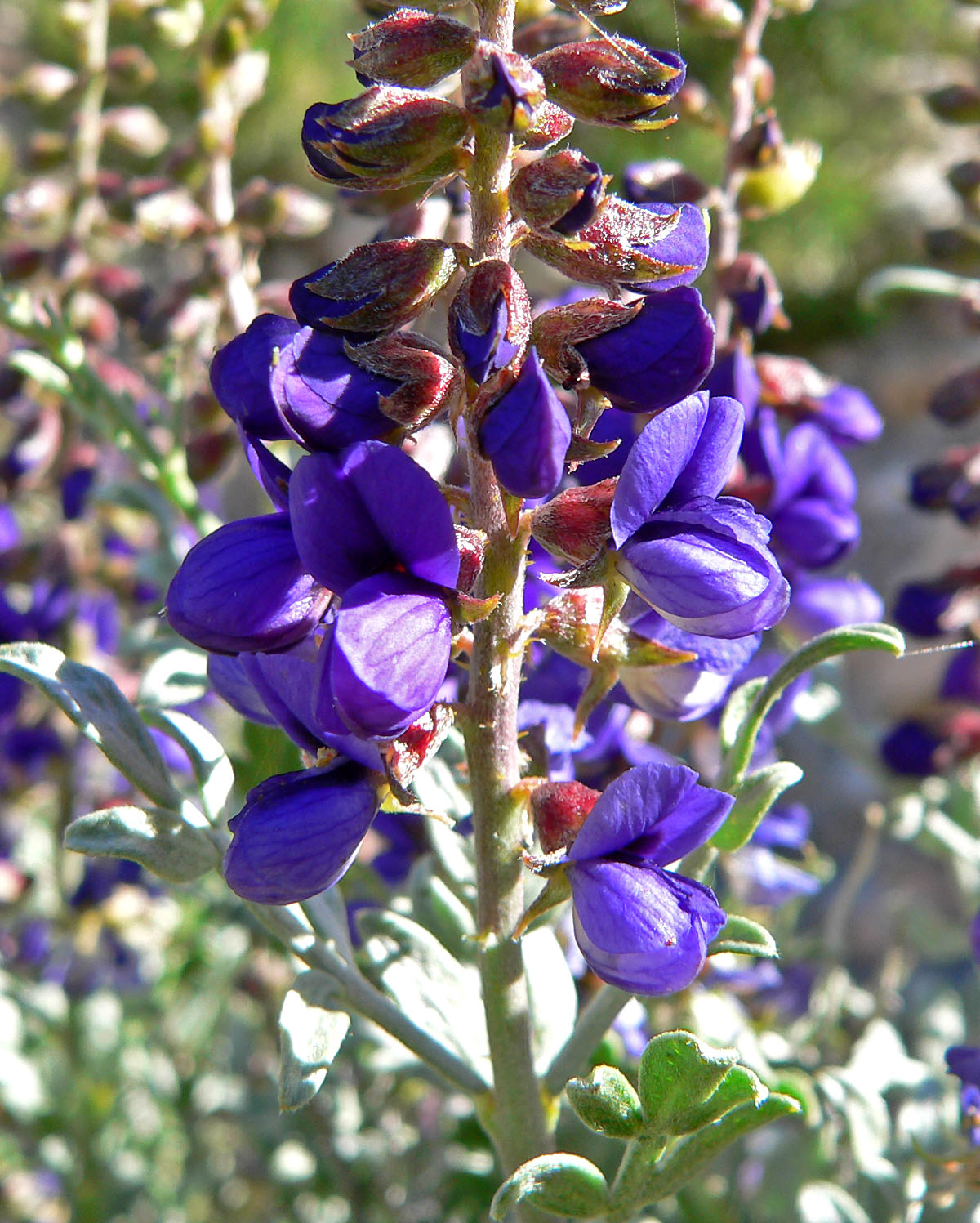
Indigo bush
Psorothamnus fremontii

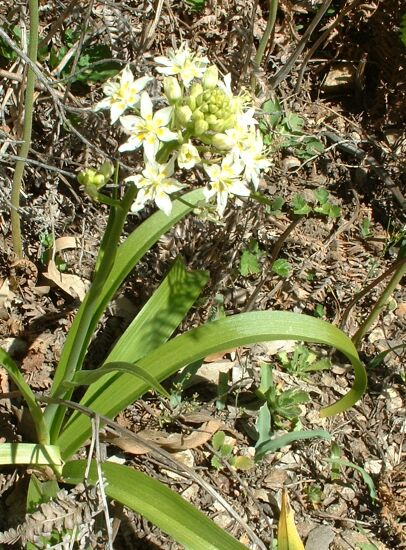
Chaparral death camas
Toxicoscordion fremontii

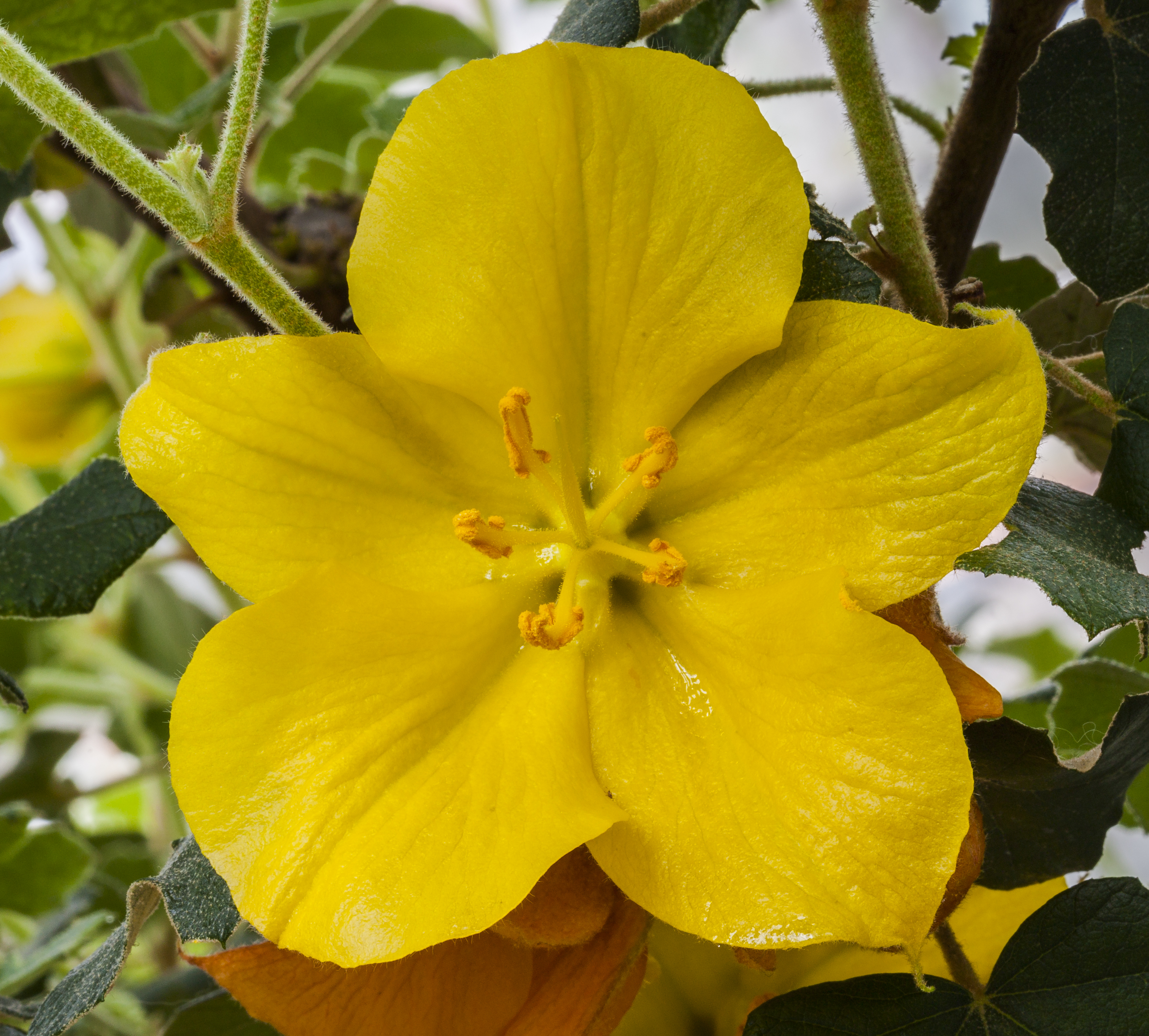
California flannel bush
Fremontodendron californicum

== Sources ==
- Nevins, Allan (1931). Allen Johnson; Dumas Malone (eds.). Dictionary of American Biography Frémont, John Charles. Vol. 7. New York: Charles Scribner's Sons. pp. 19–23.
- McNamara, John (May 31, 2016). "John C. Frémont Called "The Pathfinder," His Expeditions and Writings Inspired Americans". ThoughtCo.
- Richards, Leonard L. (2007). The California Gold Rush and the Coming of the Civil War. New York, New York: Vintage Books Random House Inc. ISBN 978-0307277572.
- The Exploring Expedition to the Rocky Mountains in the Year 1842, and to Oregon and North California in the years 1843–'44. Washington: Gales and Seaton. 1845.
- The Exploring Expedition to the Rocky Mountains, Oregon and California, to Which is Added A Description of the Physical Geography of California. With Recent Notices of the Gold Region from the Latest and Most Authentic Sources. Buffalo: Derby Orton & Mulligan. 1853.
- The Life of Col. John Charles Fremont and His Narrative of Explorations and Adventures in Kansas, Nebraska, Oregon and California. New York and Auburn: Miller, Orton & Mulligan. 1856.
