= Fremont =

Fremont (Frémont) may refer to:

== Places ==
In the United States:

- Fremont, California – the largest city with the name
  - Fremont station
  - Fremont station (BART)
- Fremont Landing, California, also known as Fremont, in Yolo County
- Fremont Center, Illinois
- Fremont, Indiana
- Fremont, Iowa
- Fremont, Michigan
- Fremont, Missouri
- Fremont, Nebraska
- Fremont, New Hampshire
- Fremont, Steuben County, New York
- Fremont, Sullivan County, New York
- Fremont, North Carolina
- Fremont, Ohio
- Fremont, Utah
- Fremont, Virginia
- Fremont, Seattle, Washington
- Fremont, Wisconsin, village in Waupaca County
- Fremont, Clark County, Wisconsin, town
- Fremont, Waupaca County, Wisconsin, town

== People ==
- John C. Frémont (1813–1890), American explorer, U. S. Army officer, and politician
- Fremont (name), a surname and given name

== Other uses ==
- Fremont culture, an archaeological Native American culture
- Fremont Hotel and Casino, a hotel/casino on Fremont Street in downtown Las Vegas, Nevada
  - Fremont Street, a tourist attraction in downtown Las Vegas that spans between the Las Vegas Boulevard and Main Street
- Fremont Point transmitting station, a transmitter in Jersey
- Fremont River (Utah), a tributary of the Colorado River
- The Fremont Troll, a statue in Seattle, Washington
- Fremont Unified School District, Fremont, California
- Fremont (film), a 2023 drama film
- "Fremont," codename for a Microsoft project in classified advertising
- Fiat Freemont, a crossover SUV sold in Europe as a rebadged Dodge Journey after the 2011 model year
- John C. Frémont botanical nomenclature eponyms, such as:
  - Populus fremontii, Fremont cottonwood, a type of tree found in the Southwest U.S. and northern Mexico
  - A genus called Fremontodendron

== See also ==
- Frémont (disambiguation)
- Fremont Bridge (disambiguation)
- Fremont County (disambiguation)
- Fremont High School (disambiguation)
- Fremont Pass (disambiguation)
- Fremont Township (disambiguation)
- John Fremont (disambiguation)
