= Fremont (name) =

Fremont or Frémont is a surname and male given name. Notable people with the name include:

== Surname ==
- Christian Frémont, French préfet
- John C. Frémont (1813-1890), American officer, explorer and politician
- Jessie Benton Frémont (1824–1902), American writer and wife of John C. Frémont
- Ludovico Fremont (born 1982), Italian actor
- Thierry Frémont (born 1962), French actor

== Given name ==
- Fremont C. Chamberlain (1856–1931), member of the Michigan House of Representatives
- Fremont Cole (1856–1915), American lawyer and politician from New York
- Fremont Older (1856–1935), American newspaper editor
- Fremont D. Orff, American architect
- Fremont O. Phillips (1856–1936), U.S. Representative from Ohio
- Fremont Rider (1885–1962), American writer, poet, and editor
- Fremont Wood (1856–1940), American attorney and judge from Idaho

== See also ==
- Fremont (disambiguation)
