= Fremont, Wisconsin (disambiguation) =

Fremont, Wisconsin may refer to in the U.S. state of Wisconsin:

- Fremont, Wisconsin, a village
- Fremont, Clark County, Wisconsin, a town
- Fremont, Waupaca County, Wisconsin, a town
