= Fremont micropolitan area =

The Fremont micropolitan area may refer to:

- The Fremont, Nebraska micropolitan area, United States
- The Fremont, Ohio micropolitan area, United States

== See also ==
- Fremont (disambiguation)
