= Fremont Township =

Fremont Township may refer to:

== California ==
- Fremont Township, Santa Clara County, California, in Santa Clara County, California, defunct
- Fremont Township, Solano County, California

== Illinois ==
- Fremont Township, Lake County, Illinois

== Indiana ==
- Fremont Township, Steuben County, Indiana

== Iowa ==
- Fremont Township, Benton County, Iowa
- Fremont Township, Bremer County, Iowa
- Fremont Township, Buchanan County, Iowa
- Fremont Township, Butler County, Iowa
- Fremont Township, Cedar County, Iowa
- Fremont Township, Clarke County, Iowa
- Fremont Township, Fayette County, Iowa
- Fremont Township, Hamilton County, Iowa
- Fremont Township, Johnson County, Iowa
- Fremont Township, Page County, Iowa
- Fremont Township, Winneshiek County, Iowa

== Kansas ==
- Fremont Township, Lyon County, Kansas

== Michigan ==
- Fremont Township, Isabella County, Michigan
- Fremont Township, Saginaw County, Michigan
- Fremont Township, Sanilac County, Michigan
- Fremont Township, Tuscola County, Michigan

== Minnesota ==
- Fremont Township, Winona County, Minnesota
