= John Fremont (disambiguation) =

John C. Frémont was an American soldier, explorer, and presidential candidate.

John Fremont may also refer to:

- John Fremont Burnham
- John Fremont Hill
- John Fremont McCullough
- Various things named after John C. Frémont, such as John C. Fremont High School.
- John C. Frémont also had a son named John C. Frémont Jr.

== See also ==
Fremont (disambiguation)
