= Fremont Pass =

Fremont Pass may refer to:

- Fremont Pass (Colorado), a pass on the Continental Divide of the Americas in Lake County, Colorado, United States
- Fremont Pass (Nevada), a mountain pass in Washoe County, Nevada, United States
- Fremont Pass (Utah), a pass with Fremont Canyon on its western side in Garfield County, Utah, United States
- Newhall Pass, a pass separating the San Gabriel Mountains from the Santa Susana Mountains in California, formerly known as "Fremont Pass"
  - Beale's Cut Stagecoach Pass, the original stagecoach route across the pass

== See also ==
- Fremont (disambiguation)
- List of mountain passes
