= Chili, Wisconsin =

Census-designated place in Wisconsin, United States

- Census-designated place
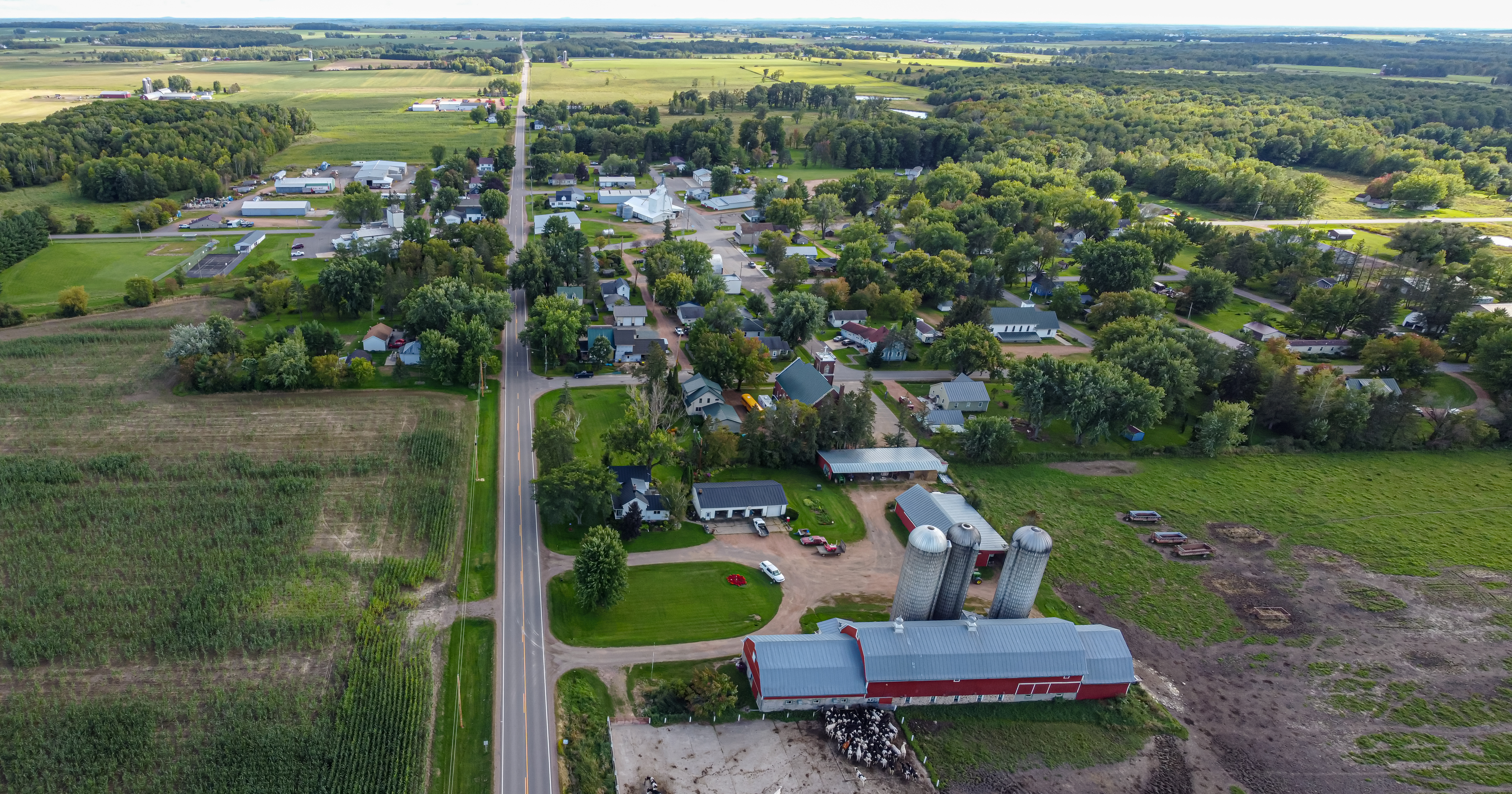
- County Y runs through town

- Location within Wisconsin
- Coordinates: 44°37′37″N 90°21′23″W
- Country: United States
- State: Wisconsin
- County: Clark
- Town: Fremont

Area
  - Total: 1.301 sq mi (3.37 km^{2})
  - Land: 1.287 sq mi (3.33 km^{2})
  - Water: 0.014 sq mi (0.036 km^{2})
- Elevation: 1,234 ft (376 m)

Population (2010)
  - Total: 226
  - Density: 176/sq mi (67.8/km^{2})
- Time zone: UTC-6 (Central (CST))
  - Summer (DST): UTC-5 (CDT)
- ZIP code: 54420
- Area codes: 715 & 534
- GNIS feature ID: 1563021

Chili is an unincorporated census-designated place in the Town of Fremont in Clark County, Wisconsin, United States. Chili is west-southwest of Marshfield. Chili has a post office with ZIP code 54420. As of the 2020 census, Chili had a population of 205.

== History ==
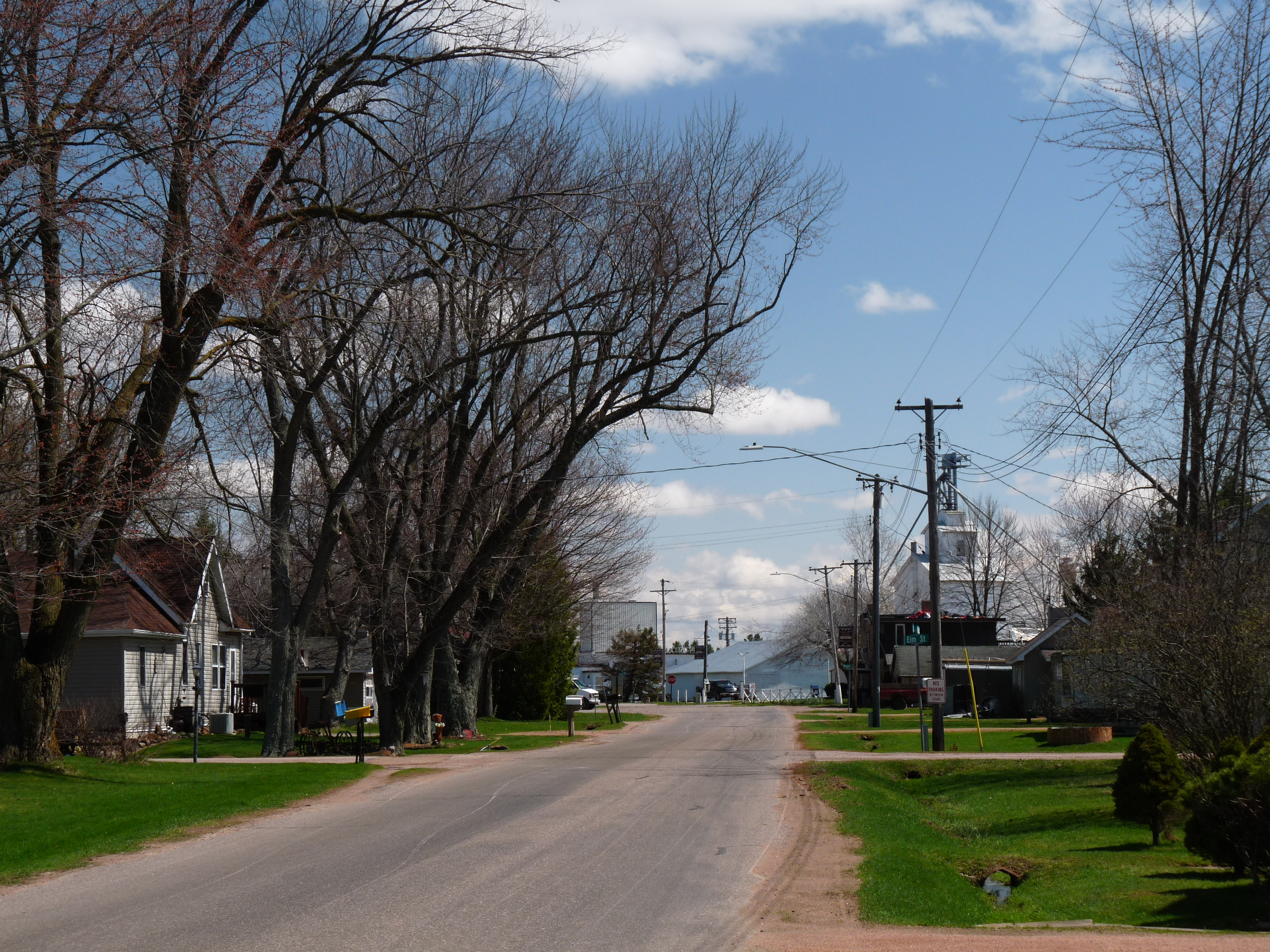
Facing east on Chili Road toward the downtown

Around the year 1880 the Chicago and North Western Railway built through this area in south-east Clark County to take care of local sawmills. There was a sawmill about a mile east of where the railroad had put in a siding called Cedarhurst. Another such sawmill was built at the present-day CDP of Chili, and grew to be a rather extensive operation. One blistering, cold day during the winter of 1881, the railroad officials came here for the purpose of choosing a name for the then-hamlet. It was so wintry cold they did not want to step out of the train, it was then that one of them is supposed to have said, "Let's call this stop Chili because it is really chilly here." On another account, the community is also said to be named after the country Chile, in South America.

A post office called Chili has been in operation since 1892.
