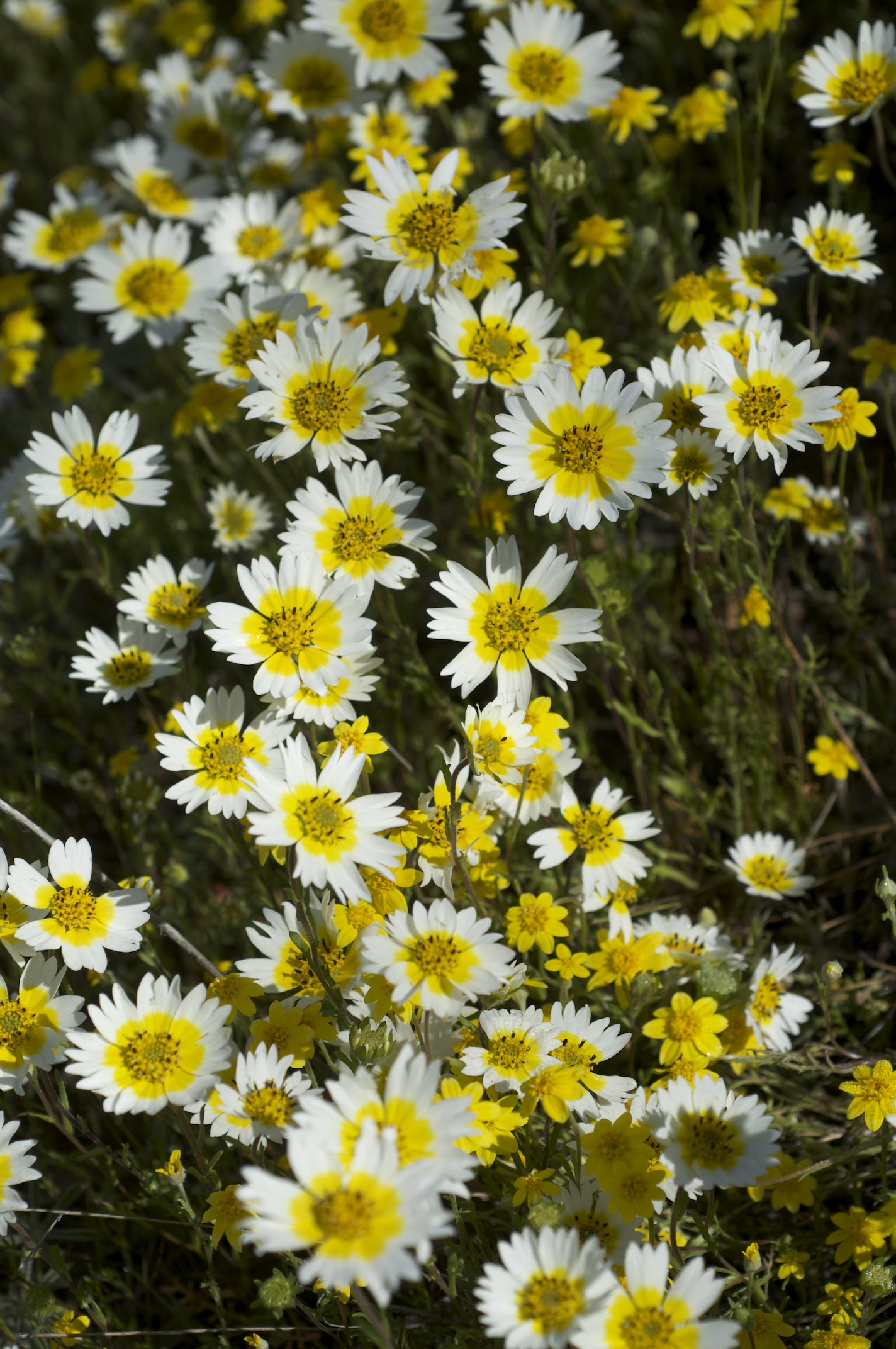

Scientific classification
- Kingdom: Plantae
- Clade: Tracheophytes
- Clade: Angiosperms
- Clade: Eudicots
- Clade: Asterids
- Order: Asterales
- Family: Asteraceae
- Genus: Layia
- Species: L. fremontii

Binomial name
- Layia fremontii (Torr. & Gray) Gray

= Layia fremontii =

Species of flowering plant

Layia fremontii is a species of flowering plant in the family Asteraceae known by the common name Frémont's tidytips. Both its common name, and its specific epithet are derived from John C. Frémont.

It is endemic to California, where it grows in the northern Coast Ranges, the Central Valley, and the Sierra Nevada foothills.

== Description ==
Layia fremontii is an annual herb growing a nonglandular erect stem to a maximum height approaching 40 centimeters. The linear or lance-shaped leaves are somewhat fleshy, with the lower ones multilobed and approaching 7 centimeters in maximum length.

The flower head has a base of phyllaries with fuzzy margins and hairy, bumpy surfaces. Like many other species of tidytips, the ray florets are bright yellow tipped neatly with white. The disc florets are yellow with purple anthers. The fruit is a hairy achene with a pappus of many white scales.
