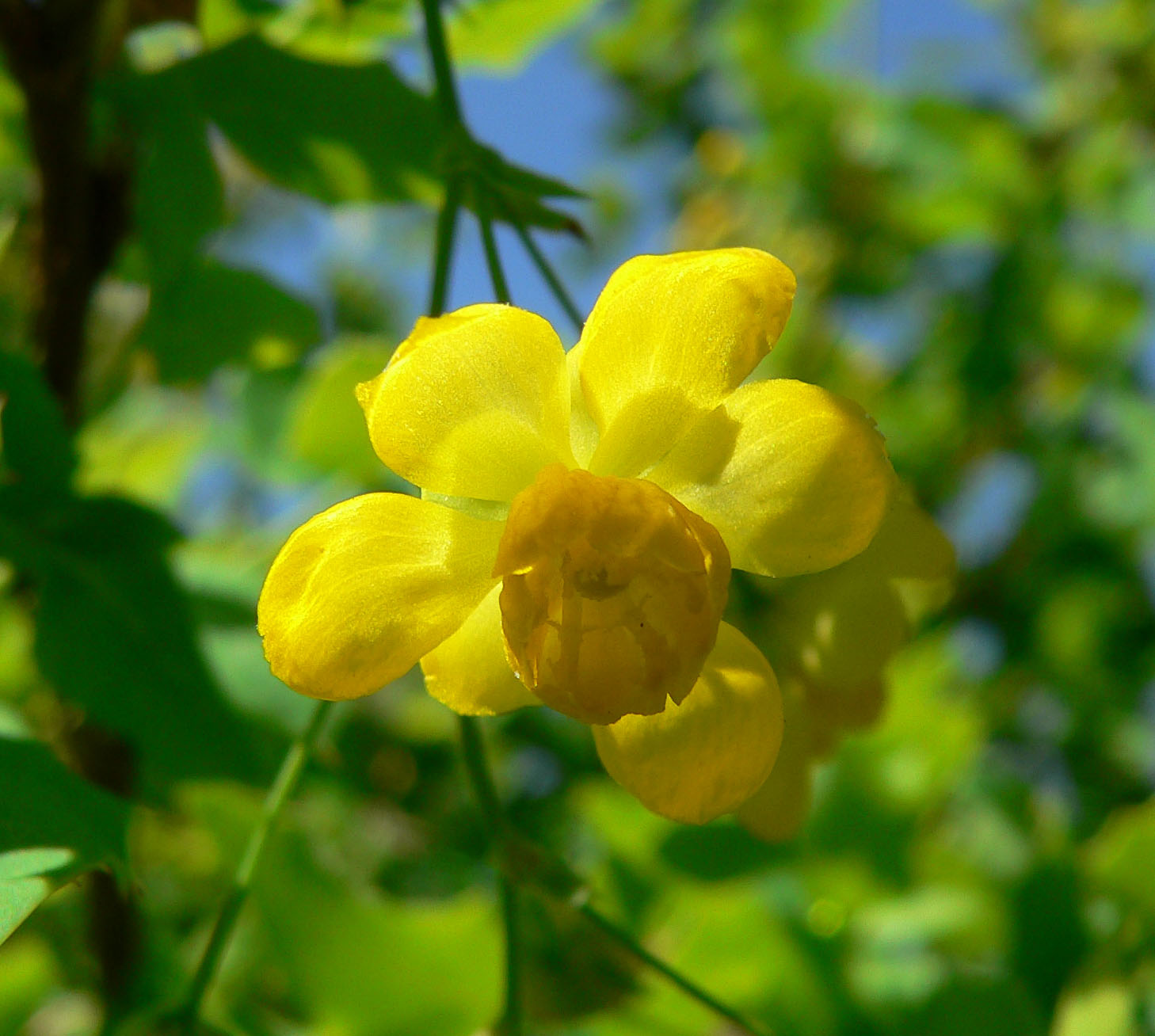

Scientific classification
- Kingdom: Plantae
- Clade: Tracheophytes
- Clade: Angiosperms
- Clade: Eudicots
- Order: Ranunculales
- Family: Berberidaceae
- Genus: Berberis
- Species: B. fremontii

Binomial name
- Berberis fremontii Torr.

Synonyms
- Alloberberis fremontii (Torr.) C.C.Yu & K.F.Chung; Mahonia fremontii (Torr.) Fedde; Odostemon fremontii (Torr.) Rydb.

= Berberis fremontii =

Berry and plant

Berberis fremontii is a species of barberry known by the common name Frémont's mahonia (after John C. Frémont).

== Description ==
Berberis fremontii is an erect evergreen shrub growing up to 4.5 meters tall. The leaves are several centimeters long and are made up of several holly-leaf-shaped leaflets, each most often 1–2.6 centimeters long and edged with spiny teeth. The leaves are purplish when new, green when mature, and greenish blue when aged.

The abundant inflorescences each bear 8 to 12 bright yellow flowers, blooming in the spring. Each flower is made up of nine sepals and six petals all arranged in whorls of three. The fruit is a berry up to 1.5 centimeters wide, ranging in color from yellowish to purple to nearly black.

== Taxonomy ==
Berberis fremontii was scientifically described and named by John Torrey. For many years it has been part of the controversy on if parts of the Berberis genus should be classified as Mahonia. Friedrich Karl Georg Fedde classified it as Mahonia fremontii in 1901. However, as of 2023 Plants of the World Online (POWO) classifies it as part of Berberis.

=== Names ===
The plant was named in honor of John C. Frémont.

== Distribution and habitat ==
Berberis fremontii is native to mountainous regions of the US states of Arizona, Nevada, California, Colorado, New Mexico and Utah. It grows in desert grassland and pinyon-juniper woodland.

== Uses ==
The Zuni people use the crushed berries as a purple coloring for the skin and for objects employed in ceremonies.
