= Fremont C. Chamberlain =

American politician (1856–1931)

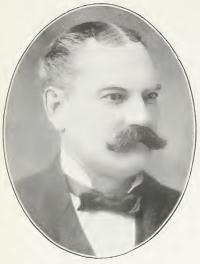
Fremont C. Chamberlain

Fremont C. Chamberlain (October 6, 1856 – December 4, 1931) was a member of the Michigan House of Representatives.

== Biography ==
Chamberlain was born on October 6, 1856, in Ripon, Wisconsin. Attending Ripon College, for a dozen years he taught school in Marquette County, Michigan, beginning in 1875. In 1887, he relocated to Gogebic County, and there married Etta Bartle on February 8, 1897.

== Career ==
After his move to Gogebic County, Chamberlain practiced law and served as supervisor, school inspector and circuit court commissioner. As a Republican, he was a member of the Michigan House of Representatives from 1893 to 1900. Being 6' 6" in height, he was referred to as the "Tall Pine of the Gogebic." After leaving the House, he practiced law in Detroit, and in 1905 moved to New York, where he associated with the Tammany Hall political machine. He died in Cleveland, Ohio, on December 4, 1931.
