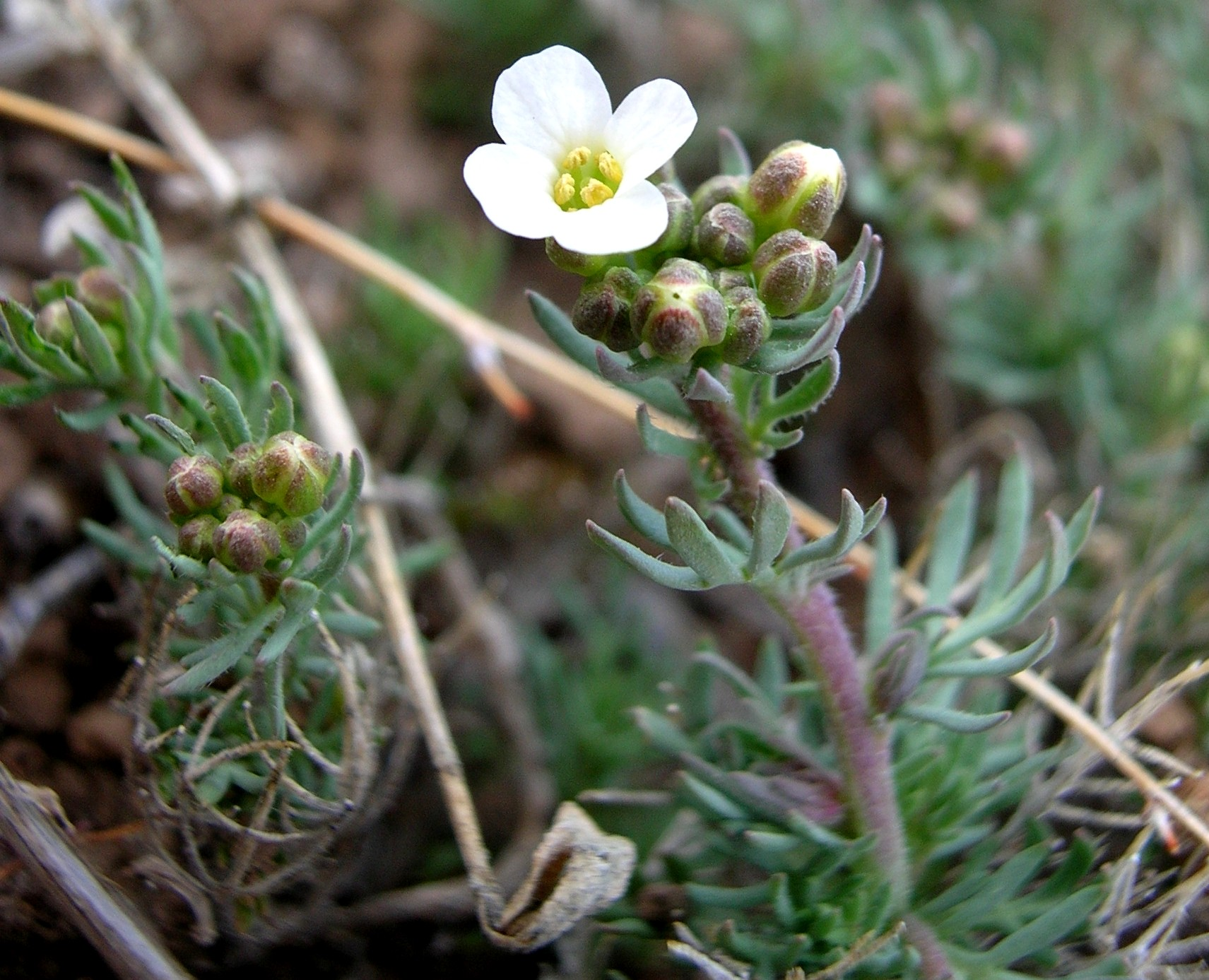
- Polyctenium fremontii flower

Scientific classification
- Kingdom: Plantae
- Clade: Tracheophytes
- Clade: Angiosperms
- Clade: Eudicots
- Clade: Rosids
- Order: Brassicales
- Family: Brassicaceae
- Genus: Polyctenium; Greene
- Species: P. fremontii

Binomial name
- Polyctenium fremontii (S.Watson) Greene

Synonyms
- Braya pectinata Greene; Polyctenium bisulcatum Greene; Polyctenium fremontii var. bisulcatumx (Greene) Rollins; Polyctenium fremontii var. confertum Rollins; Polyctenium glabellum Greene; Polyctenium fremontii var. typicum Rollins; Polyctenium williamsiae Rollins; Smelowskia fremontii S.Watson (1876) (basionym); Smelowskia fremontii var. bisulcata (Greene) O.E.Schulz; Smelowskia fremontii var. glabella (Greene) O.E.Schulz

= Polyctenium =

Genus of flowering plants

Polyctenium is a genus of flowering plants in the family Brassicaceae. It contains a single species, Polyctenium fremontii, the desert combleaf, a small and compact plant native to the northern Great Basin region of the Western United States. The plants are known by the common name combleaf, owing to the resemblance of their deeply lobed leaves to a comb. It grows in sagebrush shrub steppe in northeastern California, southeastern Oregon, southwestern Idaho, and northwestern Nevada.

It is named both in English and Greek for its deeply lobed leaves, which almost appear to be pinnately compound. It takes the other portion of its scientific name from John C. Frémont. Leaves have forked hairs, and the distal end of the leaf often has a single hair at the very tip. As is characteristic of the broccoli family, the white flowers have four petals in the shape of a cross. The flowers appear in clusters at the ends of the stems.

This plant is among the first plants of sagebrush country in the inland western U.S. to bloom in spring. It is found on the banks of seasonal streams and similar places.

Some consider Polyctenium williamsiae, commonly known as the Washoe combleaf or the Williams combleaf, to be a distinct species native to the Washoe Valley playas of the Virginia Range. Plants of the World Online treats it a synonym of P. fremontii. It is listed as a critically endangered and fully protected species by the State of Nevada.
