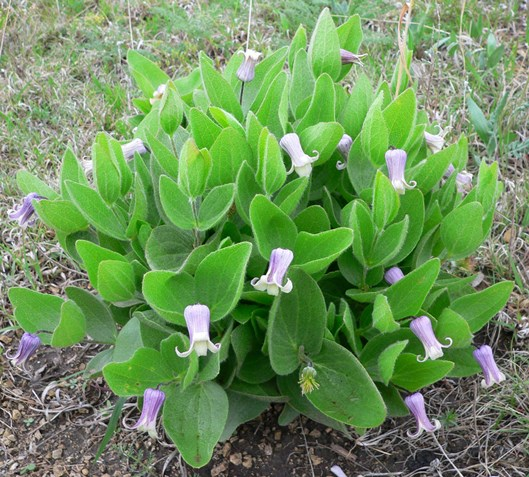
- At Kirwin National Wildlife Refuge

Conservation status
- Secure (NatureServe)

Scientific classification
- Kingdom: Plantae
- Clade: Tracheophytes
- Clade: Angiosperms
- Clade: Eudicots
- Order: Ranunculales
- Family: Ranunculaceae
- Genus: Clematis
- Species: C. fremontii

Binomial name
- Clematis fremontii S.Watson

= Clematis fremontii =

Species of flowering plant in the buttercup family

Clematis fremontii is a species of flowering plant in the buttercup family known as Fremont's leather flower. It is endemic to the United States where it is known from several disjunct populations throughout the central and southeastern states. Previously unknown populations were discovered in the mid-2000s in Tennessee and Georgia. Other names for this plant include Fremont's crowsfoot, Fremont's leather-plant, leatherplant, and rattleweed.

== Description ==
This species produces hairy stems up to 70 cm (28 in) tall, but usually they are between 15 and 40 cm (5.9 and 15.7 in). The leathery leaves are oval in shape and up to 14 cm (5.5 in) long and 11 cm (4.3 in) wide. The inflorescence is a single urn-shaped flower. The flower has hairy bluish or purple lance-shaped sepals with greenish tips. The fruits are long achenes borne in a cluster.

This plant is generally found on limestone soils in glades and prairies. It is sometimes planted in gardens.

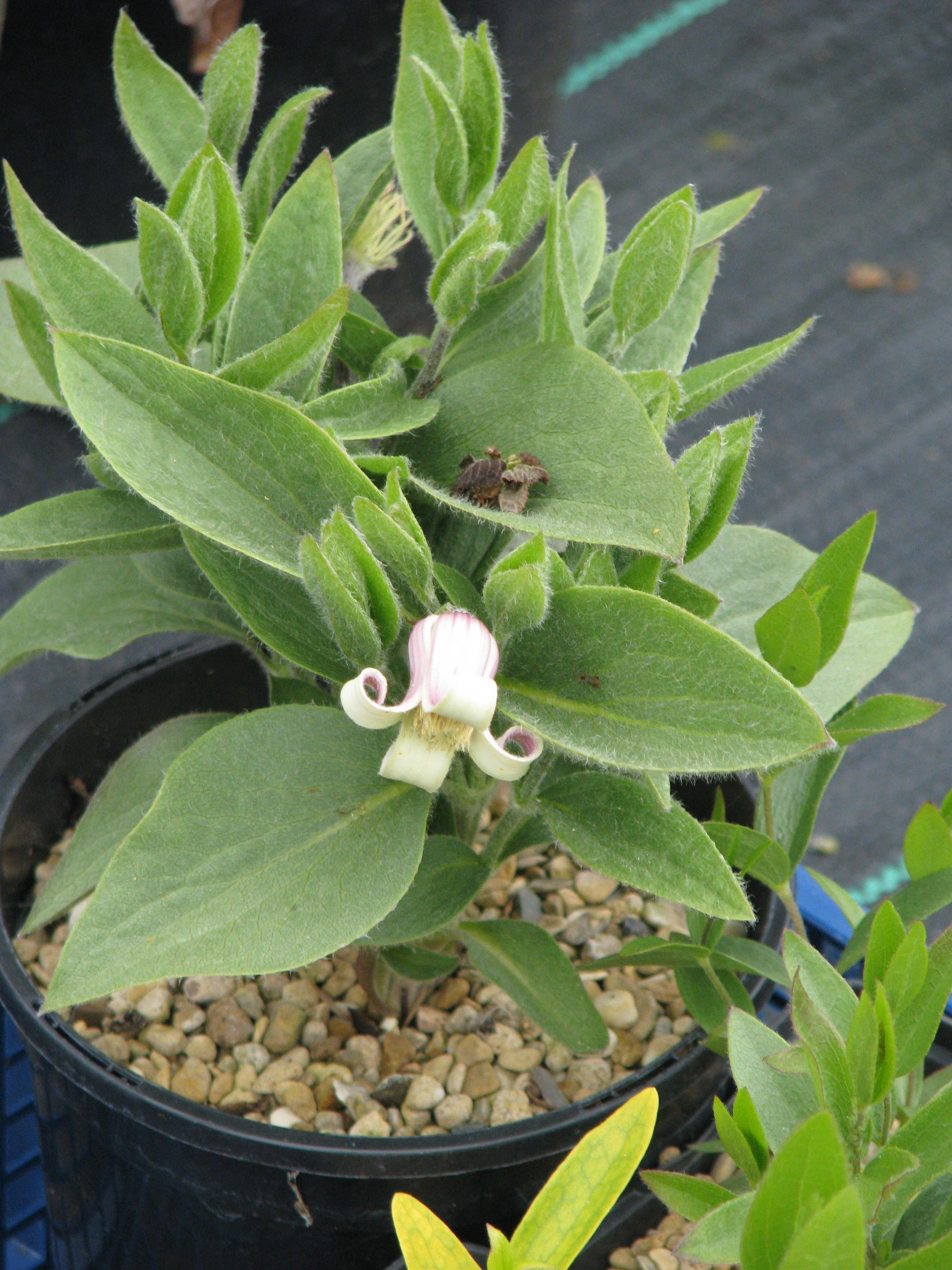
In cultivation
