= Fremont Bridge =

Fremont Bridge may refer to:

- Fremont Bridge (Portland, Oregon)
- Fremont Bridge (Seattle)
