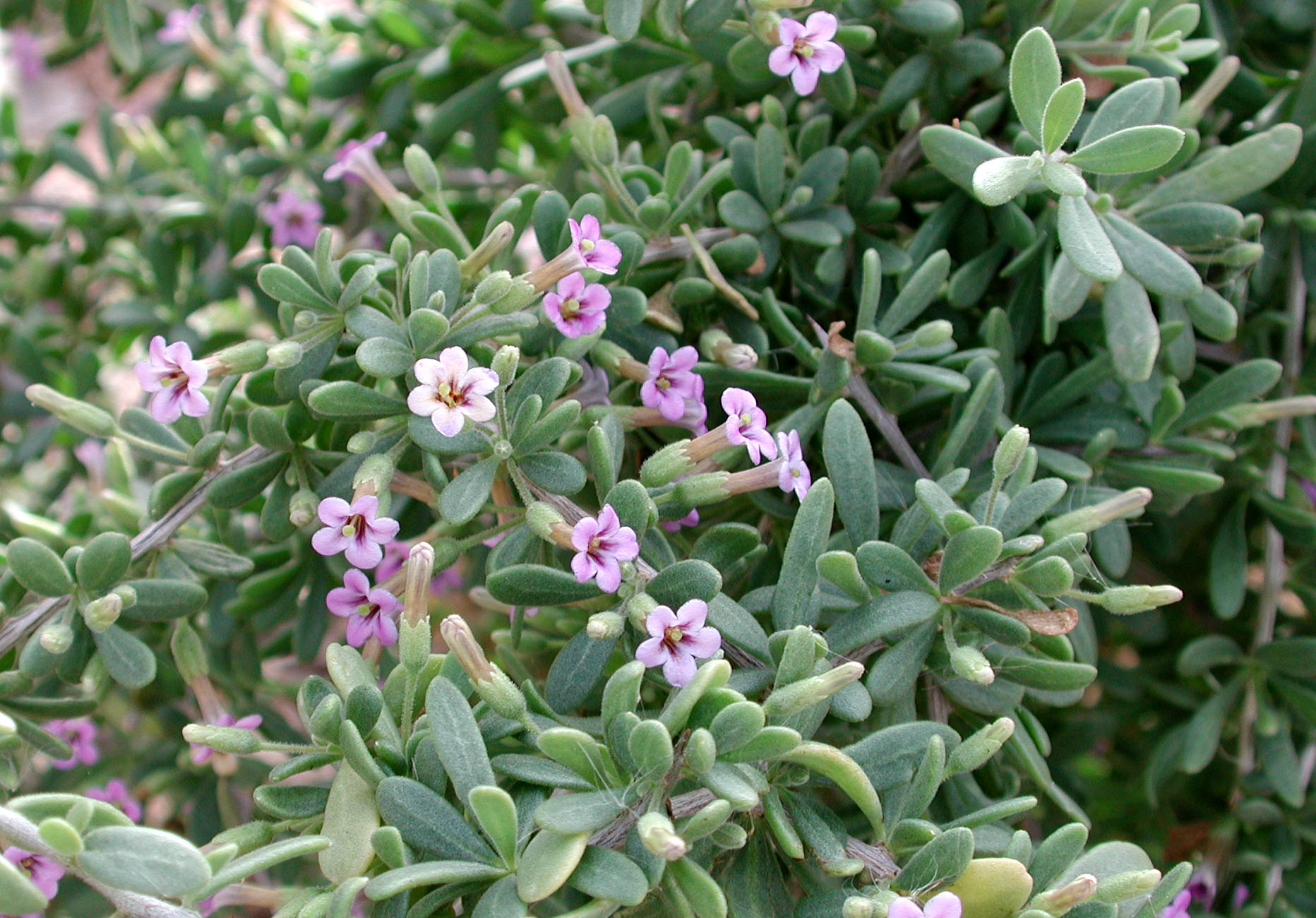

Scientific classification
- Kingdom: Plantae
- Clade: Tracheophytes
- Clade: Angiosperms
- Clade: Eudicots
- Clade: Asterids
- Order: Solanales
- Family: Solanaceae
- Genus: Lycium
- Species: L. fremontii

Binomial name
- Lycium fremontii A.Gray

= Lycium fremontii =

Species of flowering plant

Lycium fremontii is a species of flowering plant in the nightshade family, Solanaceae, that is native to northwestern Mexico and the southernmost mountains and deserts of California and Arizona in the United States. It often grows in areas with alkaline soils, such as alkali flats.

Both its common name, Frémont's desert thorn, and its specific epithet, "fremontii", are derived from John C. Frémont.

== Description ==
Lycium fremontii is a bushy, spreading shrub approaching a maximum height of 4 m (13 ft) with many thorny, leafy branches. The fleshy leaves are oval in shape and up to 2.5 cm (0.98 in) long. Parts of the plant are coated in glandular hairs.

The inflorescence is a small cluster of tubular flowers roughly 1–2 cm (0.39–0.79 in) long including the cylindrical calyx of fleshy sepals at the base. The flower is light to deep purple with purple veining. The corolla is a narrow tube opening into usually five lobes. The fruit is a red berry 6–8 mm (0.24–0.31 in) diameter.
