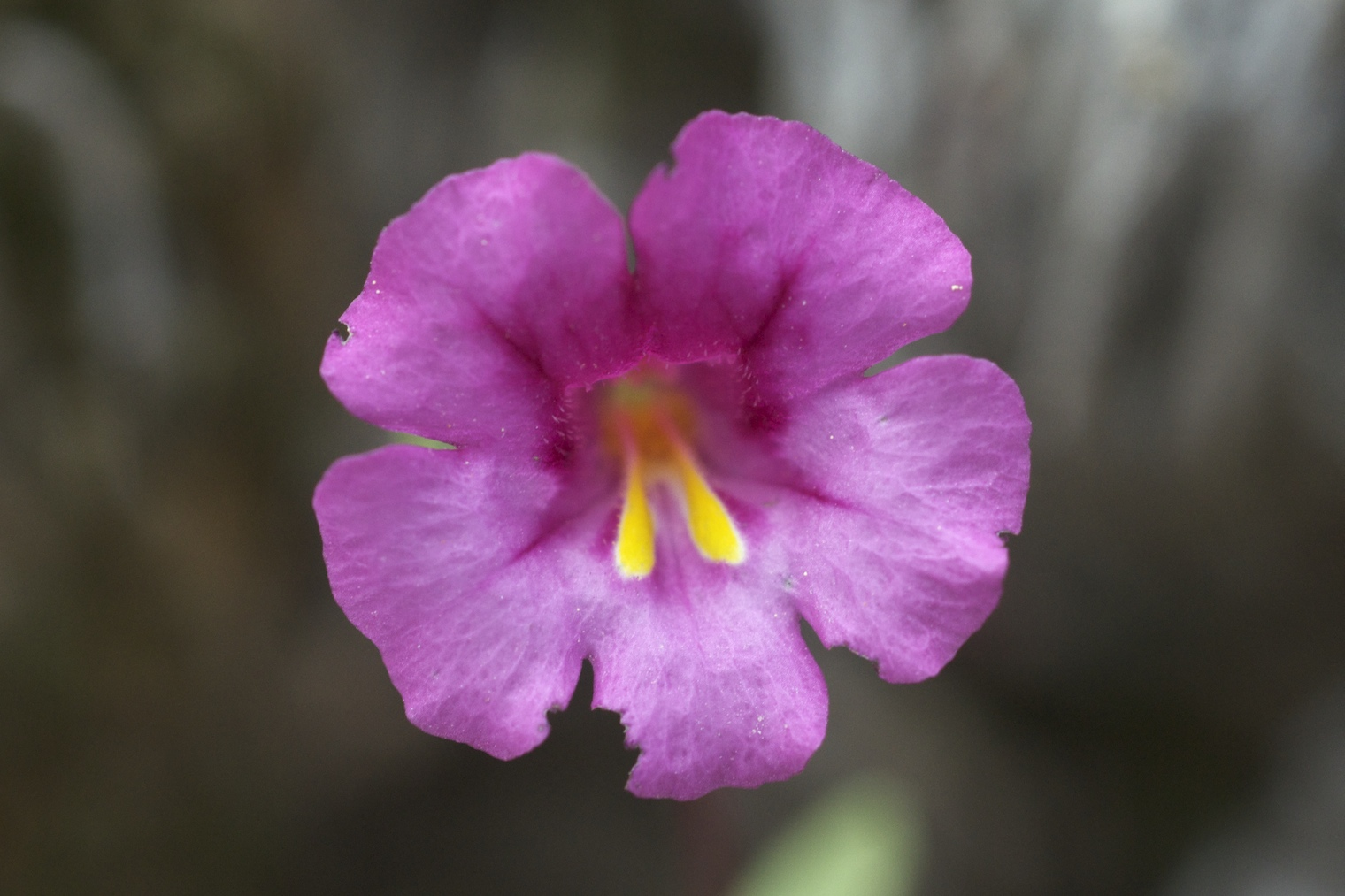

Conservation status
- Apparently Secure (NatureServe)

Scientific classification
- Kingdom: Plantae
- Clade: Embryophytes
- Clade: Tracheophytes
- Clade: Angiosperms
- Clade: Eudicots
- Clade: Asterids
- Order: Lamiales
- Family: Phrymaceae
- Genus: Diplacus
- Species: D. fremontii

Binomial name
- Diplacus fremontii (Benth.) G.L.Nesom

Synonyms
- Eunanus fremontii Benth.; Eunanus subsecundus ([A.Gray]]) Greene; Mimulus fremontii (Benth.) A.Gray; Mimulus subsecundus A.Gray

= Diplacus fremontii =

Species of flowering plant

Diplacus fremontii is a species of monkeyflower known by the common name Frémont's monkeyflower. It is native to California and Baja California, where it grows in mountain and desert habitat, especially moist or disturbed areas. It was formerly known as Mimulus fremontii.

== Description ==
Diplacus fremontii is an annual herb with a thin stem growing 1 to 20 centimeters tall. The oval leaves are up to 3 centimeters long, the ones higher on the plant are hairy in texture. The tubular base of the flower is encapsulated in a wide, ribbed, hairy calyx of sepals with pointed lobes. The corolla of the flower is reddish-purple with a darker pink throat with a yellow spot. There are occasionally all-yellow flowers. The flower is one to two centimeters in length.
