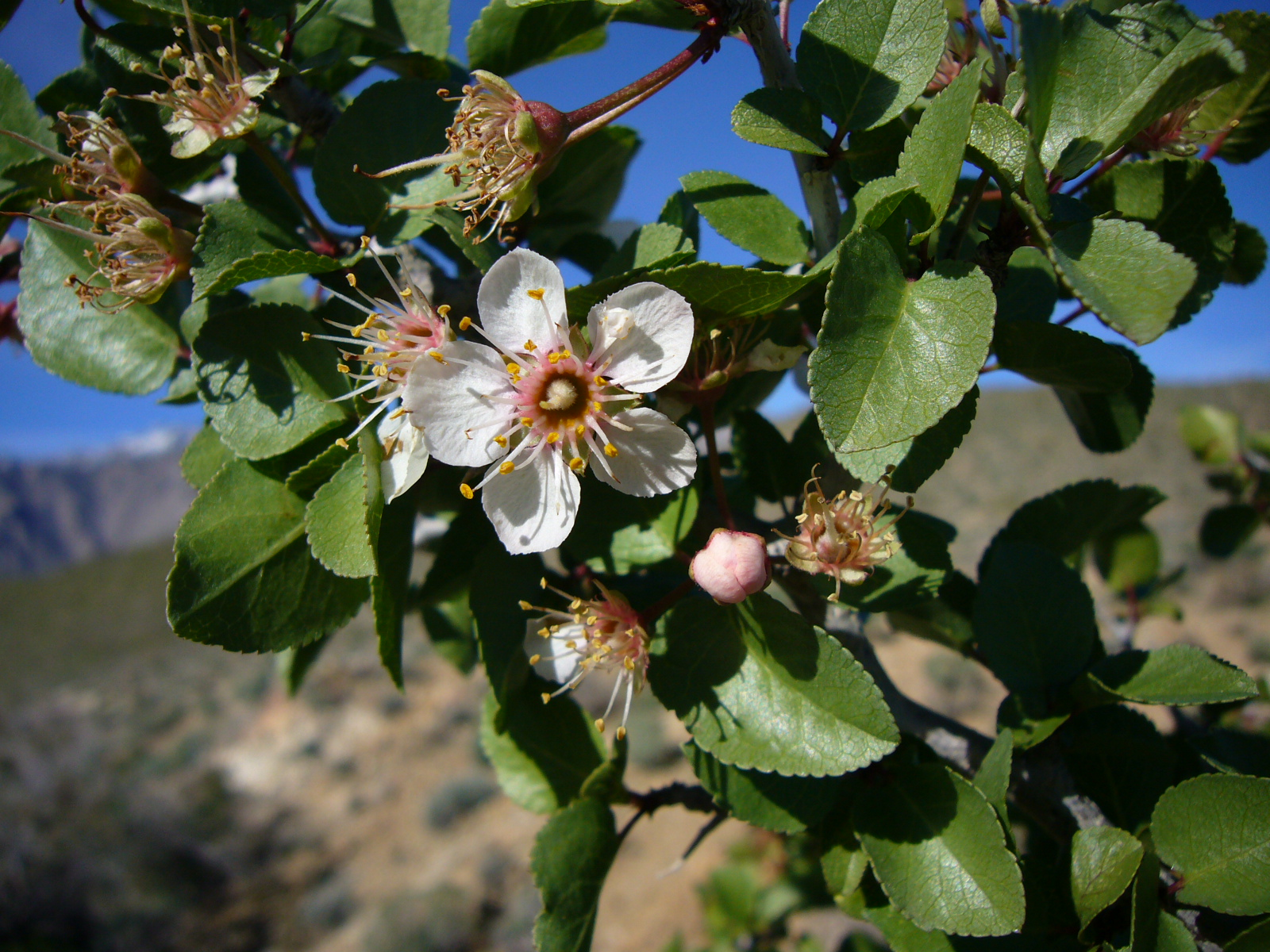
- Flowers in Palm Springs, California

Conservation status
- Least Concern (IUCN 3.1)

Scientific classification
- Kingdom: Plantae
- Clade: Embryophytes
- Clade: Tracheophytes
- Clade: Angiosperms
- Clade: Eudicots
- Clade: Rosids
- Order: Rosales
- Family: Rosaceae
- Genus: Prunus
- Species: P. fremontii

Binomial name
- Prunus fremontii S.Watson
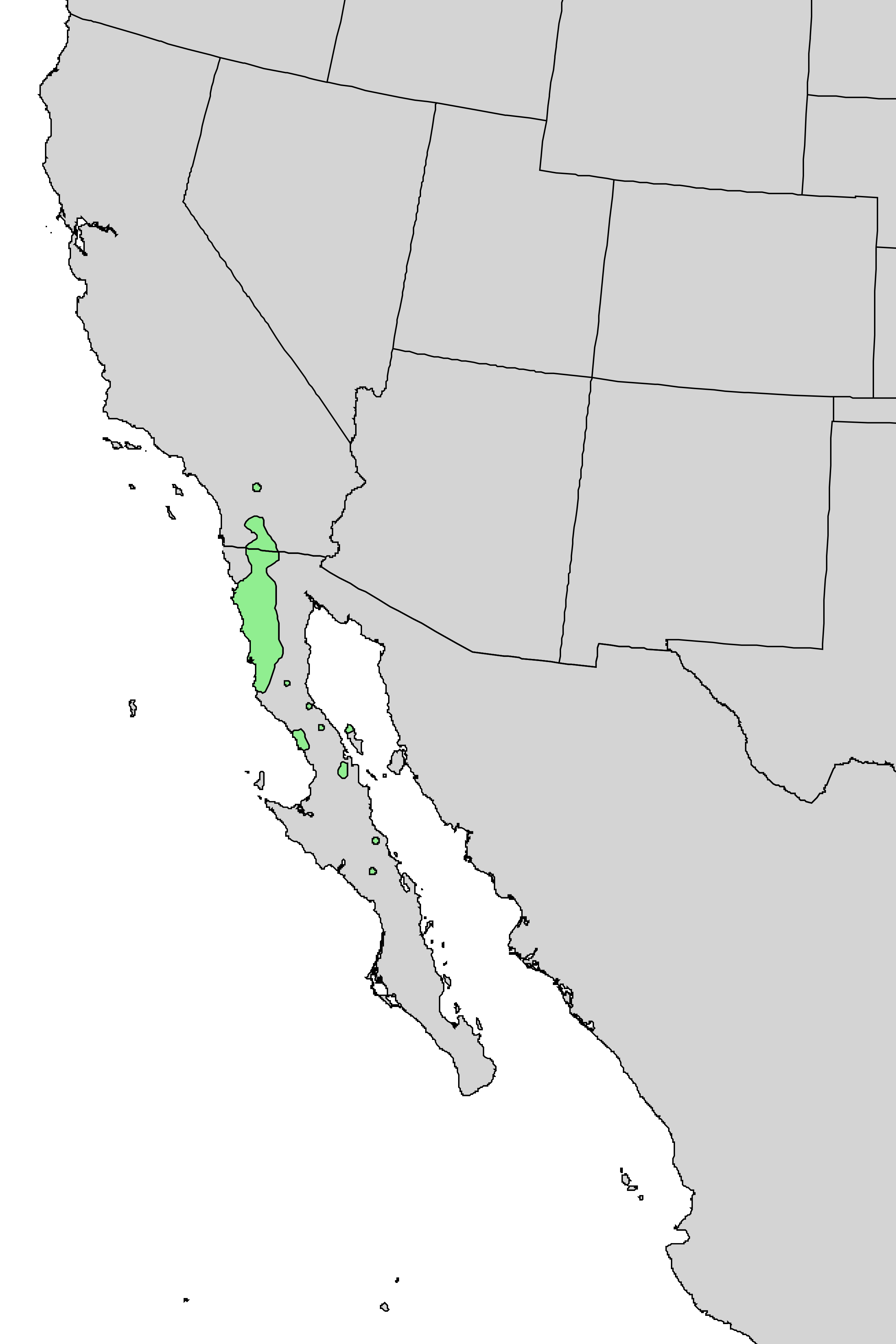
- Natural range of Prunus fremontii

Synonyms
- Prunus fremonti S.Watson; Prunus eriogyna S.C. Mason; Amygdalus fremontii (S.Watson) Abrams; Emplectocladus fremontii (S.Watson) Dayton

= Prunus fremontii =

Species of tree

Prunus fremontii is a North American species of plants in the rose family, known by the common name desert apricot.

== Description ==
Prunus fremontii is a deciduous shrub or small tree reaching up to 5 metres (16 feet) in height. The flowers are white or pink, blooming about the same time as the leaves unfurl in the spring. The fruits are yellow and egg-shaped.

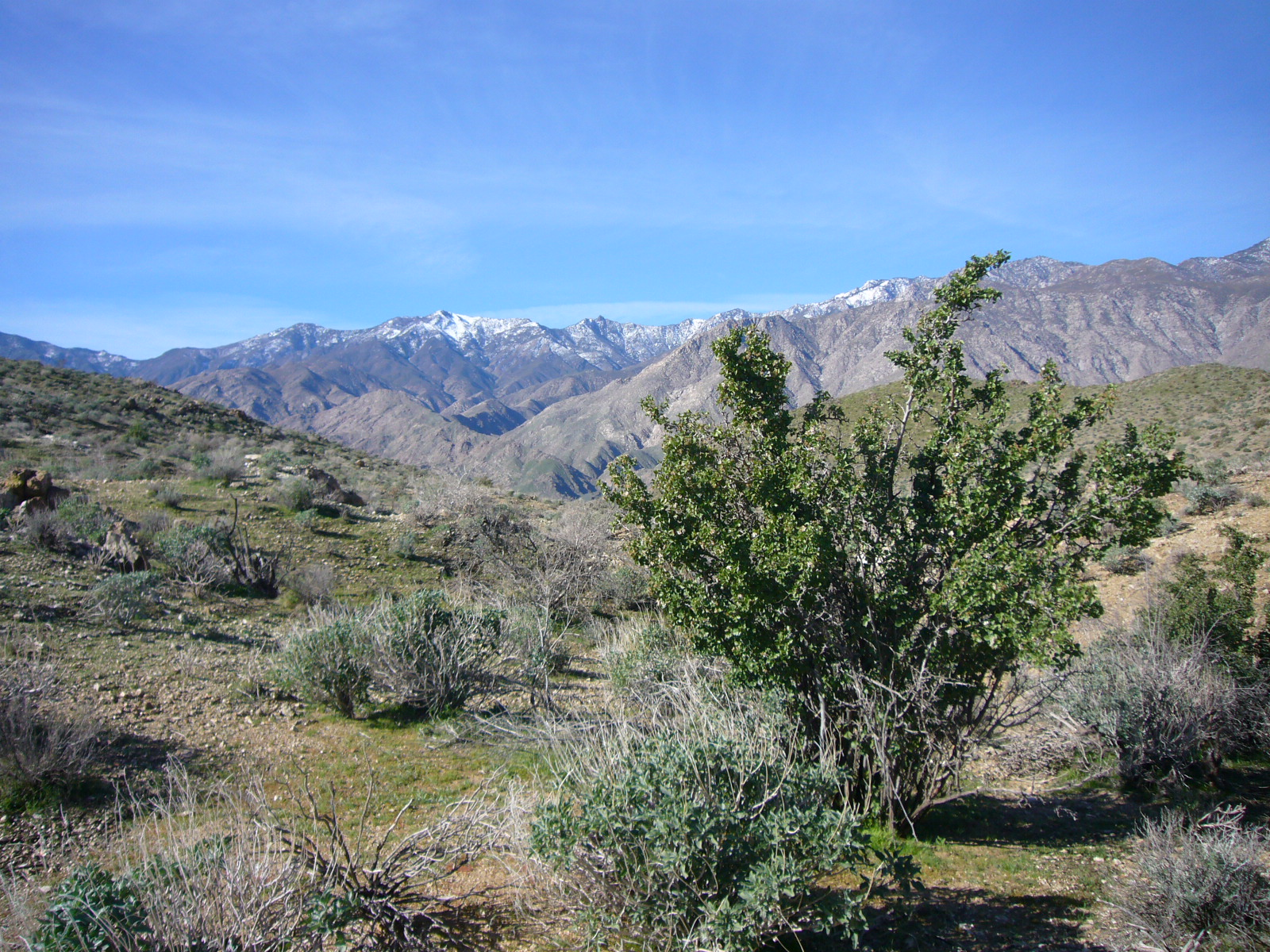
P. fremontii in desert chaparral habitat

== Taxonomy ==
The species takes its scientific name from John C. Frémont.

== Distribution and habitat ==
The plant is found in southern California, northern and western Baja California, and northern Baja California Sur.

== Uses ==
The fruits are an important food for Native American groups, such as the Cahuilla.
