= Fremont County =

Fremont County may refer to:

- Fremont County, Colorado
- Fremont County, Idaho
- Fremont County, Iowa
- Fremont County, Wyoming
- Fremont County, Kansas Territory
