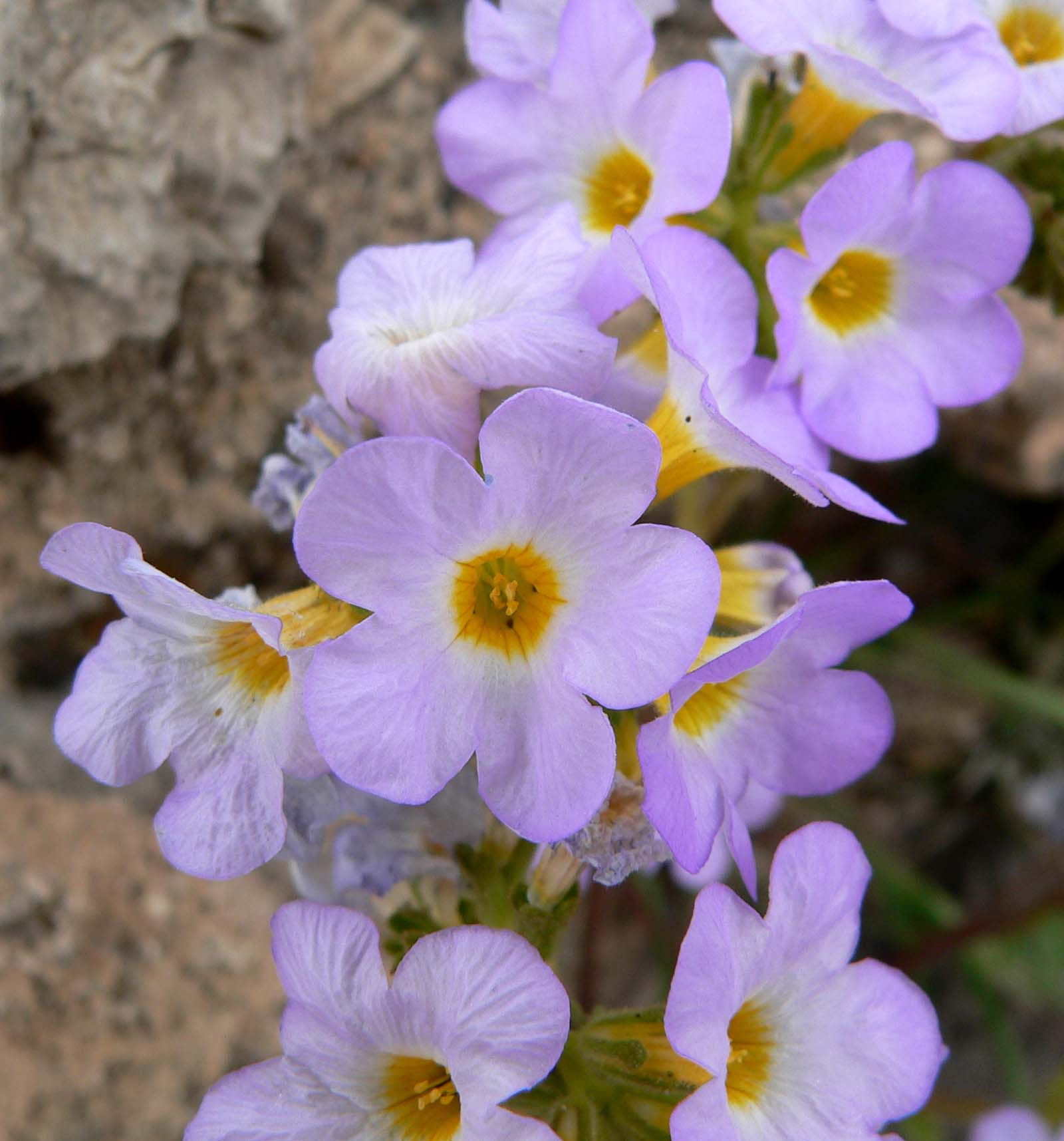

Conservation status
- Apparently Secure (NatureServe)

Scientific classification
- Kingdom: Plantae
- Clade: Tracheophytes
- Clade: Angiosperms
- Clade: Eudicots
- Clade: Asterids
- Order: Boraginales
- Family: Hydrophyllaceae
- Genus: Phacelia
- Species: P. fremontii

Binomial name
- Phacelia fremontii Torr.

= Phacelia fremontii =

Species of plant

Phacelia fremontii (Frémont's phacelia) is a flowering plant in the family Hydrophyllaceae native to the southwestern United States. In California, its range includes the Mojave Desert, the San Joaquin Valley, the Coast Ranges, and the Sierra Nevada. It was named for John C. Frémont.

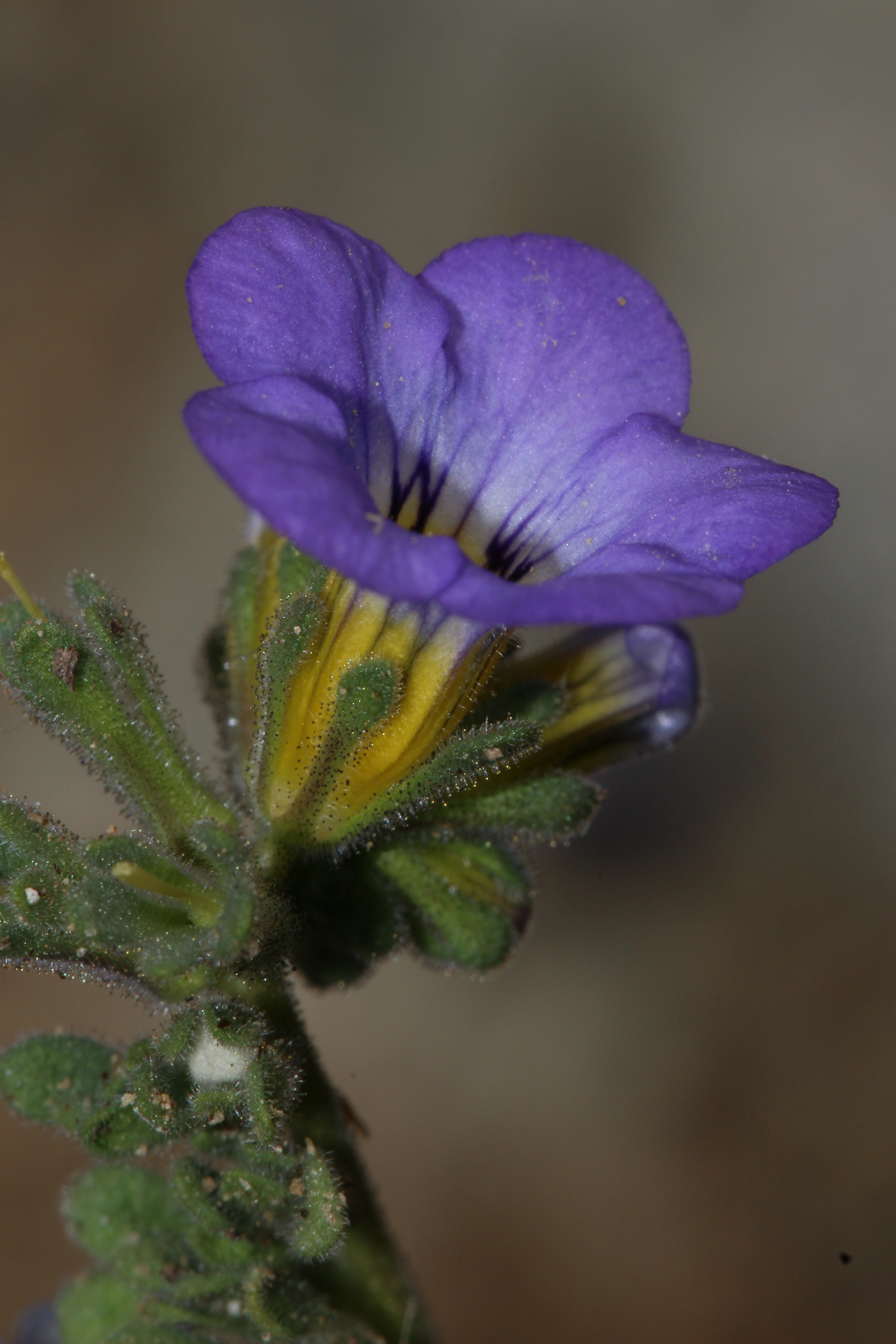
Calyx lobes, 3–5 millimetres (0.12–0.20 in), are covered with short glandular hairs.

== Description ==
Phacelia fremontii is an aromatic annual plant with a branching decumbent or erect stem up to 30 centimeters long. It is hairy, and glandular toward the inflorescence. The leaves are deeply lobed or divided into rounded leaflets, 15–50 millimetres (0.6–2.0 in). Calyx lobes are 3–5 millimetres (0.12–0.20 in), linear to oblanceolate, with short glandular hairs. The flower has a funnel- or bell-shaped corolla up to 1.5 to 2 centimeters long. It is blue, pink, or purple with a yellow throat.

The plant grows on sandy or gravelly soils in several habitat types, including scrub and grassland.
