= Tremont Township, Solano County, California =

Unincorporated community in California, United States

Coordinates: 38°29′39″N 121°42′16″W

Historical population
Census	Pop.	Note	%±
1870	640		—
1880	530		−17.2%

Tremont Township was a historical subdivision of Solano County, California, United States. It comprised the portions of Solano County opposite Putah Creek from Davisville (now Davis), in the northeastern part of the county. Tremont Township was defined by the Solano County Board of Supervisors on August 11, 1855, and appears on an 1890 map of Solano County. Civil townships are no longer legally recognized in California, and the Tremont name is no longer widely used; however, a Tremont Road and Tremont Cemetery remain in the historical township.
