= Fremont, Clark County, Wisconsin =

Fremont, Wisconsin
- Town
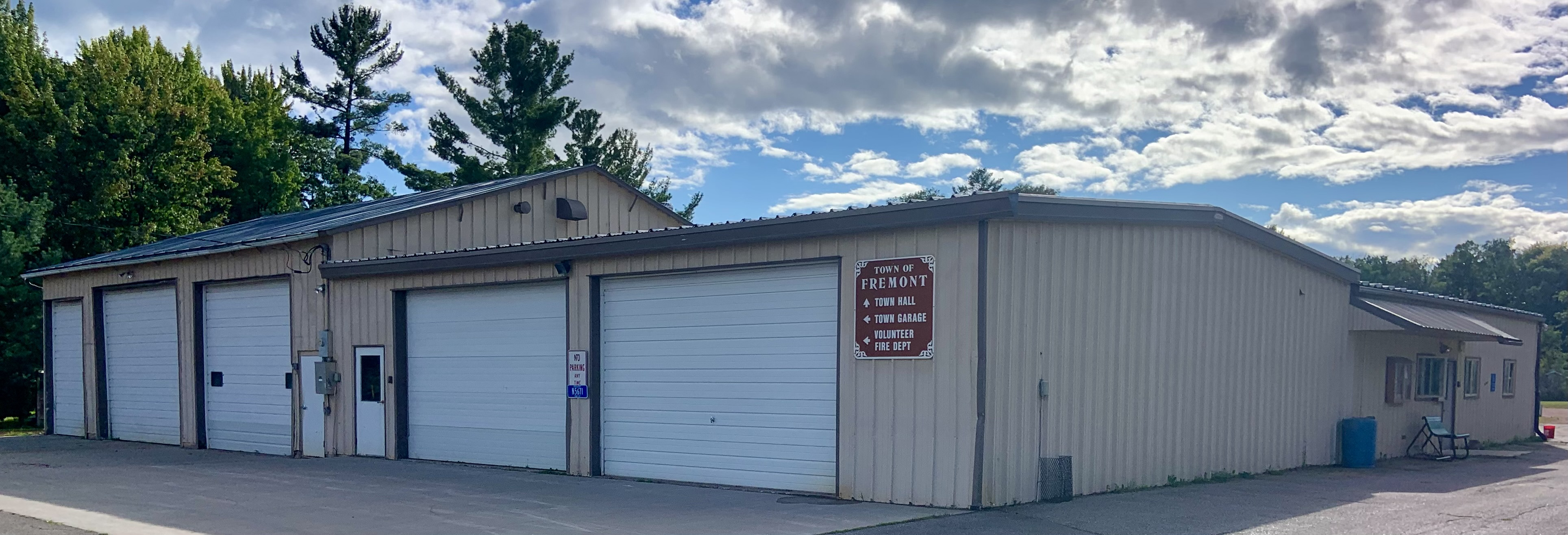
- Town hall

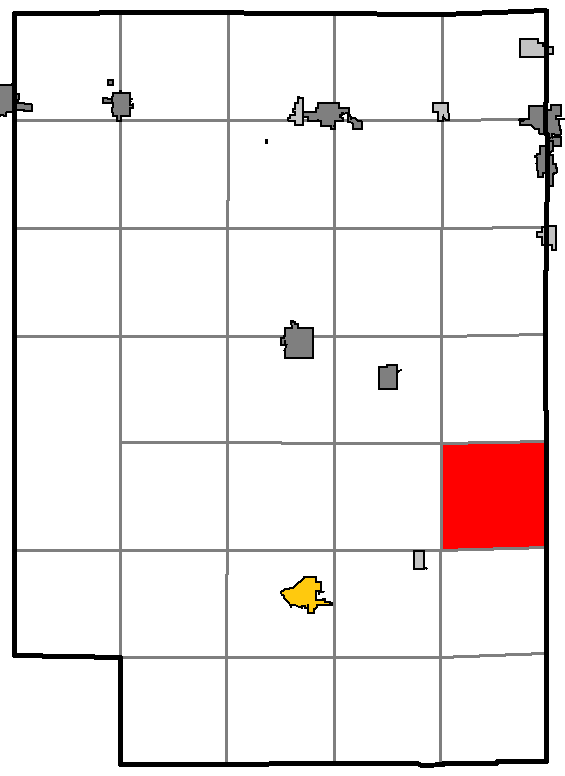
- Location of Fremont, Clark County

- Location of Clark County, Wisconsin
- Coordinates: 44°37′44″N 90°22′18″W
- Country: United States
- State: Wisconsin
- County: Clark

Government
  - Chairman: Ed Schultz

Area
  - Total: 35.3 sq mi (91.3 km^{2})
  - Land: 35.1 sq mi (91.0 km^{2})
  - Water: 0.12 sq mi (0.3 km^{2})
- Elevation: 1,240 ft (378 m)

Population (2020)
  - Total: 1,312
  - Density: 37.3/sq mi (14.4/km^{2})
- Time zone: UTC-6 (Central (CST))
  - Summer (DST): UTC-5 (CDT)
- Area codes: 715 & 534
- FIPS code: 55-27775
- GNIS feature ID: 1583245
- Website: www.townoffremont.com

Fremont is a town in Clark County in the U.S. state of Wisconsin. The population was 1,312 at the 2020 census. The unincorporated community of Chili is located in the community.

== Geography ==
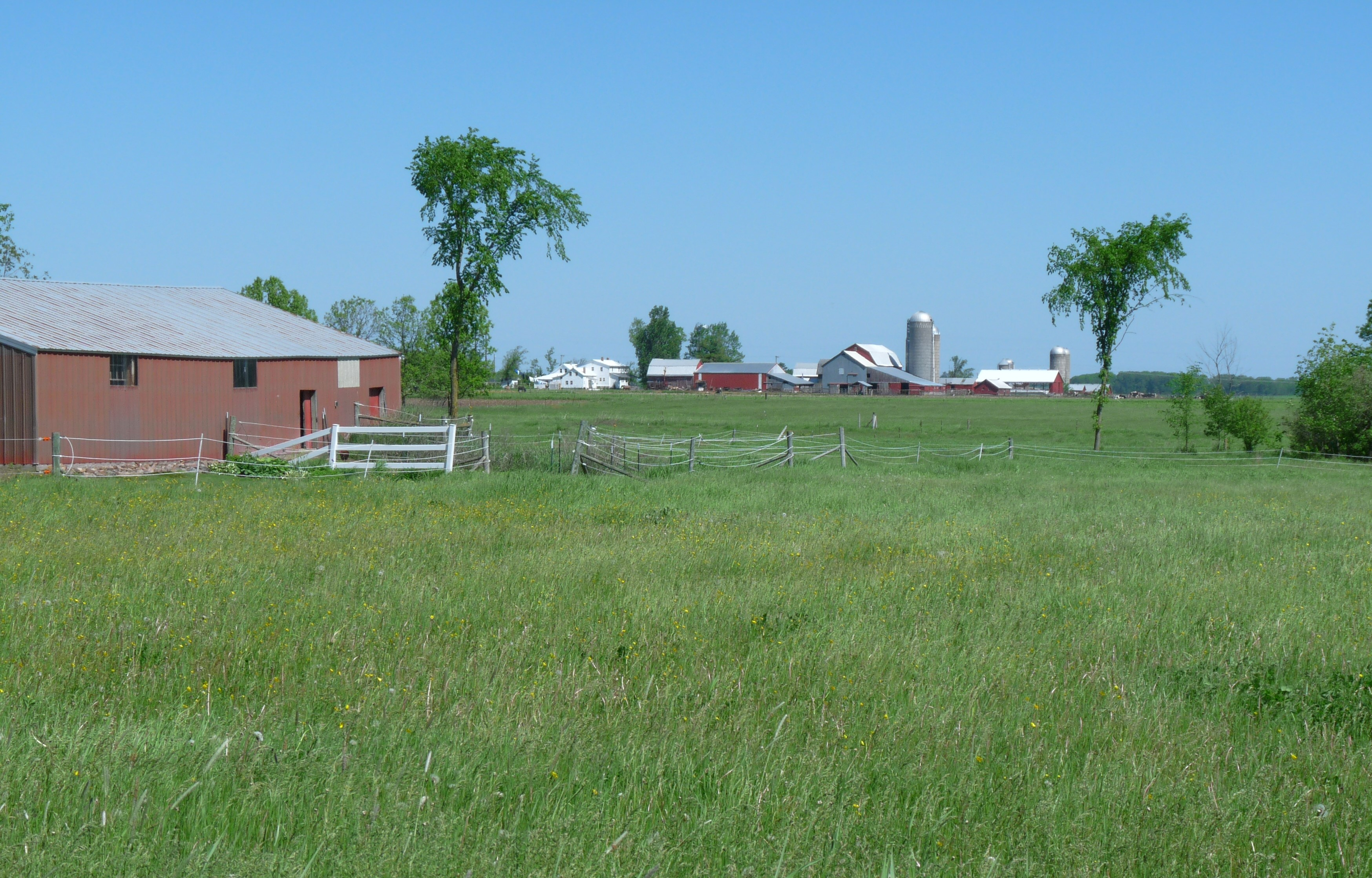
Much of Fremont is fairly flat farmland

The Town of Fremont is located along the eastern edge of Clark County and is bordered to the east by Wood County. According to the United States Census Bureau, the town has a total area of 35.3 square miles (91.3 km^{2}), of which 35.1 square miles (91.0 km^{2}) is land and 0.1 square miles (0.3 km^{2}), or 0.29%, is water.

== Demographics ==
As of the census of 2000, there were 1,190 people, 374 households, and 308 families residing in the town. The population density was 33.8 people per square mile (13.0/km^{2}). There were 393 housing units at an average density of 11.2 per square mile (4.3/km^{2}). The racial makeup of the town was 98.07% White, 0.08% Native American, 0.92% Asian, 0.42% from other races, and 0.50% from two or more races. Hispanic or Latino of any race were 1.43% of the population.

There were 374 households, out of which 46.5% had children under the age of 18 living with them, 72.7% were married couples living together, 5.6% had a female householder with no husband present, and 17.4% were non-families. 13.9% of all households were made up of individuals, and 6.7% had someone living alone who was 65 years of age or older. The average household size was 3.18 and the average family size was 3.52.

In the town, the population was spread out, with 33.4% under the age of 18, 10.7% from 18 to 24, 28.7% from 25 to 44, 18.7% from 45 to 64, and 8.6% who were 65 years of age or older. The median age was 30 years. For every 100 females, there were 108.0 males. For every 100 females age 18 and over, there were 101.3 males.

The median income for a household in the town was $35,167, and the median income for a family was $38,125. Males had a median income of $25,742 versus $19,313 for females. The per capita income for the town was $12,068. About 15.4% of families and 20.7% of the population were below the poverty line, including 30.2% of those under age 18 and 21.8% of those age 65 or over.
