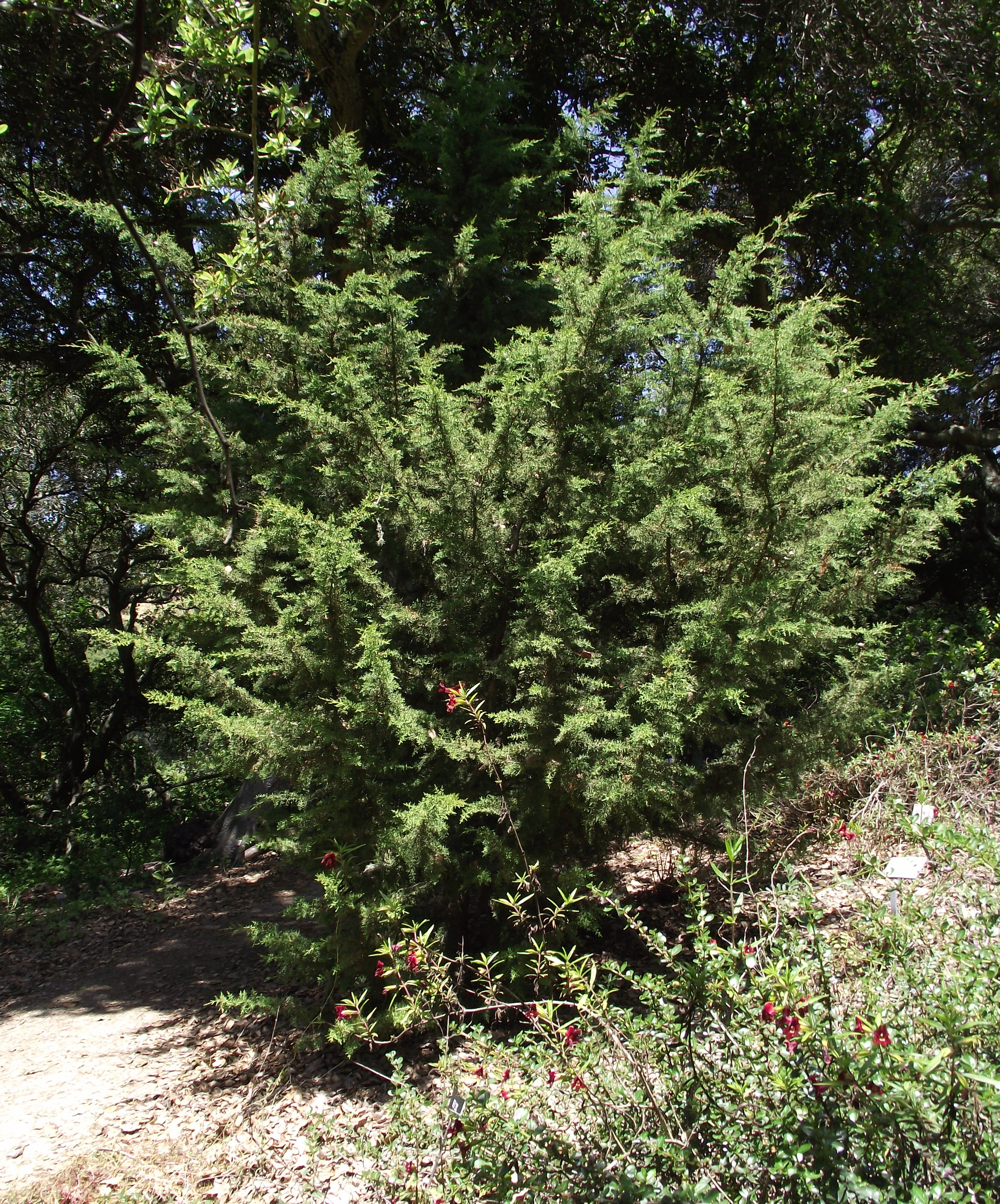
- Hesperocyparis goveniana at the UC Botanical Garden, Berkeley, California

Conservation status
- Endangered (IUCN 3.1)

- Imperiled (NatureServe)

Scientific classification
- Kingdom: Plantae
- Clade: Tracheophytes
- Clade: Gymnosperms
- Division: Pinophyta
- Class: Pinopsida
- Order: Cupressales
- Family: Cupressaceae
- Genus: Hesperocyparis
- Species: H. goveniana

Binomial name
- Hesperocyparis goveniana ((Gordon) Bartel
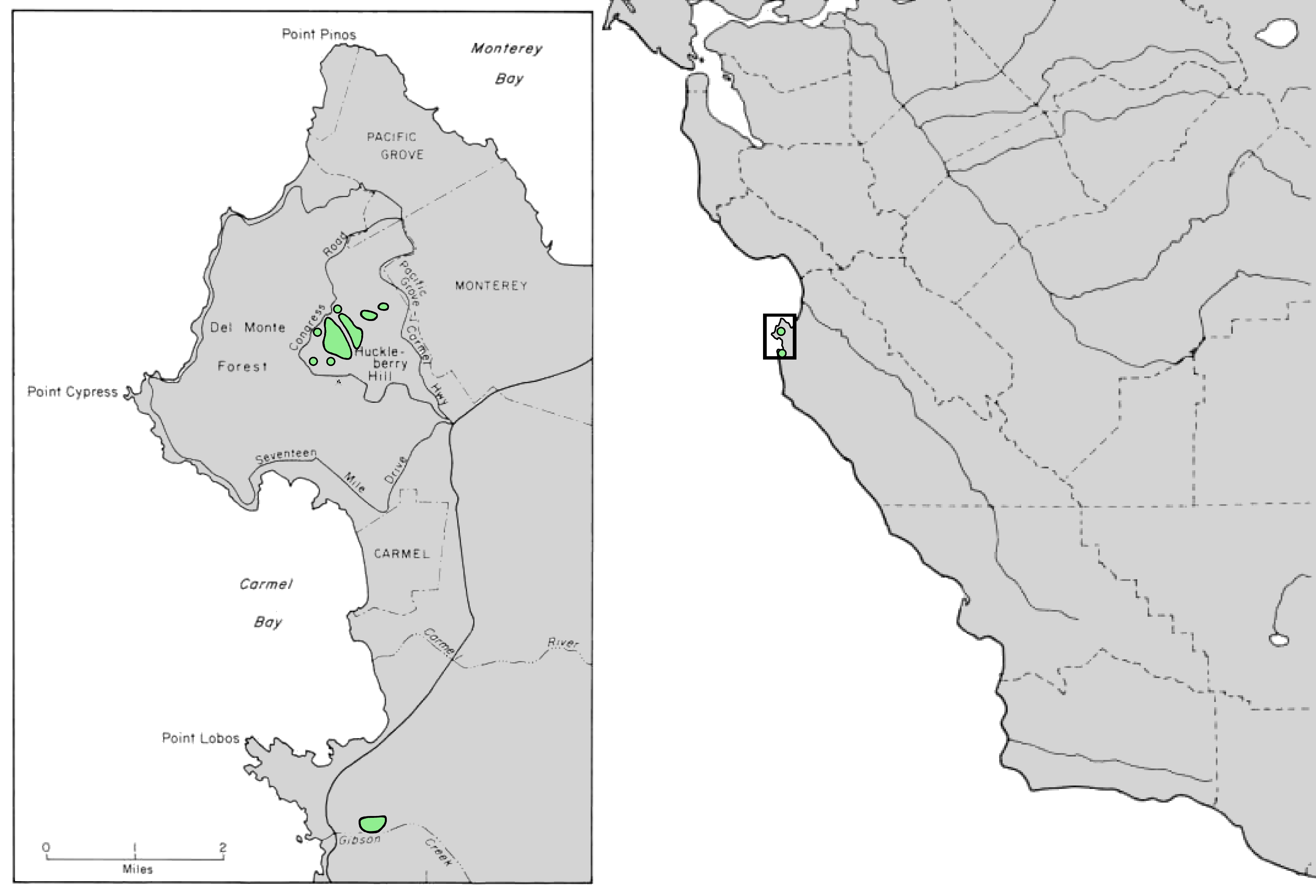
- Natural range of Hesperocyparis goveniana (sensu stricto)

Synonyms
- List: Callitropsis goveniana (Gordon) D.P.Little; Cupressus goveniana Gordon; Cupressus aromatica Gordon & Glend.; Cupressus attenuata Gordon & Glend.; Cupressus barkeri J.Dix; Cupressus bourgeaui Gordon; Cupressus californica Carrière; Cupressus cornuta Carrière; Cupressus goveniana var. attenuata (Gordon & Glend.) Carrière; Cupressus goveniana var. cornuta (Carrière) Carrière; Cupressus goveniana subsp. gibsonensis Silba; Cupressus goveniana var. glauca Carrière; Cupressus goveniana var. gracilis Carrière; Cupressus goveniana var. huberiana Carrière; Cupressus goveniana var. parva Lemmon; Cupressus goveniana var. pendula A.Henry; Cupressus goveniana var. viridis Carrière; Juniperus aromatica Carrière; Neocupressus goveniana (Gordon) de Laub.

= Hesperocyparis goveniana =

Species of conifer

Hesperocyparis goveniana, the Californian cypress or Gowen cypress, is a species of conifer in the cypress family, Cupressaceae, that is endemic to a small area of coastal California near Monterey.

== Distribution ==
The tree is endemic to the Monterey Peninsula in coastal Monterey County, located on the Central Coast of California, in the Western United States.

The tree is found in small, scattered populations, and not in large forests of its species. Hesperocyparis goveniana occurs with Hesperocyparis macrocarpa (Monterey cypress), in the two groves where the Monterey cypress occurs naturally, in Monterey County. Outside of California, Hesperocyparis goveniana has been introduced to Robinson Crusoe Island in Chile.

It is on the IUCN Red List of endangered species.

== Description ==
Hesperocyparis goveniana is a coniferous shrub or tree with a conic to ovoid-conic crown, very variable in size, with mature trees of under 1 m (3 ft 3 in) on some sites, to 50 m (160 ft) tall in ideal conditions.

The foliage grows in dense sprays, dark green to somewhat yellow-green in color. The leaves are scale-like, 2–5 mm (0.08–0.20 in) long, and produced on rounded (not flattened) shoots.

The seed cones are globose to oblong, 11–22 mm (0.43–0.87 in) long, with 6 to 10 scales, green at first, maturing brown or gray-brown about 20–24 months after pollination. The cones remain closed for many years, only opening after the parent tree is killed in a wildfire, thereby allowing the seeds to colonize the bare ground exposed by the fire. The male cones are 3–5 mm (0.12–0.20 in) long, and release pollen in February/March.

Typically, cones of H. goveniana are smaller than those of H. macrocarpa.

=== Taxonomy ===
Hesperocyparis goveniana was first described and given the scientific name Cupressus goveniana by George Gordon in 1849. It was described from a specimen grown in the gardens of the Royal Horticultural Society from seed collected by Karl Theodor Hartweg. It was named by Gordon for the then secretary of the society, James Robert Gowen. In 2009 genetic research into the relationships of Cupressus and Juniperus lead to the reclassification of almost all the new world species into a new genus, Hesperocyparis by Jim A. Bartel. This move has been disputed, but as of 2024 Plants of the World Online (POWO), World Flora Online (WFO), and the USDA Natural Resources Conservation Service PLANTS database (PLANTS) all list Hesperocyparis goveniana as the correct name.

The varieties or subspecies, formerly included under Cupressus goveniana include:

- Cupressus goveniana var. goveniana — reclassified as Hesperocyparis goveniana.

Monterey County, strictly coastal, within 3 km (1.9 mi) of the coast and below 200 m (660 ft) altitude. Foliage dark green, not rough, with leaf tips not spreading; cones globose.

- Cupressus goveniana var. pigmaea, reclassified as Hesperocyparis pygmaea — Mendocino cypress (vulnerable species).

Mendocino and Sonoma counties, coastal, within 10 km (6.2 mi) of the coast and below 500 m (1,600 ft) altitude.

- Cupressus goveniana var. abramsiana, reclassified as Hesperocyparis abramsiana — Santa Cruz cypress (endangered species).

Santa Cruz and San Mateo counties, in the Santa Cruz Mountains 10–20 km (6.2–12.4 mi) inland and at 300–760 m (980–2,490 ft) altitude. With yellow–green foliage slightly rough-textured from the acute and slightly spreading leaf tips; cones often oval.
