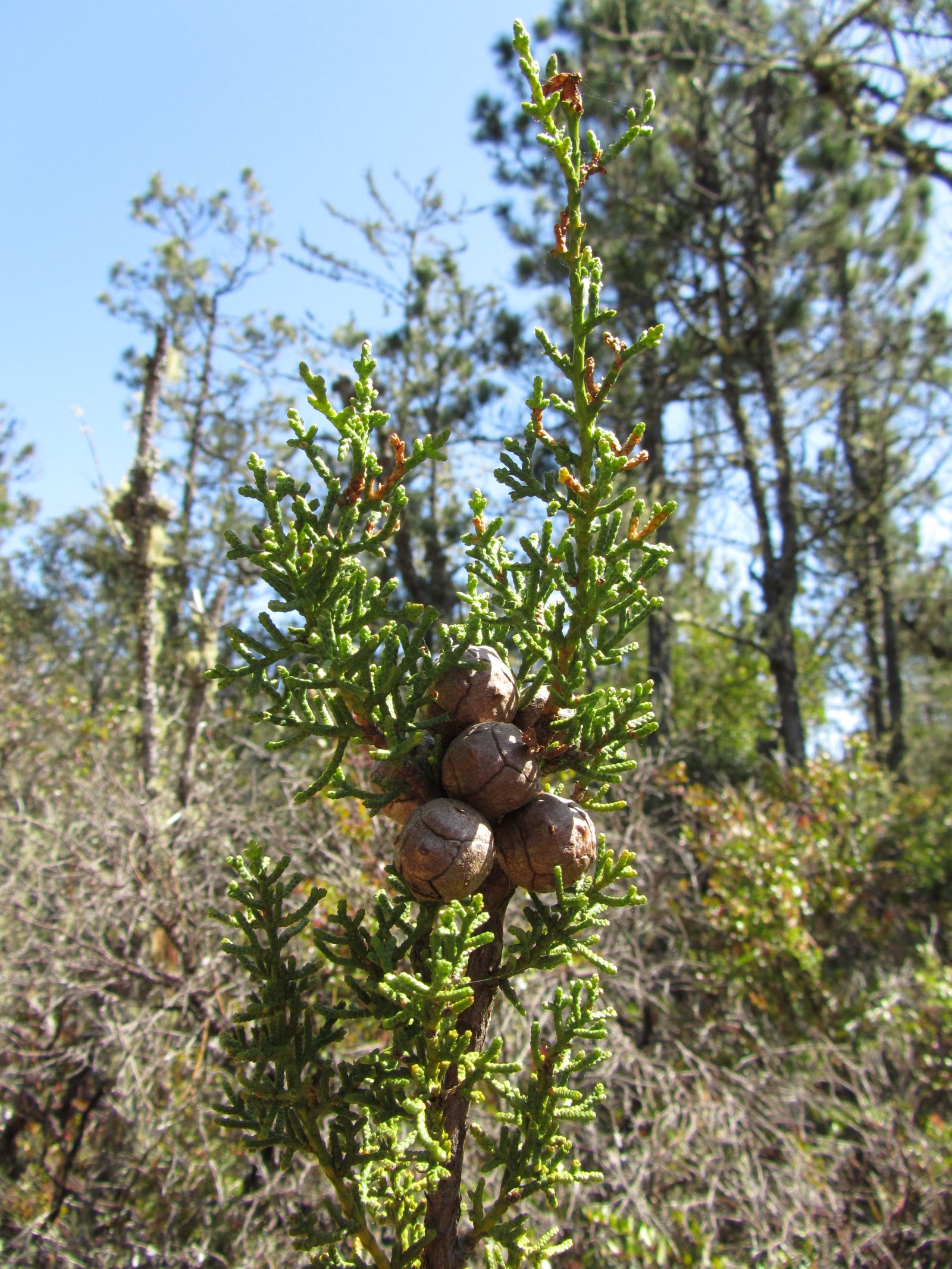
- Hesperocyparis pygmaea at Salt Point, Mendocino, California

Scientific classification
- Kingdom: Plantae
- Clade: Tracheophytes
- Clade: Gymnosperms
- Division: Pinophyta
- Class: Pinopsida
- Order: Cupressales
- Family: Cupressaceae
- Genus: Hesperocyparis
- Species: H. pygmaea

Binomial name
- Hesperocyparis pygmaea (Lemmon) Bartel
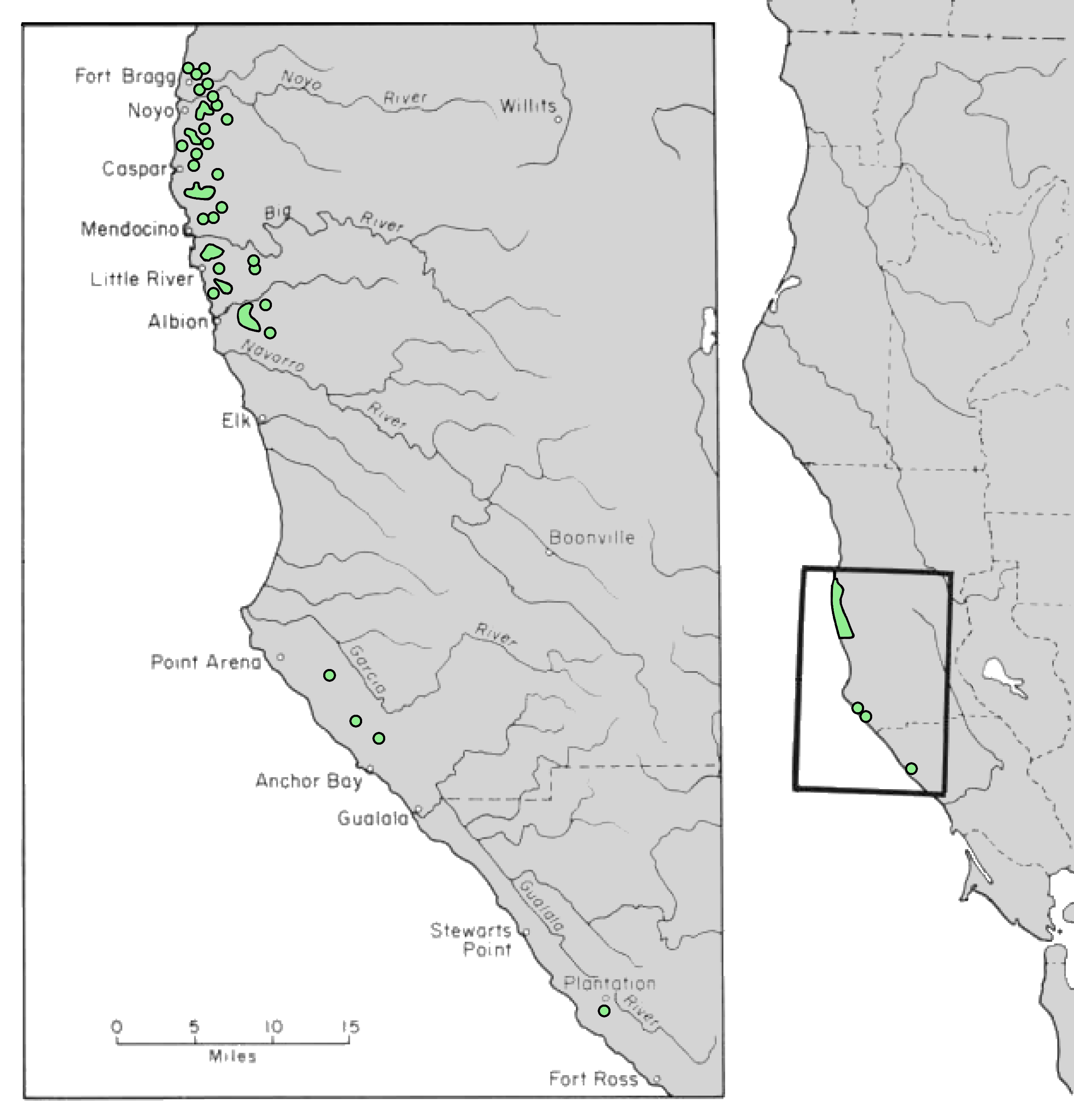
- Natural range of Cupressus pygmaea

Synonyms
- List: Callitropsis pygmaea (Lemmon) D.P.Little (2006); Cupressus goveniana subsp. pygmaea (Lemmon) Bartel (1991); Cupressus goveniana var. pygmaea Lemmon (1895); Cupressus pygmaea (Lemmon) Sarg. (1901); Cupressus silbae B.Huang bis (2008); Hesperocyparis goveniana var. pygmaea (Lemmon) de Laub. (2012); Neocupressus goveniana var. pygmaea (Lemmon) de Laub. (2009)

= Hesperocyparis pygmaea =

Californian species of western cypress

Hesperocyparis pygmaea, the Mendocino cypress or pygmy cypress, is a species of conifer of disputed status in the cypress family, Cupressaceae. It is endemic to certain coastal terraces and coastal mountain ranges of Mendocino and Sonoma Counties in northwestern California. It is a variable tree, and closely related to Hesperocyparis abramsiana and Hesperocyparis goveniana, enough to sometimes be considered conspecific with them.

== Description ==
The foliage is a dull dark to light green color, with scale-like leaves 1–1.5 mm long, with the leaf tips not spreading; seedlings bear needle-like leaves 8–10 mm long. The cones are small, 11–24 mm long, and almost spherical, with six or eight scales arranged in opposite decussate pairs, with the bract visible as no more than a small lump or short spine on the scale. The seeds are 3–5 mm long, with a pair of small wings along the sides. The cones remain closed on the trees for many years, until the trees are killed by a forest fire; after the tree is dead, the cones open to release the seeds which can then germinate successfully on the bare fire-cleared ground.

The Mendocino cypress differs little from H. goveniana in morphology, with the most conspicuous difference in herbarium material being the usually glossy black seeds, unlike the dull brown seeds of H. goveniana, but even this character is not constant, with dull brown seeds found in the southernmost populations of H. pygmaea near Point Arena. Preliminary genetic studies have shown some differences, with notably some plastid sequences (matK, rbcL, and trnL) suggesting a possible closer relationship to H. macrocarpa, though other sequences confirm its close relationship to H. goveniana. In cultivation together with H. goveniana, it retains a very different crown shape, with a tall slender crown, contrasting with the broad, shrubby crown of H. goveniana; it also has darker green foliage (paler, yellow-green in H. goveniana).

The largest recorded specimen is located in Mendocino County, with recorded dimensions of 43 m height, 2.13 m diameter, and 12 m crown spread, in 2000.

== Taxonomy ==
Hesperocyparis pygmaea was first described as a subspecies by J.G. Lemmon with the name Cupressus goveniana var. pygmaea in 1895. It was described as a species by Charles Sprague Sargent in 1901. Sargent thought that the distinctness of the seeds from those of C. goveniana definitively showed it to be a species though its growth habits and form did not make it easy to identify.

Its taxonomic status is a long standing matter of dispute between botanists. In the 20th century some treated Cupressus pygmaea as a distinct species, following Sargent, including Wolf (1948), Griffin & Critchfield (1976), and Lanner (1999). Others treated it within Cupressus goveniana as either a variety (C. goveniana var. pigmaea Lemmon) or a subspecies (C. goveniana subsp. pygmaea (Lemmon) A.Camus), including Camus (1914), and the Jepson Manual (1993), and one publication, the Flora of North America, did not distinguish it at all within C. goveniana.

The spelling of the scientific name has also been confused. Lemmon's protologue at varietal rank used the spelling pigm a, a typographic error hand corrected to pigmaea, in the main description (BHL page 23343470) but pygmaea in the contents (BHL page 23343396). In raising the taxon to species rank, Sargent changed the spelling to pygmaea (BHL page 28545470), a legitimate change as a botanical name has no priority outside of the rank at which it is published (ICN Art. 11.2); this has been followed by most subsequent authors (including Camus in the first allocation to subspecific rank ), though a few subsequent authors have incorrectly used the spelling pigmaea at ranks other than varietal (e.g. Farjon 2005, Little 2006).

Disputes continued into the 2000s with Farjon agreeing that it should be part of C. goveniana in 2005. Additionally moving the new world cypress species to different genera was proposed three different times. In 2006 Damon P. Little proposed moving them to Callitropsis, but did not find wide acceptance. In 2009 two different classifications were proposed, Hesperocyparis and Neocupressus.

As of 2024 Hesperocyparis pygmaea is listed as the correct name in Plants of the World Online, World Flora Online, and the Gymnosperm Database.

== Distribution and habitat ==
The Mendocino cypress is highly variable in growth form, depending on soil conditions. In the pygmy forest plant community on poor, acidic, nutrient-starved podsol soils with drainage impeded by an iron hardpan, it is a stunted tree from 0.2–5 meters in height at maturity. When occurring in its pygmy form, it is sometimes called pygmy cypress. When growing on deep, well-drained soils it can be a large tree up to 30–50 meters in height and 1–2.4 m in trunk diameter. The bark is dark gray-brown, with stringy texture, and fissured on old trees.

Mendocino cypress occurs in very limited ranges within only Mendocino County, on some of the historical lands of the Yuki Native American people. In Mendocino County the occurrence is in a discontinuous coastal terrace strip, primarily as a pygmy forest associated with bishop pine (Pinus muricata) and Mendocino shore pine (P. contorta var. bolanderi). Occurrences are typically below 500 m in elevation. The Mendocino County official soils survey states that "While not formally recognized as a major forest cover type, the coastal portion of the survey area also includes bishop pine and Mendocino cypress (pygmy) forest types".

== Productivity ==
Along the Mendocino coastal terraces, whose geological age is approximately one million years, studies have been conducted of the biomass density and primary productivity of the Hesperocyparis pygmaea-dominated pygmy forest. The terraces in this area extend a full five to ten kilometers inland from the Pacific Ocean.

In the Mendocino cypress pygmy forests, biomass was measured to range between 1.6 and 4.4 kilograms per square meter aboveground; moreover, net primary productivity was found to measure 180 to 360 grams per square meter per annum above the ground surface. Mean below-ground values are 3.5 kilograms biomass per square meter, productivity being 402 grams per meter per annum. The leaf-area ratio of the pygmy forest was estimated as 2.1 grams per square meter implying a high production efficiency per unit leaf area for an evergreen community (150 grams per meter aboveground). According to Westman, productivity of the H. pygmaea forest lies within the range expected for open, dry woodlands. A similar community for which data is available is a pygmy conifer-oak scrubland in southern Arizona.
