= James Robert Gowen =

James Robert Gowen (1784–1862) was an amateur English botanist and horticulturist, who was secretary of the Royal Horticultural Society (RHS) from 1845 to 1850, treasurer until 1855, a landowner in the Wairau Valley in 1848, was still paying rates in Nelson in 1862 and was a director of the New Zealand Company from 1840 to 1854. He was a lay member of the Lunacy Commission from 1842 to 1844 and patron of the Nelson Agricultural and Horticultural Society in 1845.

The RHS lists 12 rhododendron varieties created by Gowen between 1826 and 1842 at Highclere Castle, on the Berkshire-Hampshire border, the home of the second Earl of Carnarvon, who was RHS Vice-President from 1829 to 1833. James Carton was head gardener at Highclere. At the request of Gowen, Carton's Rhododendron, a variety bred in 1825 was named after the gardener, by Professor John Lindley. In 1831 Lindley also named Govenia orchids after Gowen. Gowen Cypress, a Monterey conifer, was named after him by the RHS foreman, George Gordon, in 1849.

From about 1848 Gowen lived in London, until between 1856 and 1858, when he moved to Codrington Place, Western Road, Brighton. The 1851 Census recorded a James Robt Gowen, who was 65 years old, unmarried and born in Bath. The Times of 31 May 1862 had an announcement that he died in Brighton on 26 May, aged 78.

The standard author abbreviation Gowen is used to indicate this person as the author when citing a botanical name.
