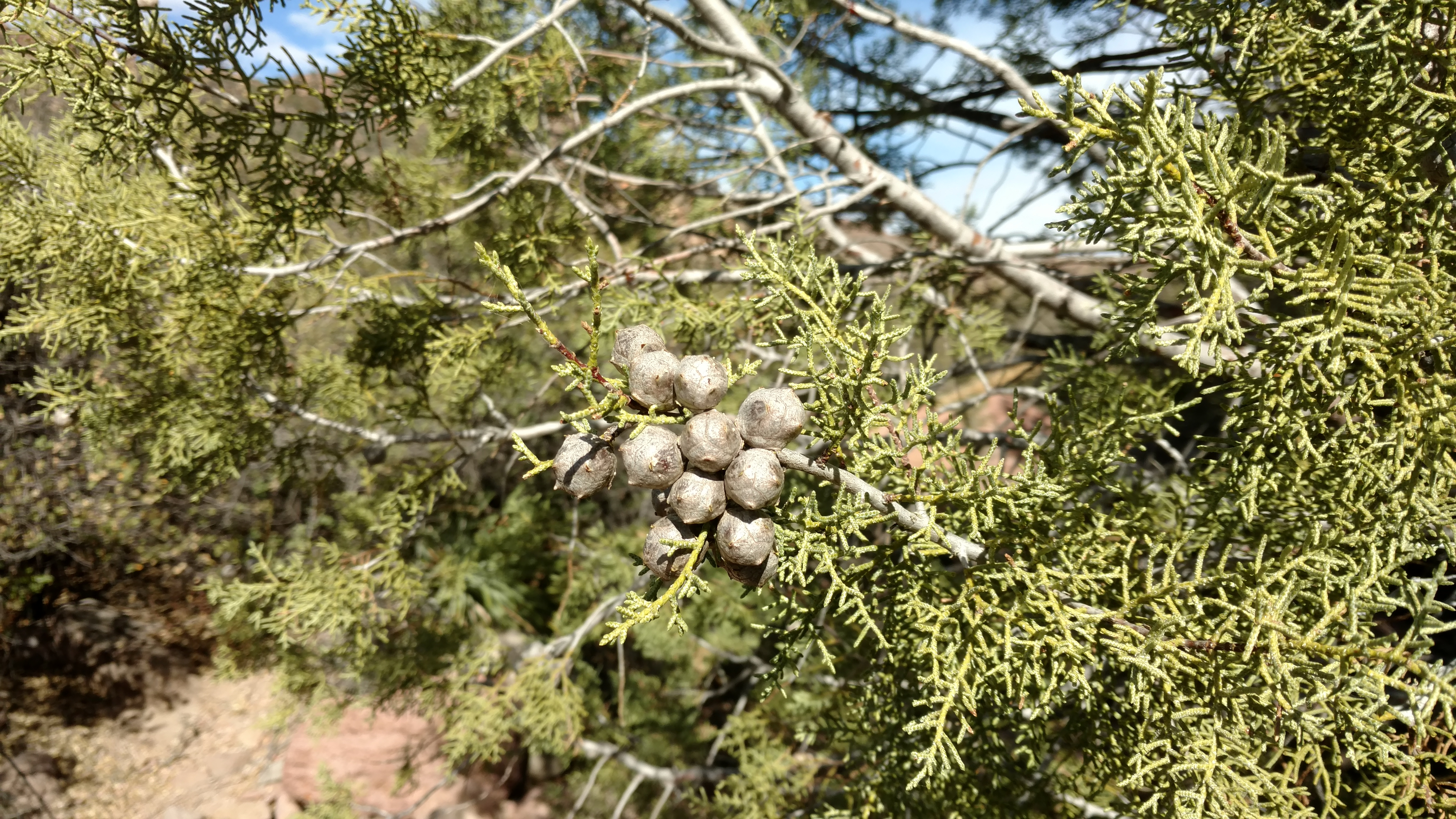

Scientific classification
- Kingdom: Plantae
- Clade: Tracheophytes
- Clade: Gymnosperms
- Division: Pinophyta
- Class: Pinopsida
- Order: Cupressales
- Family: Cupressaceae
- Genus: Hesperocyparis
- Species: H. revealiana

Binomial name
- Hesperocyparis revealiana (Silba) Silba 2009

Synonyms
- Cupressus arizonica subsp. revealiana (Silba) Silba 2005; Cupressus arizonica var. revealiana Silba 1981; Cupressus revealiana (Silba) Bisbee 2012

= Hesperocyparis revealiana =

Species of conifer

Hesperocyparis revealiana is a rare species of conifer in the cypress family, Cupressaceae. It is endemic to a small area of the State of Baja California in northwestern Mexico.

The type locality is the Rincón de Santa Catarina, in the Sierra de Juárez of the Peninsular Ranges System. It was previously assumed to be an isolated population of Cuyamaca cypress.

== Description ==
Hesperocyparis revealiana is a tree up to 10 meters (33 feet) tall. It has red scaly bark.

Male cones are 3–4 mm long. Female cones are 15–20 mm long.

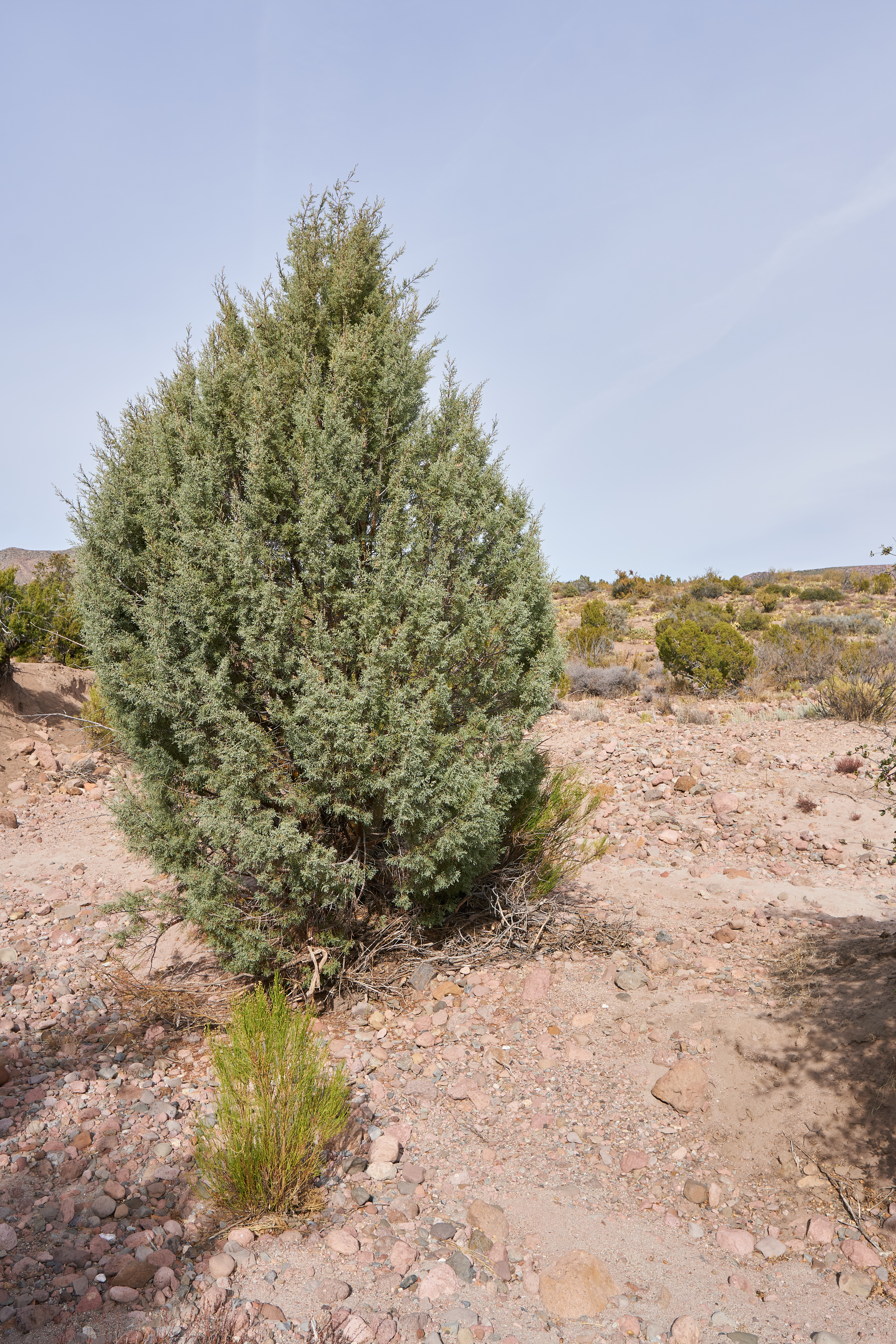
Growing in a wash several kilometers downstream of core habitat, elevation 1230m
