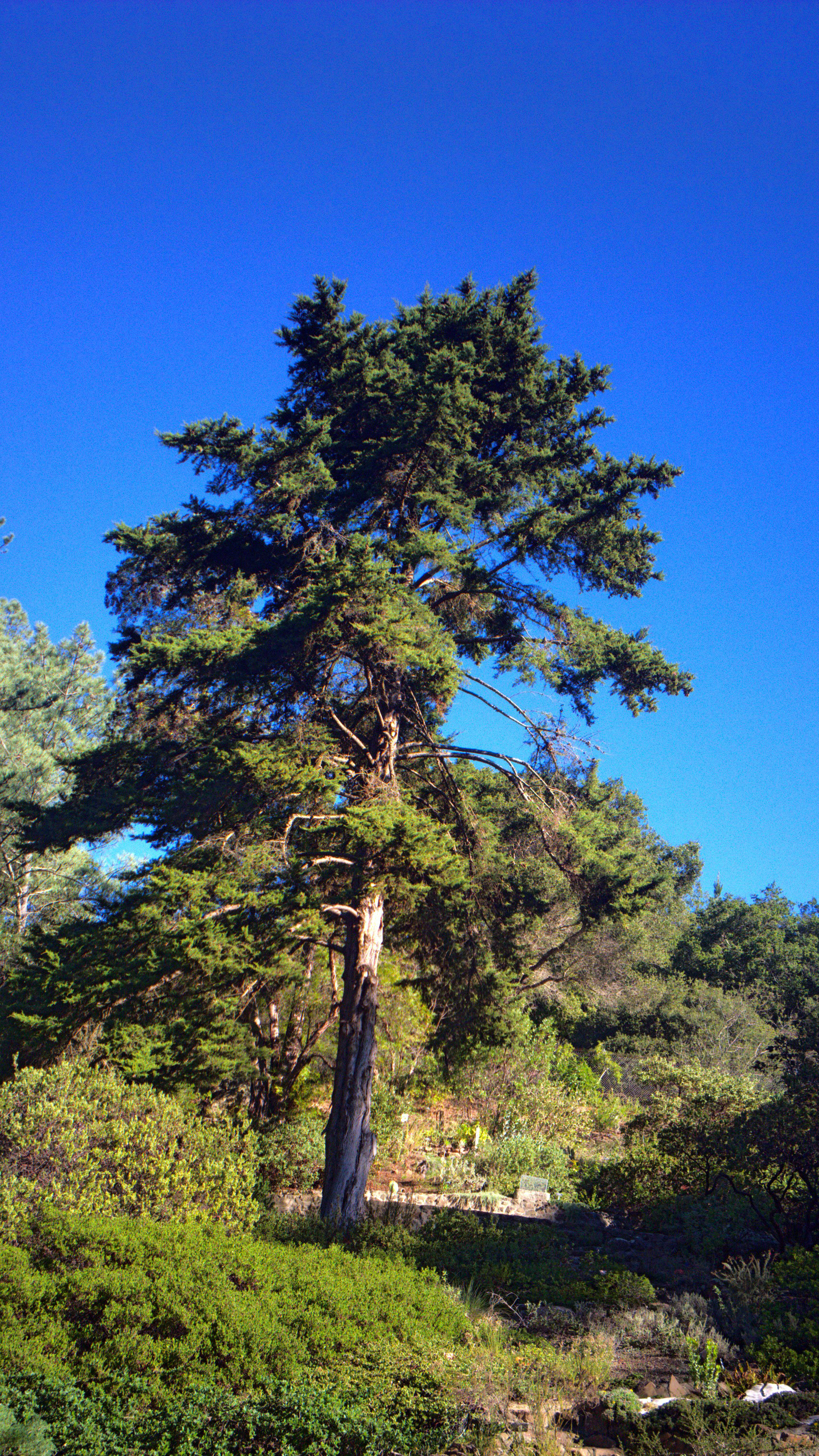
- At the Regional Parks Botanic Garden in Berkeley, California

Conservation status
- Critically Endangered (IUCN 3.1)

- Threatened (ESA)

Scientific classification
- Kingdom: Plantae
- Clade: Tracheophytes
- Clade: Gymnosperms
- Division: Pinophyta
- Class: Pinopsida
- Order: Cupressales
- Family: Cupressaceae
- Genus: Hesperocyparis
- Species: H. abramsiana

Binomial name
- Hesperocyparis abramsiana (C.B.Wolf) Bartel
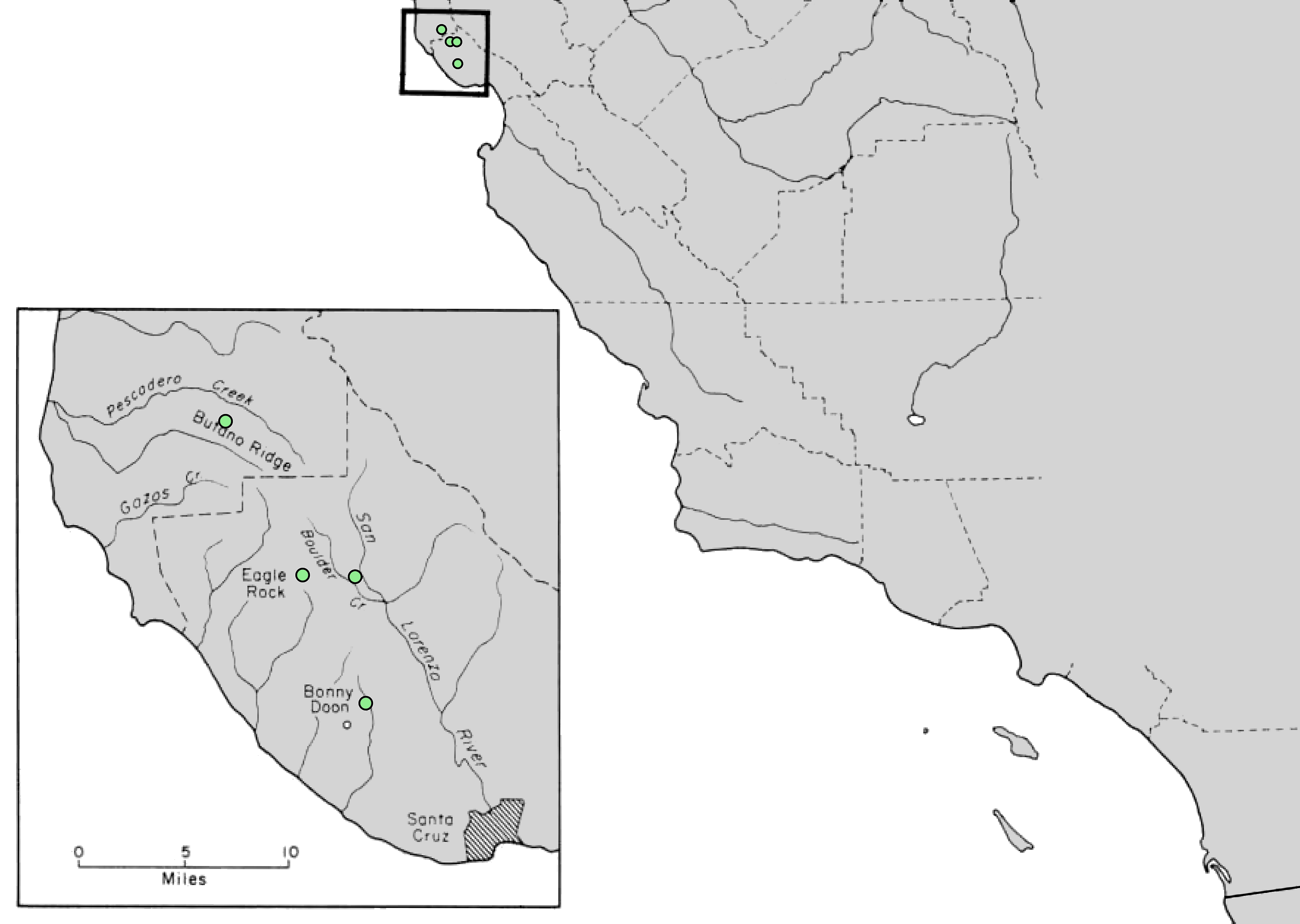
- Range map

Synonyms
- List: Callitropsis abramsiana (C.B.Wolf) D.P.Little (2006); Cupressus abramsiana C.B.Wolf (1948); Cupressus abramsiana subsp. butanoensis Silba (2003); Cupressus abramsiana subsp. locatellii Silba (2003); Cupressus abramsiana subsp. neolomondensis Silba (2003); Cupressus abramsiana subsp. opleri Silba (2003); Cupressus butanoensis (Silba) Malone & Bisbee (2012); Cupressus goveniana subsp. abramsiana (C.B.Wolf) A.E.Murray (1982); Cupressus goveniana var. abramsiana (C.B.Wolf) Little (1970); Hesperocyparis goveniana var. abramsiana (C.B.Wolf) de Laub. (2012); Neocupressus goveniana var. abramsiana (C.B.Wolf) de Laub. (2009); Hesperocyparis abramsiana var. butanoensis (Silba) Bartel & R.P.Adams (2009)

= Hesperocyparis abramsiana =

Santa Cruz cypress

Californian species of western cypress

Hesperocyparis abramsiana, the Santa Cruz cypress, is a species of coniferous tree in the cypress family. The species is endemic to the Santa Cruz Mountains within the Santa Cruz and San Mateo counties of west-central California. The U.S. Fish and Wildlife Service listed the species on the Endangered Species Act in 1987 due to increasing threats from habitat loss and disruption of natural forest fire regimes. In 2016, the conservation status of the Santa Cruz cypress changed to Threatened. The cited reasoning was a decrease in threats against their habitat.

== Physical description ==
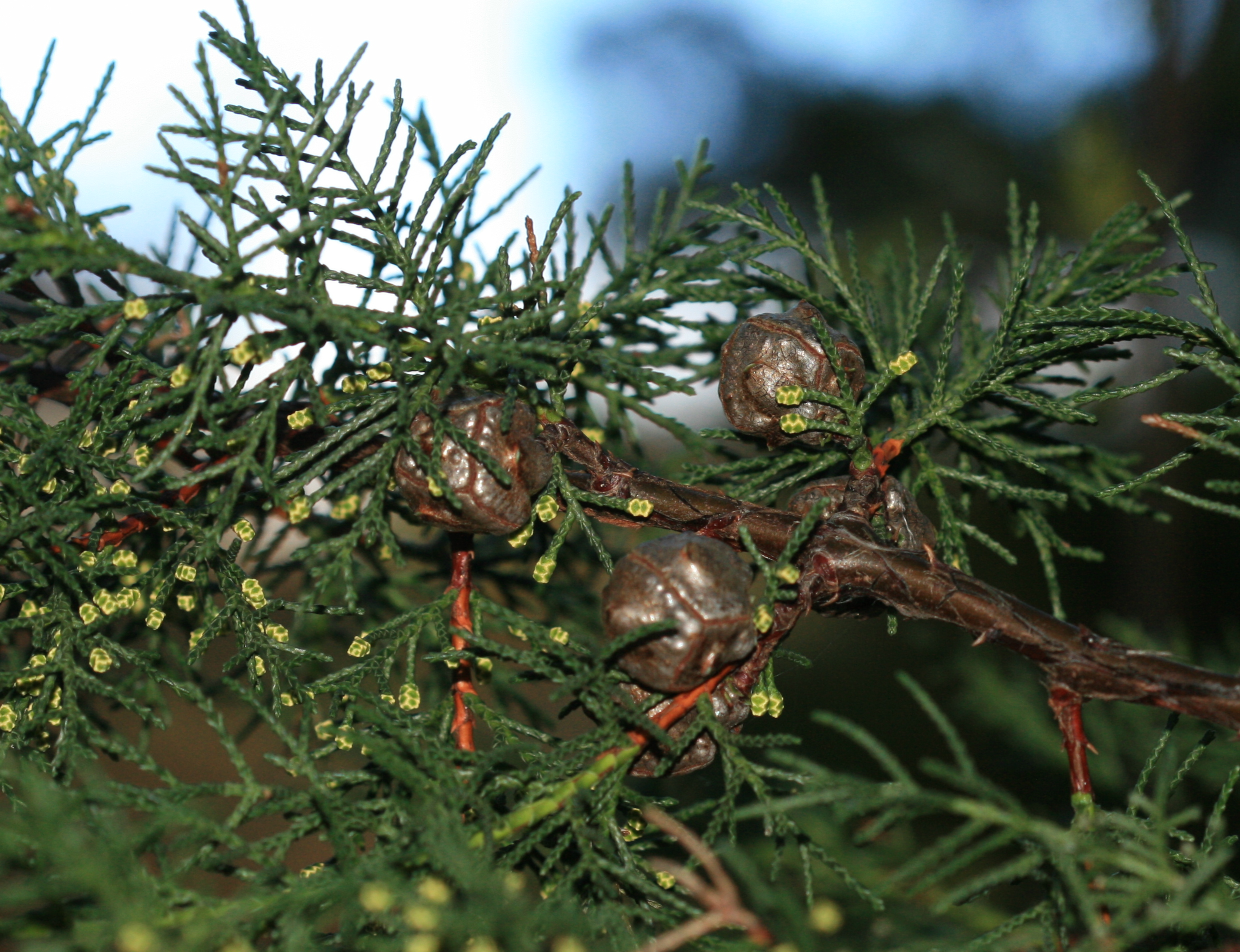
Close up of leaves as well as seed cones and pollen cones.

Individual trees can grow 10 to 25 meters tall with branches 5–10 cm in diameter covering the trunk to nearly the ground. The shape of the tree is pyramidal, with branches longer toward the base. The tree's leaves are light green and scale-like and can grow up to 15mm in length, persisting on branches for many years. The bark of the trunk is fibrous with thin grey vertical stripes. Individuals begin to produce cones at 11 years in age. Pollen cones can grow up to 4mm long and produce large amounts of pollen that spread in the wind. Female seed cones are produced annually on the tree and grow up to 20 to 30mm in diameter. They remain on the tree until the supporting branches die, typically as a result of natural fires. Individuals can live beyond 100 years, with one of the oldest individuals identified as being between 127 and 162 years old.

== Reproduction and phenology ==
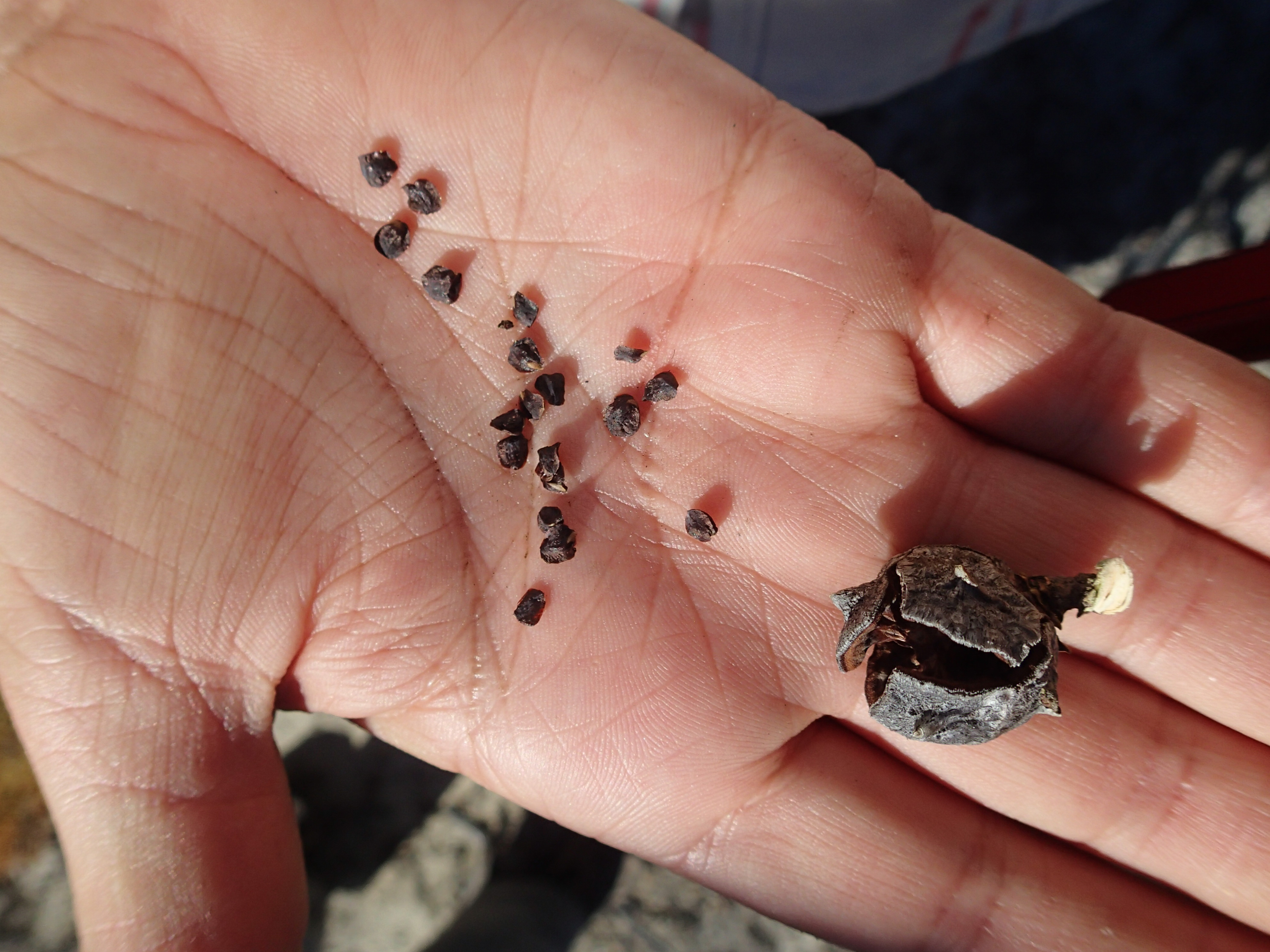
Close up of Santa Cruz cypress seeds.

The reproductive age of the Santa Cruz cypress is on average 11 years of age. Seed viability falls to 10 percent by the time a tree is 30 years old. Like some other coniferous trees, the seed-bearing cones of the Santa Cruz cypress depend on fire to heat open the cone and release the seeds. The fires burn the vegetation in the area, including the parent tree. The seeds of the cypress are then able to germinate without the competition of other plants in the area.

== Taxonomy ==
As with Hesperocyparis stephensonii, Hesperocyparis abramsiana was scientifically described for the first time in 1948 by Carl Brandt Wolf. The species was initially named Cupressus abramsiana. There was some uncertainty if it were best described as a species with papers being published in 1970 and 1982 classifying it as a variety or subspecies of Cupressus goveniana. Along with the other new world cypress species it was moved from Cupressus to the new genus Hesperocyparis in 2009.

As of 2024 Hesperocyparis abramsiana is considered the correct name for the species, with no subdivisions, by Plants of the World Online, World Flora Online, and the Gymnosperm Database.

=== Names ===
The species was named by Wolf to honor Dr LeRoy Abrams, a botanist at Stanford University. Abrams had also studied the trees with Wolf in 1937.

== Distribution ==
This species grows only in a 16 km^{2} (6.2 mi^{2} or 3954 acres) stretch of land in California. Within this range are five different localities with stands of the trees. The range covers parts of the Santa Cruz Mountains and the Santa Cruz and San Mateo counties. Historically, the populations had a much larger range, covering at least 76 km^{2} (30 mi^{2} or 19,200 acres). The estimated total population is less than 300 individuals, but abundance varies between localities. Some stands of the cypress only have a few individuals left.

One exceedingly rare type, the Butano cypress, exists in only one grove, of about 10 acres. This grove was described by William Dudley in the early 1900s. All of the adult trees died during the CZU Lightning Complex fires in 2020. Thousands of young Butano cypress seedlings were found growing in the grove in 2022.

== Ecology ==
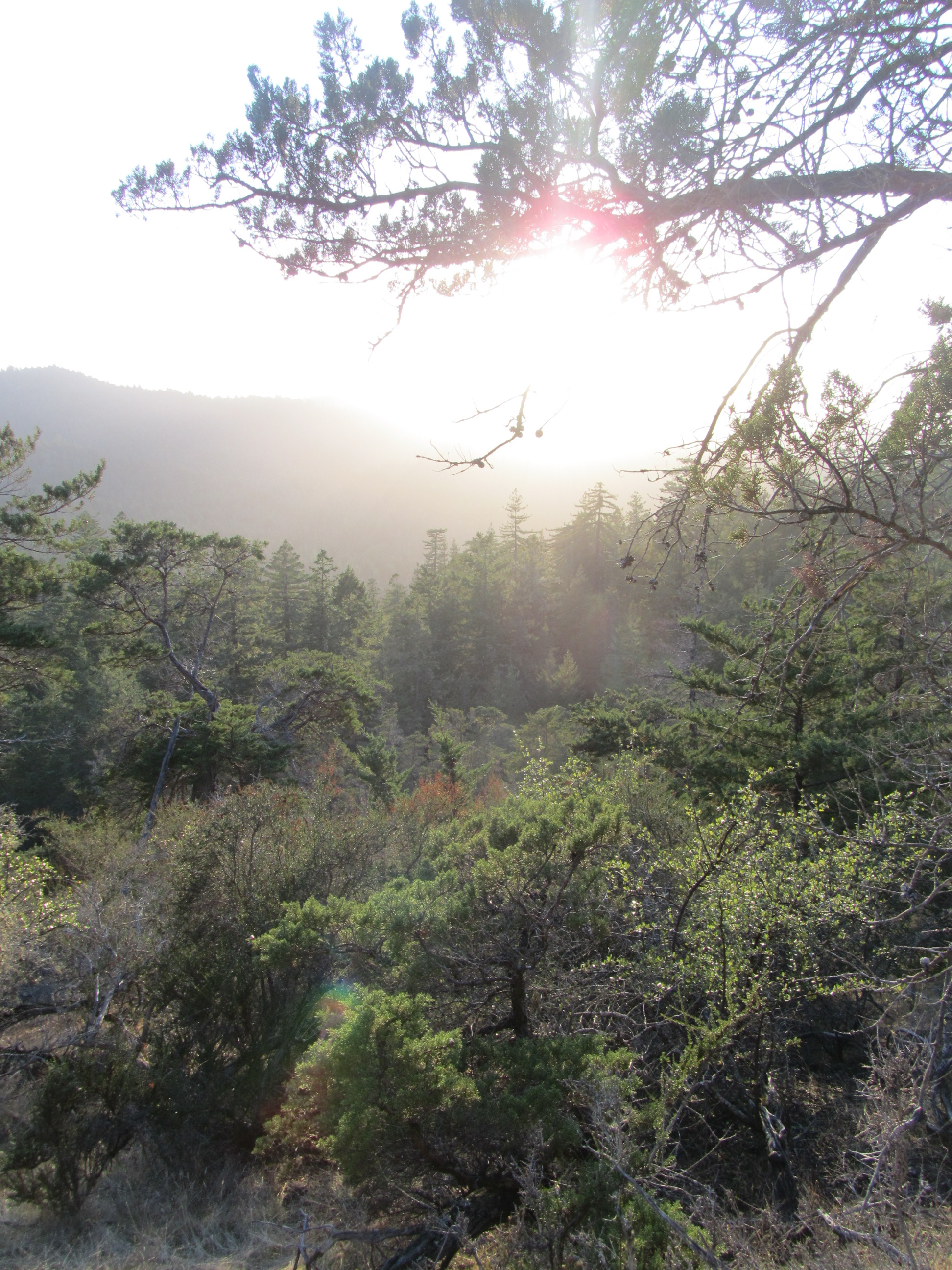
Santa Cruz Cypress natural habitat.

The habitat of the Santa Cruz cypress consists of the chaparral and closed-cone pine forest communities in the Santa Cruz Mountains. The habitat ranges from 300 to 750m in elevation, consisting of poorly developed sandstone or granitic soils. The climate of this area produces cool, wet winters and hot, dry summers, and natural fire regimes periodically destroy the vegetation in the area. The Santa Cruz cypress have evolved to be dependent on these fires for reproduction. The trees are obligate seeders, meaning they do not regenerate after burning up in a fire. Instead, the seeds germinate after the fire to minimal competition. They are then able to regenerate and grow the population. If fires are too frequent, seedlings will not be able to reach reproductive age. If fires are too infrequent, the trees do not reproduce often enough to maintain population size.

== Conservation status ==
The International Union for Conservation of Nature (IUCN) added the Santa Cruz cypress to the Red List in 1998 as endangered. In 2011, the IUCN updated the listing to critically endangered.

The U.S. Fish and Wildlife Service added the Santa Cruz cypress to the United States' Endangered Species Act (ESA) in 1987, listing it as endangered. In 2009, a 5-year review recommended the status lower from endangered to threatened. Following petitions from local cattle and agricultural organizations and reconsideration of the review, the U.S. Fish and Wildlife Service reclassified the tree as threatened in 2016. At the time of reclassification, there was a reported 33,000 to 44,000 individuals, compared to the 2,300 when the cypress was added to the Endangered Species Act.

== Current population threats ==
=== Alteration of fire regimes ===
The modern habitat of the Santa Cruz cypress no longer experiences fires at its natural frequency. Without disturbances like fire, the trees undergo little population growth and decreasing reproduction. Existing trees become post-reproductive and no longer produce viable seeds. Human-created fires can occur too often, destroying immature trees before reaching reproductive age. The U.S. Fish and Wildlife Service cited the altered fire regime as one of the most important threats to the populations.

=== Nonnative species ===
Nonnative species serve as competition and habitat modifiers that can limit cypress success. Acacia dealbata and Genista monspessulana impact Santa Cruz populations by blocking sunlight and by competing for soil space to germinate. More nonnative invasions are possible in the future due to the cypress' closeness to residential areas. The foot travel and human activities in these areas can bring more invasive species.

=== Genetic Introgression ===
In 2016, the conservation status of the Santa Cruz cypress was reduced to threatened. The cited reasoning was a decrease in threats against their habitat. However, a lengthy section of the 2016 federal report titled "Genetic introgression" (also known as introgressive hybridization) explains how the integrity of this species is also threatened by nearby horticultural plantings of a sister species, Monterey cypress, whose historically native range is nearby: on the opposite side of Monterey Bay. Hybridization is known to occur between the two endemics — as well as with a widely planted sister species native to Arizona: Arizona cypress. The ease of hybridization of cypress species in the American southwest has fostered a parallel history of taxonomic disagreements of where genus and species distinctions should apply. It thus provides a case study of neoendemism in conifers. As well, it illustrates an element of ongoing human impact — wind-dispersed pollen contamination from horticultural plantings — that cannot easily be corrected to meet conservation goals.

=== Additional threats ===
Another major human-derived threat to the species is climate change. Rising temperatures may push populations northwards, as well as further alter the fire regime. The species is also damaged by vandalism and unauthorized recreational activities. Actions like carving into bark damage the trees, encouraging infections and disease. In the past, the conversion of habitat into agricultural lands and residential areas was a major threat. But as populations became protected and preserved, the threat has since decreased.

== Current conservation efforts ==
The U.S. Fish and Wildlife Service released the first recovery plan for the Santa Cruz cypress in 1998. In 2009, the updated recovery plan recommended the reclassification of the species to threatened when protection for all five populations and their habitat is secured. Downlisting from endangered to threatened was authorized in the 2016 update of the recovery plan. The listed primary threats to control are logging, agricultural conversion, and development. The U.S. Fish and Wildlife Service lists all 3954 acres of habitat as a necessary/critical habitat in conserving the species. The plan also recommends delisting the species if all five populations experience long-term reproductive success. They provide insurance against failure by the availability of stored seeds. The plan also classified the Recovery Priority Number to a 6. This is the lowest priority and represents a species with low impact on human activities.

Updated resource-use plans and ordinances from the Santa Cruz and San Mateo counties currently protect some populations. More than half of all the individuals in the species occur on private lands owned by conservationists. State and county parks protect the remaining individuals. Watershed management plans have begun for some of these areas to aid in protections.
