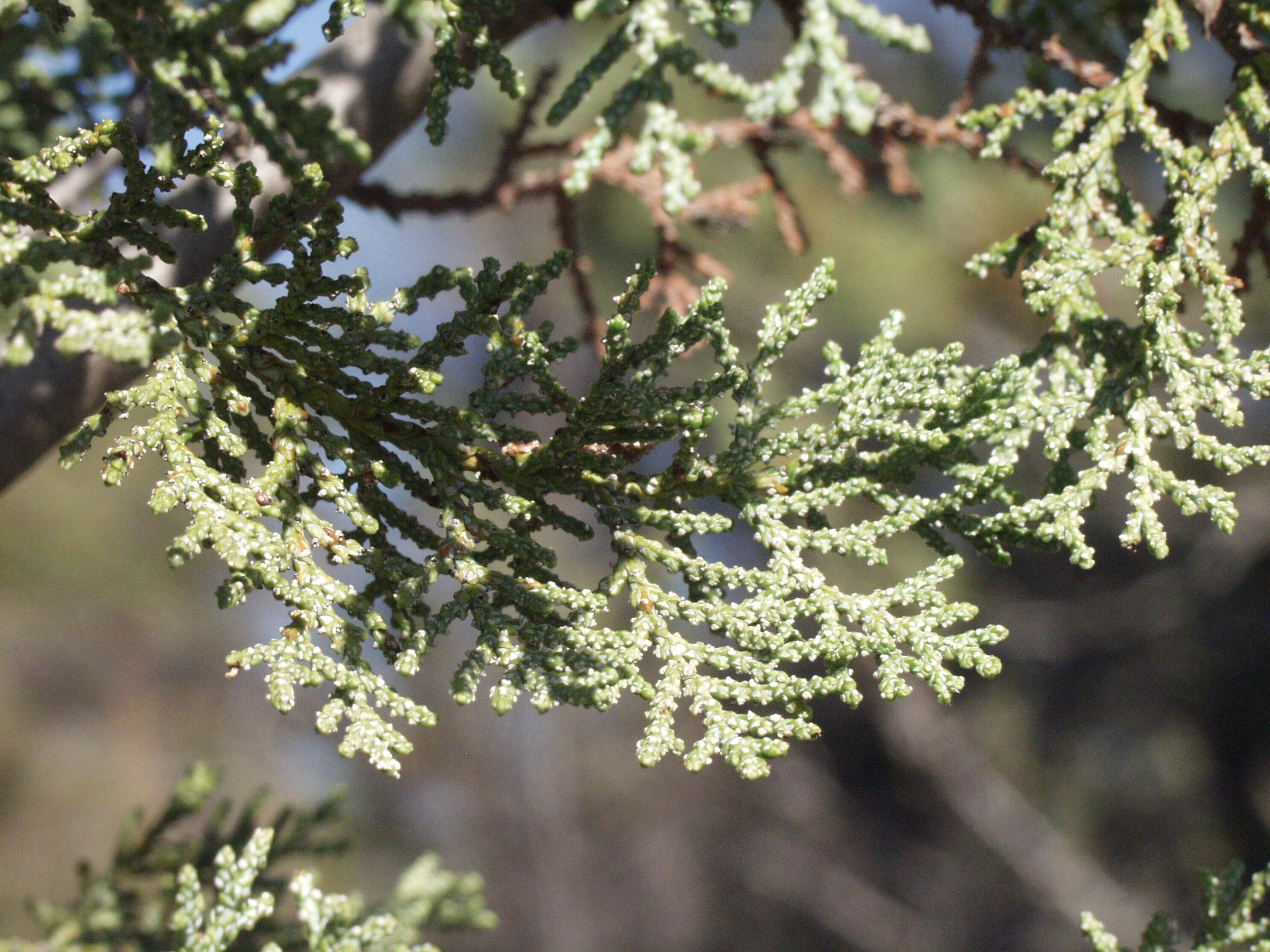
- Hesperocyparis macnabiana foliage

Conservation status
- Least Concern (IUCN 3.1)

- Apparently Secure (NatureServe)

Scientific classification
- Kingdom: Plantae
- Clade: Tracheophytes
- Clade: Gymnosperms
- Division: Pinophyta
- Class: Pinopsida
- Order: Cupressales
- Family: Cupressaceae
- Genus: Hesperocyparis
- Species: H. macnabiana

Binomial name
- Hesperocyparis macnabiana (A.Murray bis) Bartel
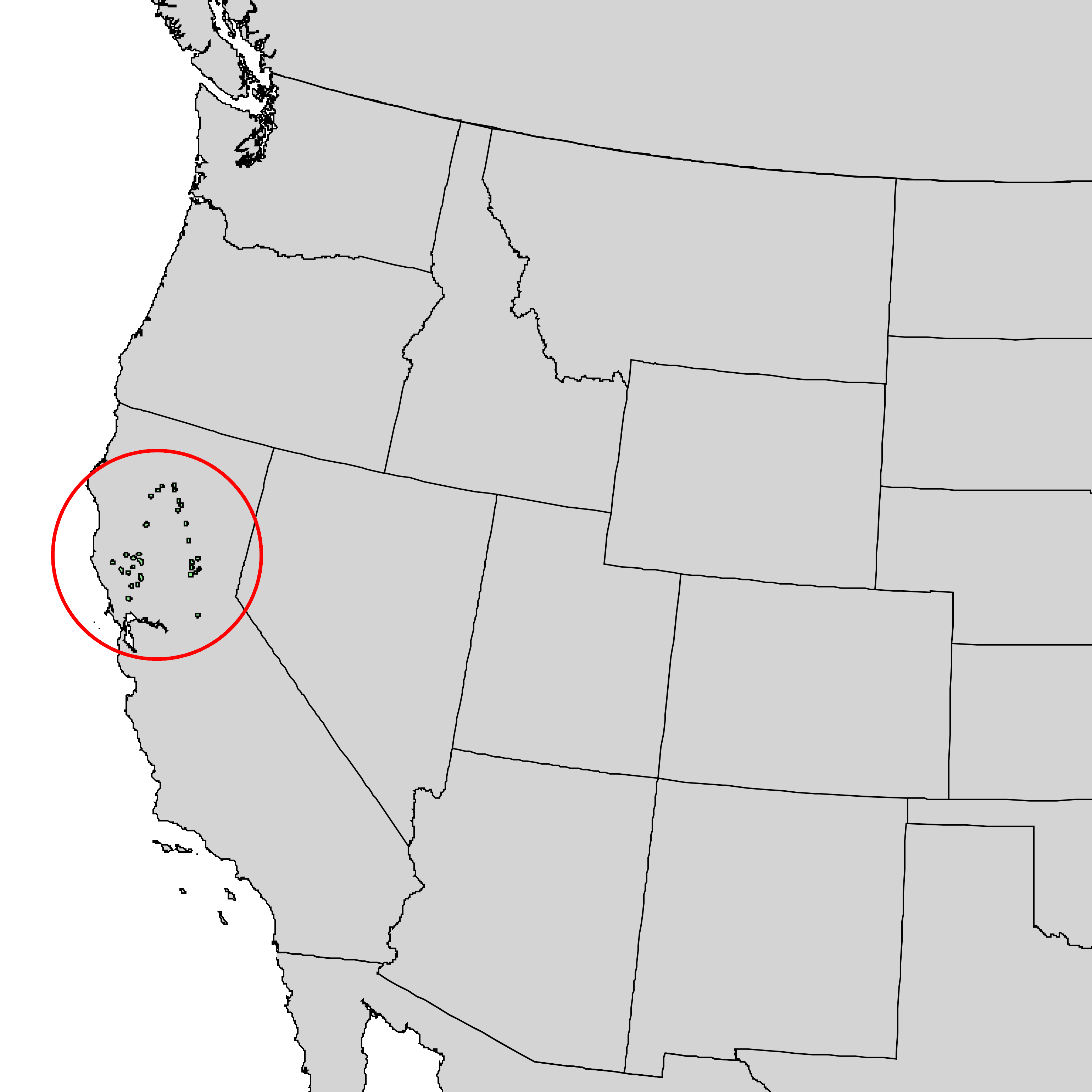
- Natural range
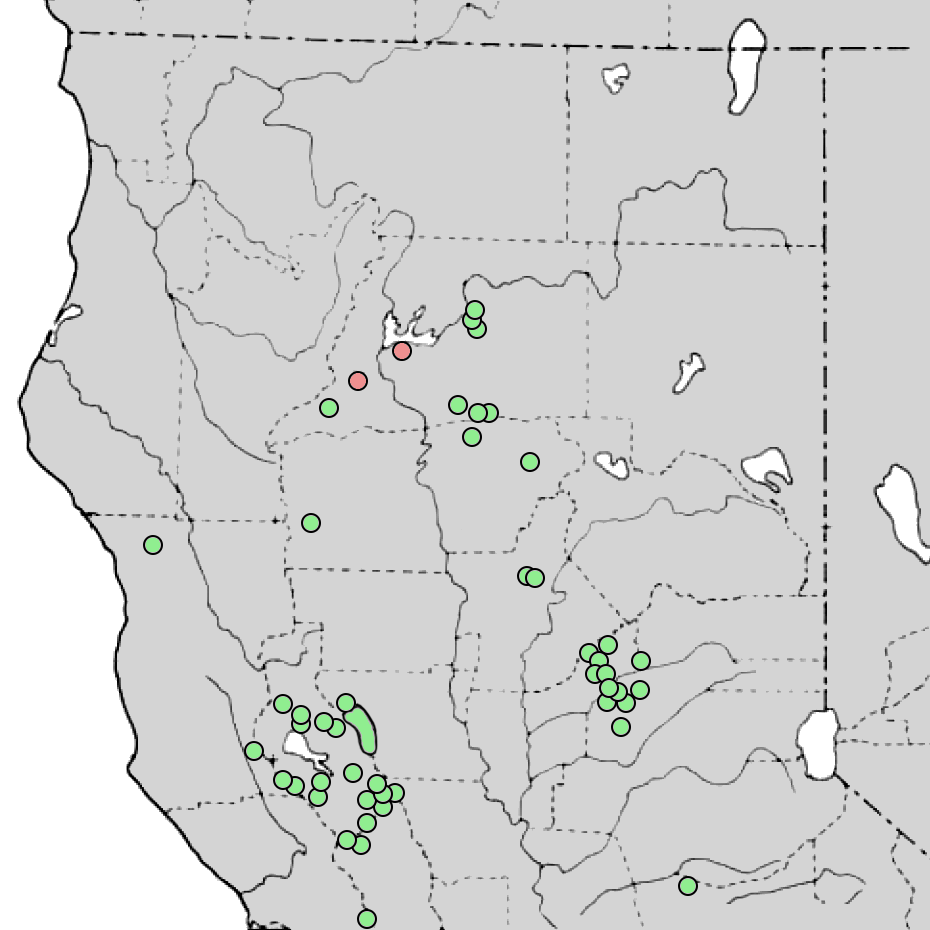
- (Red circles indicate extinct populations.)

Synonyms
- List: Cupressus glandulosa Hook. ex Gordon & Glend.; Callitropsis macnabiana (A.Murray bis) D.P.Little; Cupressus macnabiana A.Murray bis; Neocupressus macnabiana (A.Murray bis) de Laub.; Cupressus nabiana Mast.; Juniperus macnabiana P.Lawson ex Gordon & Glend.

= Hesperocyparis macnabiana =

Species of flowering plant

Hesperocyparis macnabiana, the MacNab cypress or Shasta cypress, is a species of conifer in the cypress family, Cupressaceae, endemic to California.

== Distribution ==
Hesperocyparis macnabiana is endemic to northern California. Hesperocyparis macnabiana is one of the most widely distributed of all the native California cypresses, found growing in chaparral, oak woodlands, and coniferous woodlands habitats along the inner northern California Coast Ranges and the foothills of the northern Sierra Nevada. MacNab cypress is often associated with ultramafic soils.

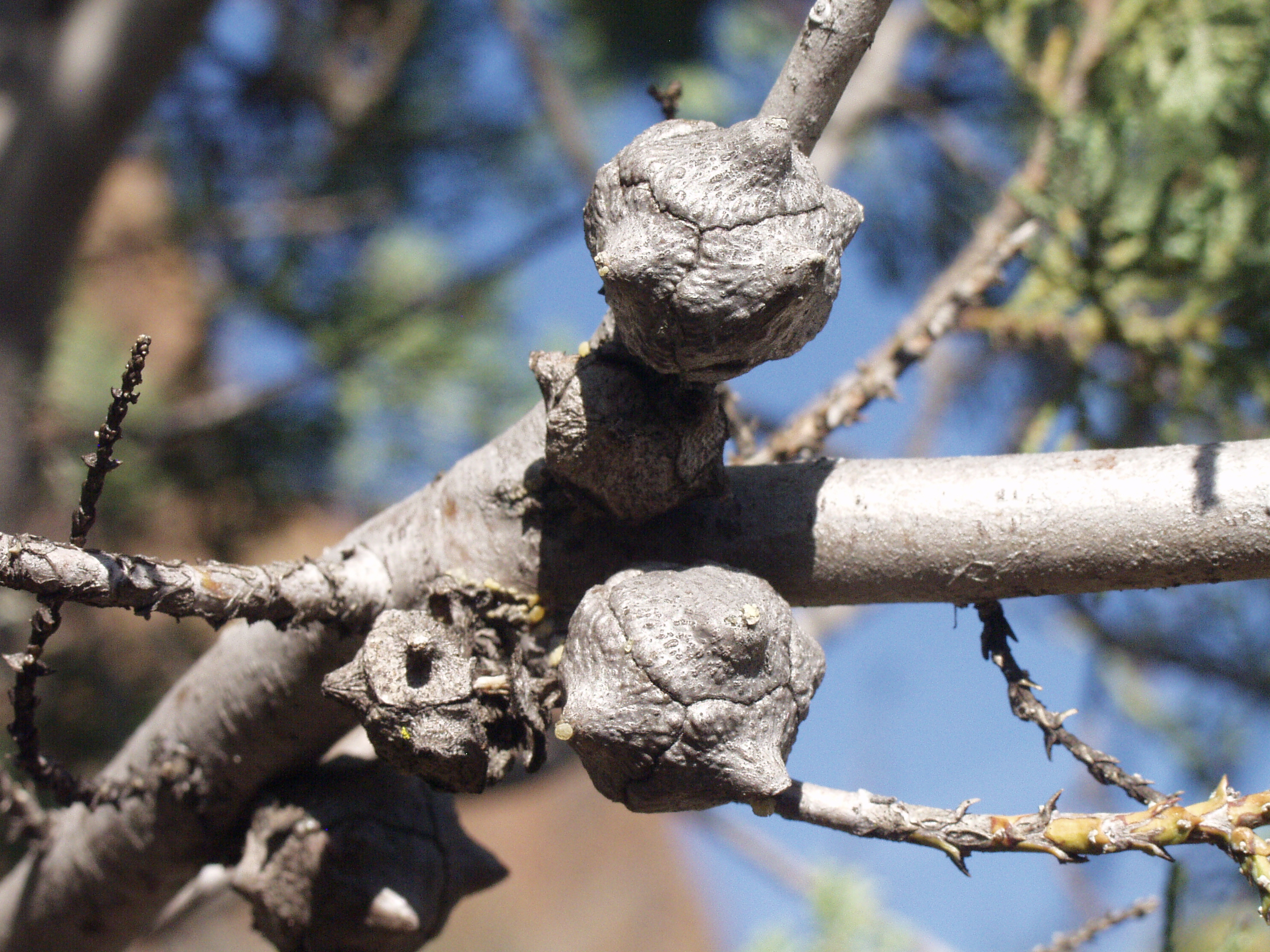
note prominent "horns" (umbos) on top two cone bracts

== Description ==
Hesperocyparis macnabiana is a coniferous shrub or small tree, 3–12 metres (9.8–39.4 ft) (rarely to 17 metres (56 ft)) tall, with a spreading crown that is often broader than it is tall. The foliage is produced in dense, short flat sprays (unlike most other California cypresses, which do not have flattened sprays), bright glaucous gray-green, with a strong spicy-resinous scent. The leaves are scale-like, 1–2 mm long with an acute apex, and a conspicuous white resin gland on the center of the leaf. Young seedlings produce needle-like leaves up to 10 mm (0.4 inches) long in their first year.

The seed cones are oblong-ovoid to cuboid, 15–25 mm long and 13–20 mm broad, with six (rarely four or eight) scales, each scale bearing a prominent umbo; they are strongly serotinous, not opening to release the seeds until the parent tree is killed by wildfire. This enables heavy seed release to colonize the bare, fire-cleared ground. The pollen cones are 3–4 mm long, and release their pollen in the fall.

== Taxonomy ==
Hesperocyparis macnabiana was given its first scientific description in 1855 by the naturalist Andrew Murray under the name Cupressus macnabiana. It was named after William Ramsay McNab of the Royal Botanic Garden Edinburgh the suggestion of Murray's brother, William Murray. As part of spiting the new world cypress species into the new genus Hesperocyparis it was moved out of Cupressus by Jim A. Bartel in 2009. This split has not been universally accepted, but as of 2024 Plants of the World Online (POWO) and World Flora Online (WFO) both list the new classification as accepted.

== See also ==
- California interior chaparral and woodlands- (subecoregion)
- Fire ecology
