= Hartweg =

Hartweg is a surname. Notable people with the surname include:

- Karl Theodor Hartweg (1812–1871), German botanist
- Niklas Hartweg (born 2000), Swiss biathlete
- Norman Edouard Hartweg (1904–1964), American herpetologist
