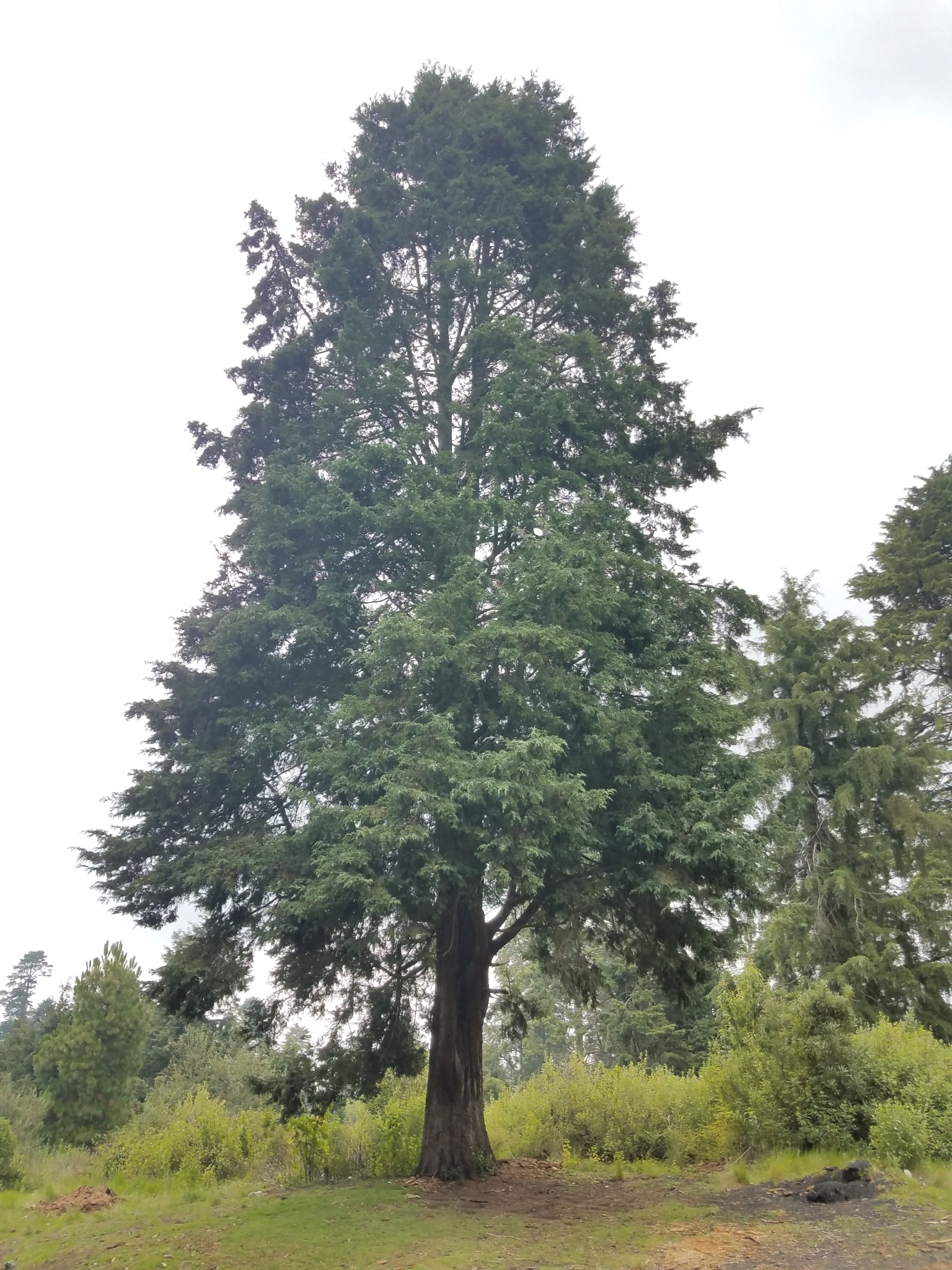
- Hesperocyparis benthamii tree in Mexico State, Mexico

Scientific classification
- Kingdom: Plantae
- Clade: Tracheophytes
- Clade: Gymnosperms
- Division: Pinophyta
- Class: Pinopsida
- Order: Cupressales
- Family: Cupressaceae
- Genus: Hesperocyparis
- Species: H. benthamii

Binomial name
- Hesperocyparis benthamii (Endl.) Bartel

Synonyms
- List: Callitropsis benthamii (Endl.) D.P.Little (2006); Cupressus benthamii Endl. (1847); Cupressus benthamii var. knightiana (Duch.) Mast. (1896); Cupressus ehrenbergii Kunze (1847); Cupressus knightiana Duch. (1855); Cupressus lindleyi subsp. benthamii (Endl.) Silba (2005); Cupressus lusitanica var. benthamii (Endl.) Carrière (1867); Cupressus lusitanica subsp. benthamii (Endl.) Franco (1945); Cupressus lusitanica var. knightiana (Duch.) Rehder (1919)

= Hesperocyparis benthamii =

Mexican species of western cypress

Hesperocyparis benthamii is a species of conifer in the cypress family, Cupressaceae. It is native to Mexico.

== Taxonomy ==
Hesperocyparis benthamii was scientifically described by the Austrian botanist Stephan Endlicher in 1847 and given the scientific name Cupressus benthamii. It has at times been considered a subspecies of what was then known as Cupressus lusitanica. As of 2024 it is listed as a species in the genus Hesperocyparis, the western cypresses, by Plants of the World Online and World Flora Online.
