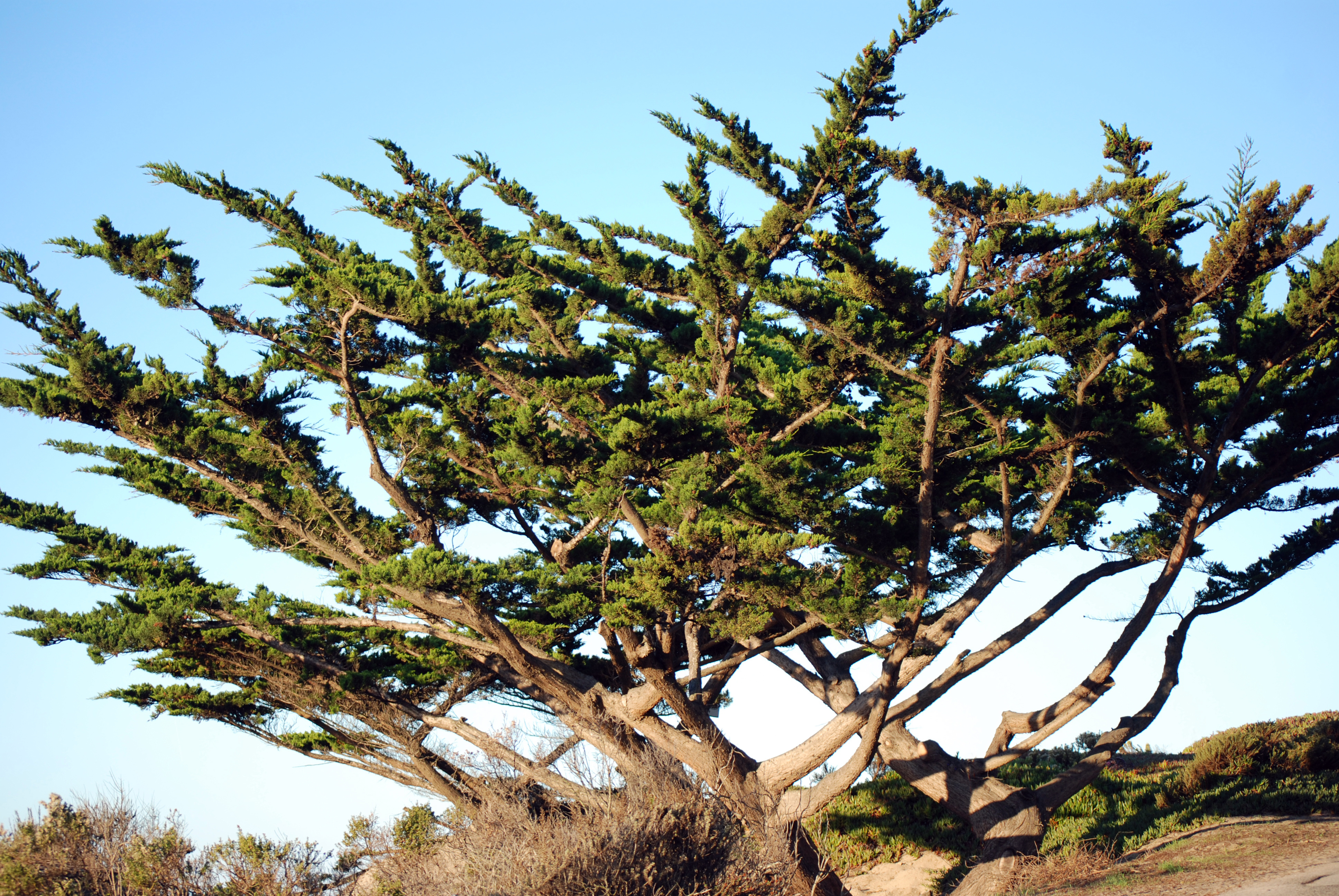
- Hesperocyparis macrocarpa, Monterey cypress

Scientific classification
- Kingdom: Plantae
- Clade: Embryophytes
- Clade: Tracheophytes
- Clade: Gymnosperms
- Division: Pinophyta
- Class: Pinopsida
- Order: Cupressales
- Family: Cupressaceae
- Subfamily: Cupressoideae
- Genus: Hesperocyparis; Bartel & R.A. Price

Type species
- Hesperocyparis macrocarpa (Hartweg ex Gordon) Bartel & Price

Species
- See text

Synonyms
- Neocupressus de Laub. nom. superfl.

= Hesperocyparis =

Genus of conifers

Hesperocyparis (western cypress) is a genus of coniferous trees in the cypress family, Cupressaceae, containing North American species beforehand assigned to the genus Cupressus. They are found throughout western North America. Only a few species have wide ranges, with most being restricted-range endemics.

== Taxonomy ==
Members of Hesperocyparis were and still are placed in Cupressus by many authorities, but phylogenetic evidence supports a different affinity. A 2021 molecular study found Hesperocyparis to be the sister group to the genus Callitropsis (containing only the Nootka cypress), with this clade being sister to the Asian genus Xanthocyparis, containing only the Vietnamese golden cypress. The clade comprising all three genera was found to be sister to a clade containing Juniperus and Cupressus sensu stricto. If Hesperocyparis and the other smaller genera were reunited with Cupressus it may also require them to be merged into a larger genus including Juniperus.

As of 2024 Hesperocyparis is listed as the correct classification by Plants of the World Online, World Flora Online, and the Gymnosperm Database. There is disagreement about this classification, with some scientists continuing to use Cupressus in preference to Hesperocyparis.

At the species level there is also uncertainty as to the number of species. In part this is because the north west of Mexico has not been sufficiently surveyed to give enough information to definitively determine if a number of species there and in the southwestern United States are fully separate species or part of a species complex.

=== Phylogeny ===
Stull et al. 2021

- - Juniperus
  - - Cupressus s.l.
      - Cupressus s.s.
      - - Xanthocyparis vietnamensis Farjon & Nguyên
        - - Callitropsis nootkatensis (Don) Oersted
          - - Hesperocyparis
              - H. bakeri (Jepson) Bartel (Modoc cypress)
              - - - H. macnabiana (Murray) Bartel (Macnab’s/Shasta cypress)
                  - - H. goveniana (Gordon) Bartel (Gowen cypress)
                    - - H. macrocarpa (Hartweg ex Gordon) Bartel (Monterey cypress)
                      - H. sargentii Jepson (Sargent cypress)
                - - H. glabra (Sudworth) Bartel (Smooth Arizona cypress)
                  - - H. arizonica (Greene) Bartel (Arizona cypress)
                    - - H. guadalupensis (Watson) Bartel (Guadalupe cypress)
                      - - H. montana (Wiggins) Bartel (San Pedro Martir cypress)
                        - - H. forbesii (Jepson) Bartel (Tecate cypress)
                          - - H. lusitanica (Miller) Bartel (Mexican cypress)
                            - H. stephensonii (Jepson) Bartel (Cuyamaca cypress)

Additional species:

- Hesperocyparis abramsiana (C. B. Wolf) Bartel (Santa Cruz cypress)
- Hesperocyparis benthamii (Endl.) Bartel
- Hesperocyparis nevadensis (Abrams) Bartel (Piute cypress)
- Hesperocyparis pygmaea (Lemmon) Bartel (Mendocino cypress)
- Hesperocyparis revealiana (Silba) Silba
