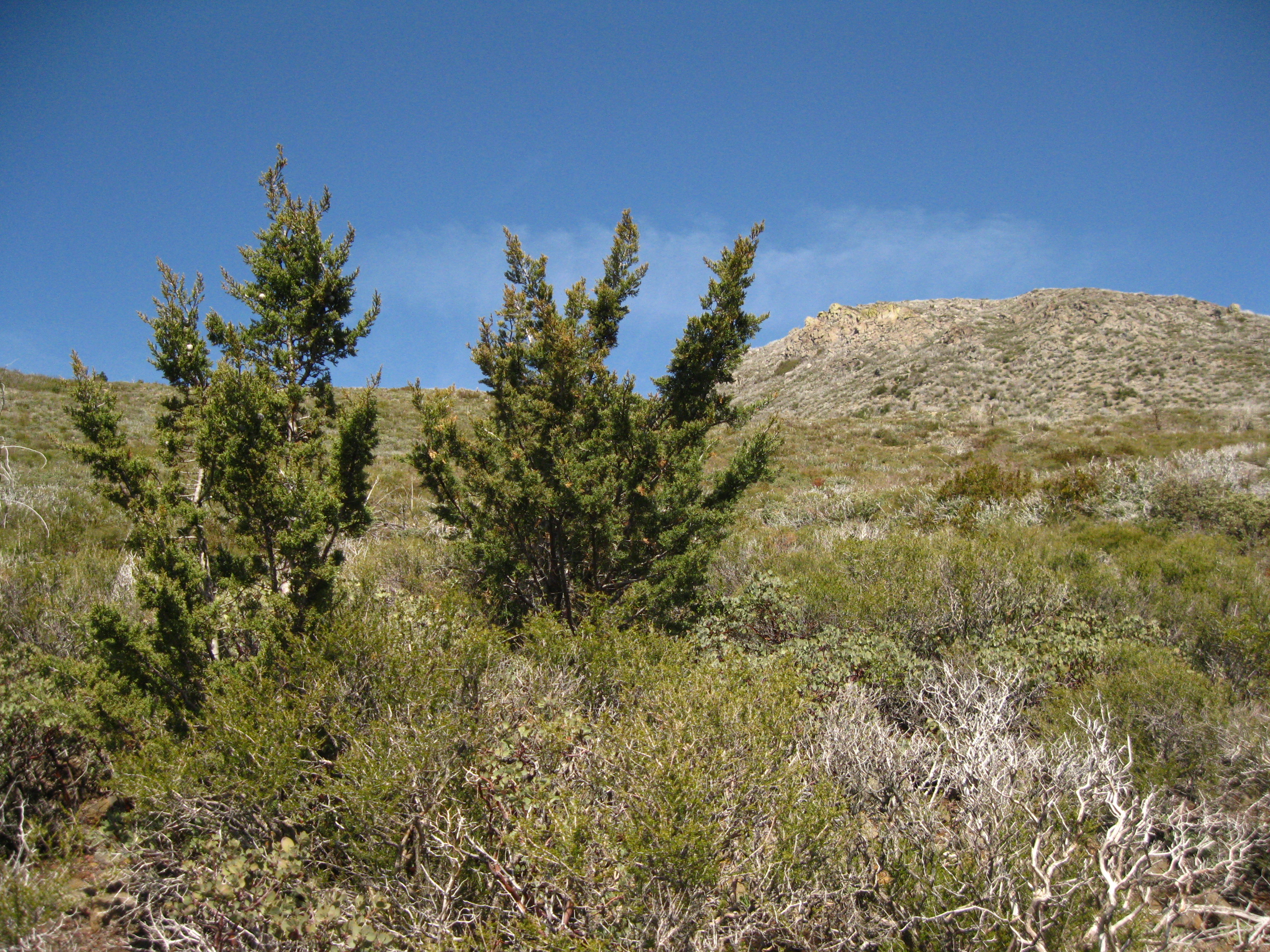

Conservation status
- Critically Endangered (IUCN 3.1)

Scientific classification
- Kingdom: Plantae
- Clade: Tracheophytes
- Clade: Gymnosperms
- Division: Pinophyta
- Class: Pinopsida
- Order: Cupressales
- Family: Cupressaceae
- Genus: Hesperocyparis
- Species: H. stephensonii

Binomial name
- Hesperocyparis stephensonii (C.B.Wolf) Bartel
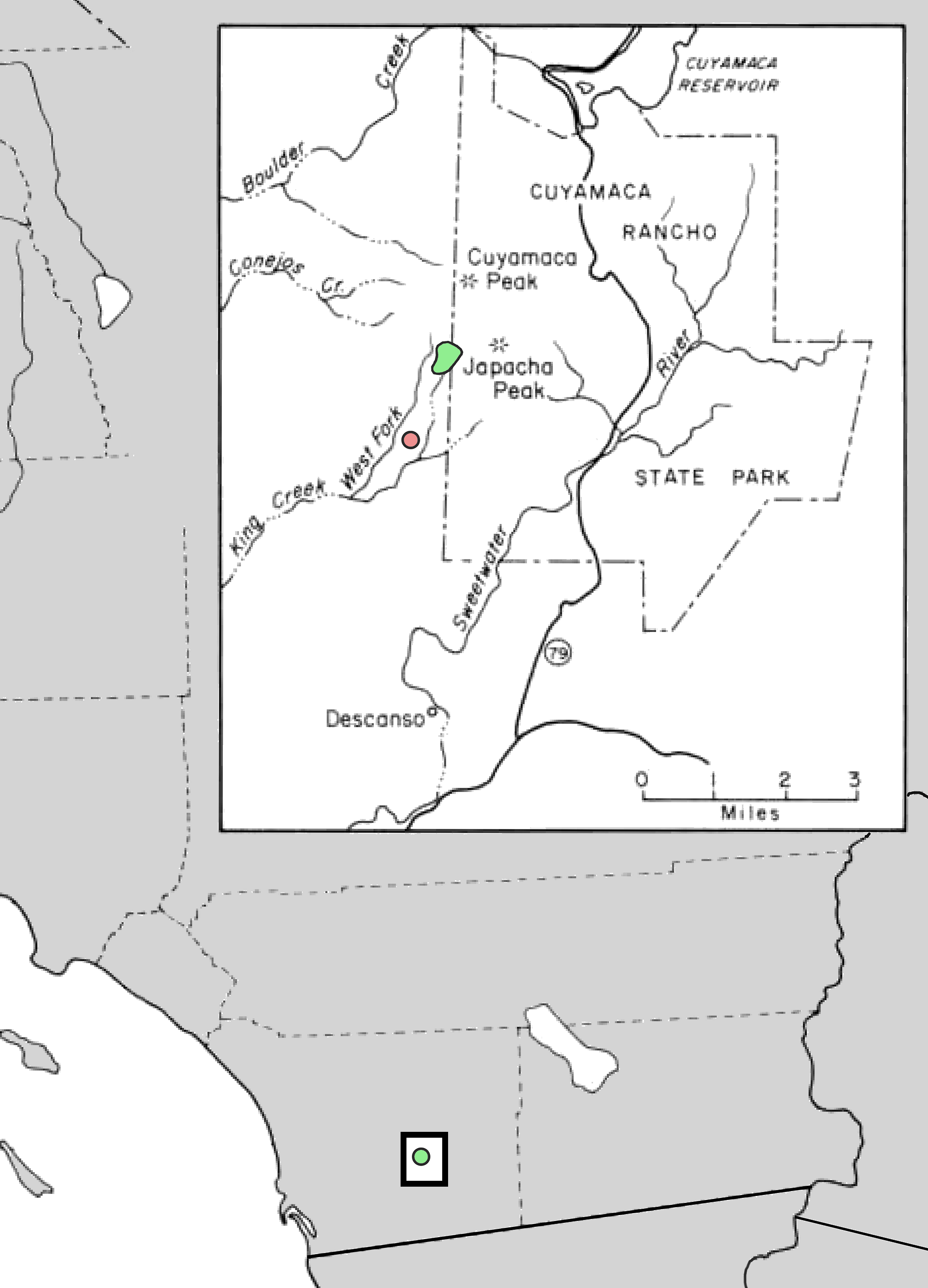
- Natural range of Hesperocyparis stephensonii

Synonyms
- Callitropsis stephensonii (C.B.Wolf) D.P.Little (2006); Cupressus arizonica var. stephensonii (C.B.Wolf) Little (1966); Cupressus arizonica subsp. stephensonii (C.B.Wolf) A.E.Murray (1982); Cupressus stephensonii C.B.Wolf (1948)

= Hesperocyparis stephensonii =

Californian species of western cypress

Hesperocyparis stephensonii, the Cuyamaca cypress, is a species of conifer in the cypress family, Cupressaceae, that is found only in one very small area in Southern California.

== Distribution ==
The Cuyamaca Cypress only verifiably exists in the headwaters area of King Creek in the Cuyamaca Mountains of the Peninsular Ranges system, south of Cuyamaca Peak within San Diego County in extreme Southern California.

Trees were reported growing as low as 3,000 feet (910 m) in elevation in 1998, but the presence of these individuals today has not been verified. Most individual trees occur at 4,500–5,100 feet (1,400–1,600 m) within the Pacific Southwest Research Station's King Creek Research Natural Area, in the Cleveland National Forest.

=== Conservation ===
It is an IUCN Red List Critically Endangered species, and a California Native Plant Society Inventory of Rare and Endangered Plants listed Seriously endangered species. The entire native (world) population of the tree was reduced down to thirty to forty individual trees by the 2003 Cedar Fire.

== Description ==
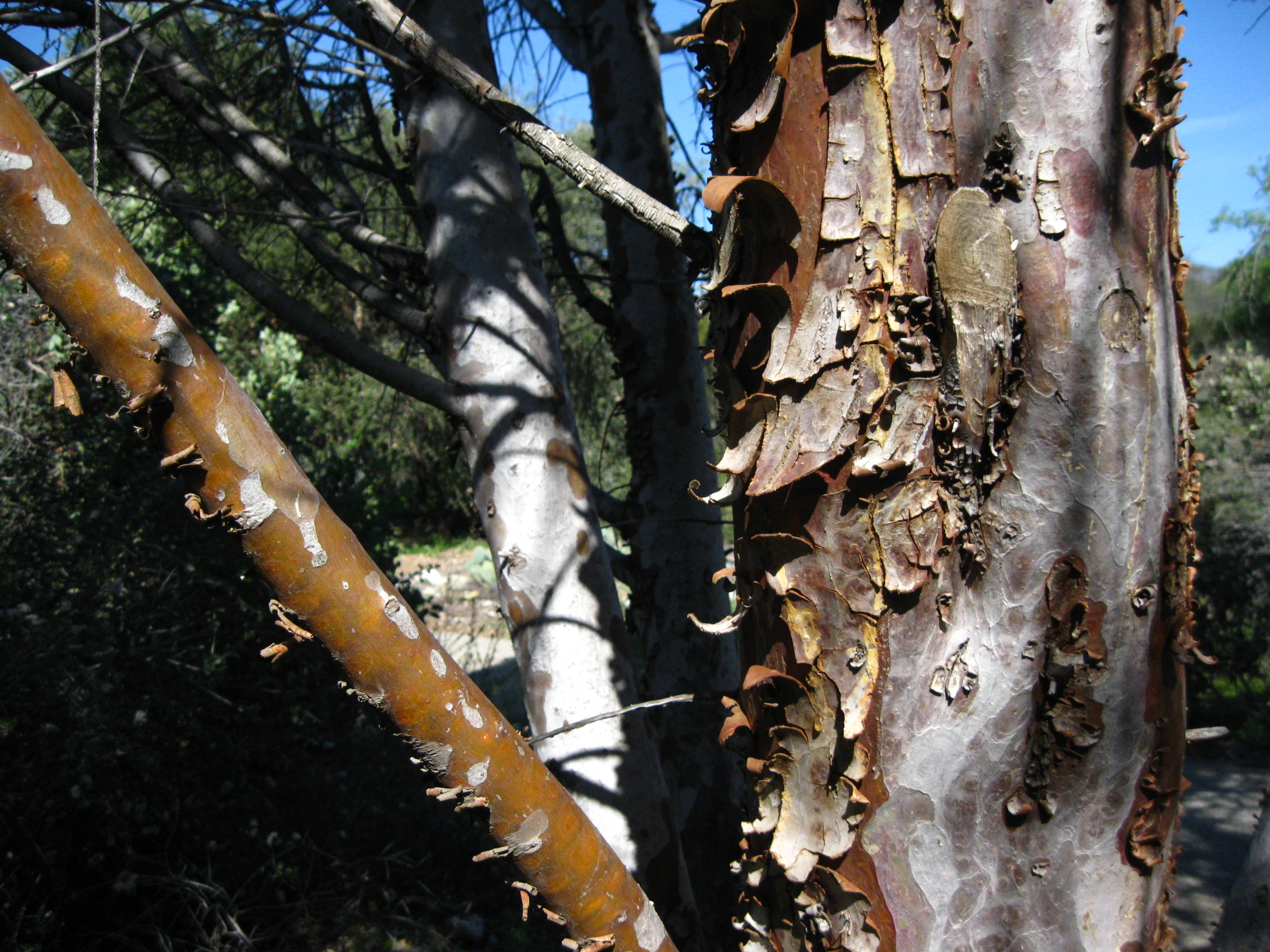
Hesperocyparis stephensonii trunk — note the very subtle differences in bark color and texture from H. glabra and H. forbesii.

Hesperocyparis stephensonii is a tree that can attain heights of 10 to 16 m (33 to 52 ft). It usually forms a spreading tree with a central leader, only slightly taller than it is wide.

The tree's female cones are about 10 mm in diameter, while cone scales are normally 6–8 mm. Often, but not always, they have conspicuous umbos 3–4 mm, which are high and conical. There are normally 100-125 seeds per cone, not at all glaucous. 3-4 cotyledons are usually present. It is the only western cypress species in California to release pollen in the summertime.

== Taxonomy ==
Hesperocyparis stephensonii was not given a scientific description until 1948. In that year Carl Brandt Wolf published a paper and gave it the name Cupressus stephensonii. At that time it was standard for species classified in Hesperocyparis to be classified as part of a larger Cupressus genus that covered both new and old world species. Though somewhat distinct there was disagreement on its correct classification with it being described as a variety of Cupressus arizonica in 1966 and in 1982 as a subspecies of the same.

In the 2000s new genetic research called into question the classification of New World cypress trees. In 2009 a paper was published by Jim A. Bartel that reclassified most of the North American species into the new genus Hesperocyparis. By the year 2017 this classification was being used by the USDA Natural Resources Conservation Service PLANTS database, California Native Plant Society, and University and Jepson Herbaria.

In the past there has been considerable debate about the status of Hesperocyparis stephensonii as a species and some sources continue to use classifications such as Cupressus arizonica var. stephensonii. As of 2024 Hesperocyparis stephensonii is recognized as an accepted species by Plants of the World Online, World Flora Online, and the Gymnosperm Database.

=== Names ===
Wolf named the species stephensonii to honor Bert Stephenson, a ranger with the US Forest Service who died in 1944. Ranger Stephenson had noticed the trees on King Creek while fighting a forest fire in the area and informed Wolf about them. The common name "Cuyamaca cypress" comes from its native habitat on Cuyamaca Peak.

== See also ==
- Hesperocyparis forbesii — nearby endemic Cypress/Hesperocyparis sp.
- Flora of the California chaparral and woodlands
- Natural history of the Peninsular Ranges
