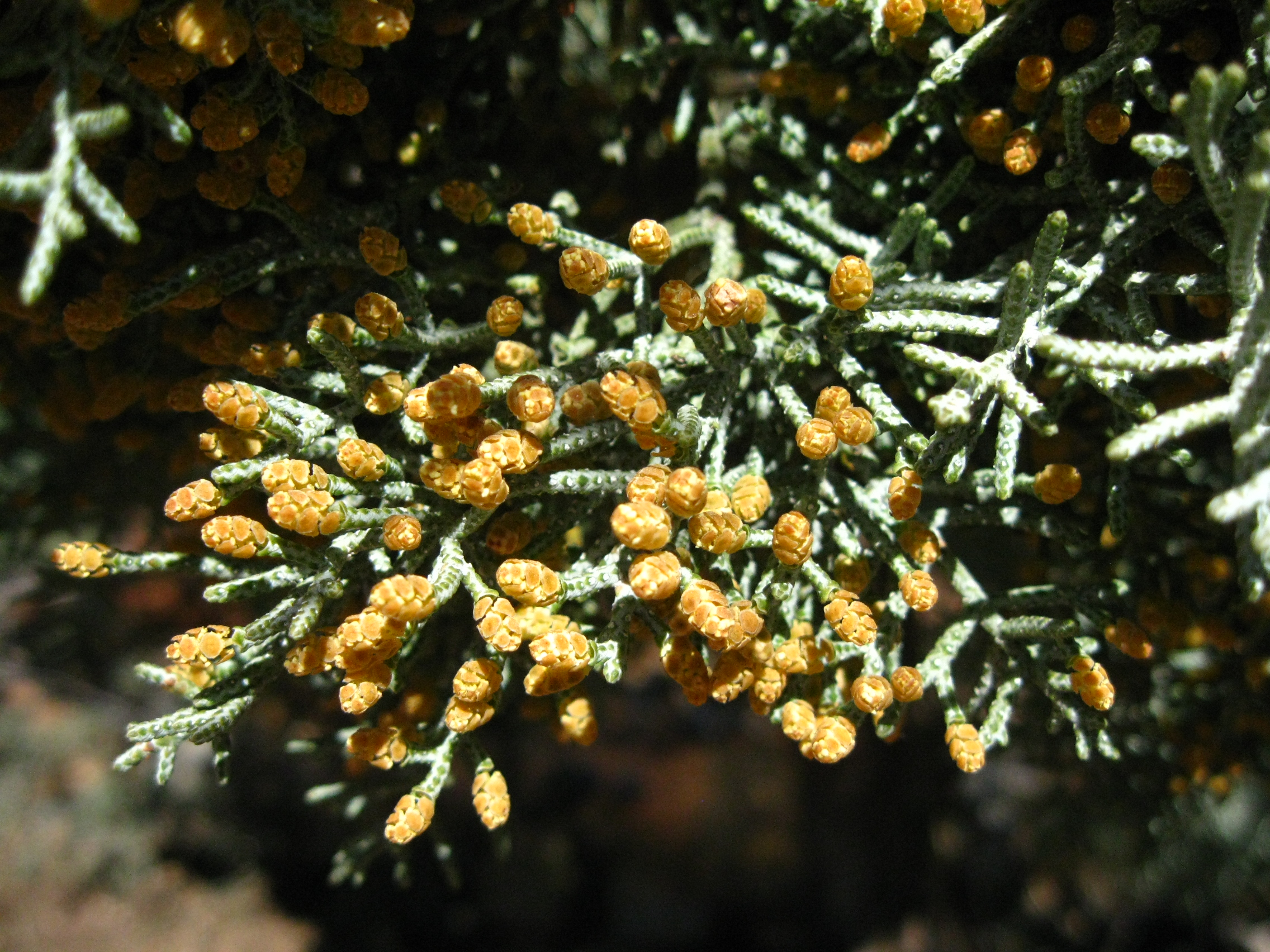
- Male pollen cones
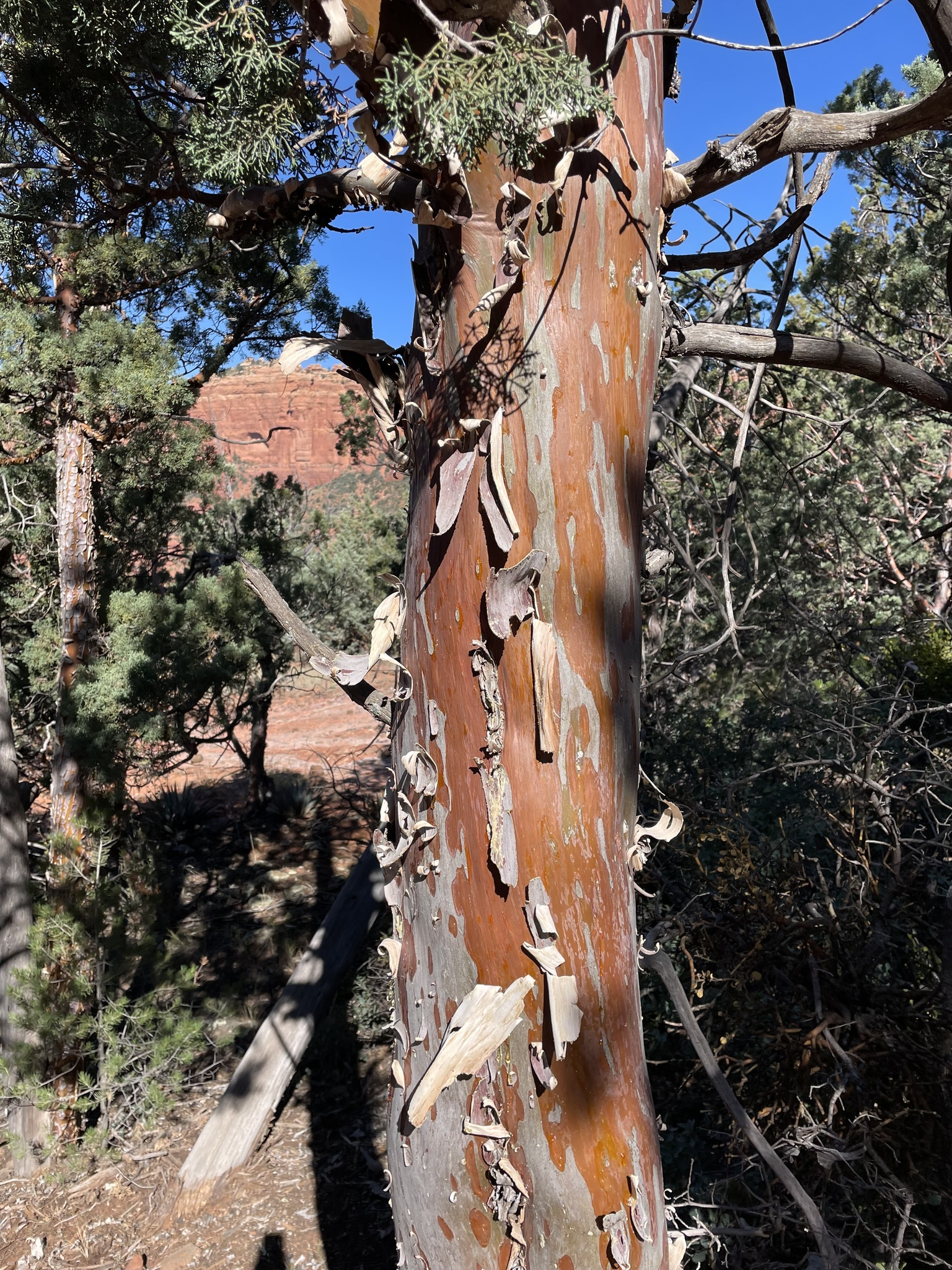
- Hesperocyparis glabra red bark peeling on trunk, Coconino National Forest, Arizona

Conservation status
- Near Threatened (IUCN 3.1)

Scientific classification
- Kingdom: Plantae
- Clade: Tracheophytes
- Clade: Gymnosperms
- Division: Pinophyta
- Class: Pinopsida
- Order: Cupressales
- Family: Cupressaceae
- Genus: Hesperocyparis
- Species: H. glabra

Binomial name
- Hesperocyparis glabra (Sudw.) Bartel

Synonyms
- Callitropsis glabra (Sudw.) D.P.Little (2006); Cupressus arizonica subsp. glabra (Sudw.) A.E.Murray (1982); Cupressus arizonica var. glabra (Sudw.) Little (1966); Cupressus glabra Sudw. (1910); Neocupressus arizonica var. glabra (Sudw.) de Laub. (2009)

= Hesperocyparis glabra =

Species of conifer

Hesperocyparis glabra, the Arizona smooth bark cypress or smooth Arizona cypress, is a conifer in the cypress family, Cupressaceae, native to the American Southwest, with a range stretching over the canyons and slopes in a somewhat wide vicinity around Sedona, Arizona. It is distinguished from Hesperocyparis arizonica by its very smooth, non-furrowed bark which can appear in shades of pink, cherry, and grey.

It is often seen in cultivation, as unlike the Monterey cypress, it has proved to be very resistant to cypress canker.

== Taxonomy ==
Hesperocyparis glabra was scientifically described by George Bishop Sudworth in 1910 with the name of Cupressus glabra. In 1966 the botanist Elbert Luther Little published a paper where he argued that it was a subspecies of what was then Cupressus arizonica. Along with the other new world Cupressus species it was transferred to the new genus Hesperocyparis in 2009. At the same time the authors restored it as a species under its present name.

As of 2024 Hesperocyparis glabra is listed as the accepted species name with no subspecies by Plants of the World Online (POWO), World Flora Online, and the USDA Natural Resources Conservation Service PLANTS database (PLANTS).
