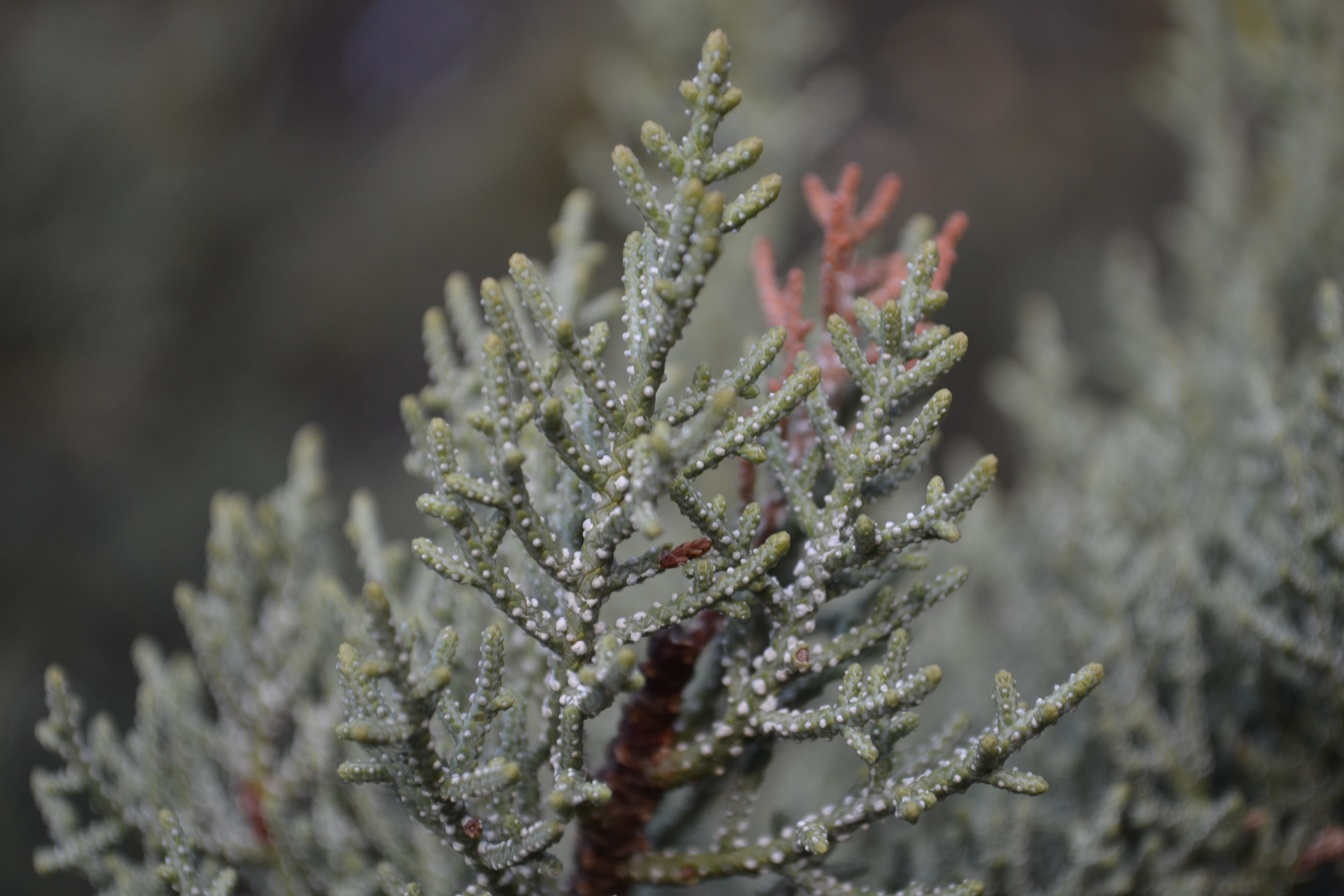
- Foliage is highly glandular, resinous, and aromatic.

Conservation status
- Endangered (IUCN 3.1)

Scientific classification
- Kingdom: Plantae
- Clade: Tracheophytes
- Clade: Gymnosperms
- Division: Pinophyta
- Class: Pinopsida
- Order: Cupressales
- Family: Cupressaceae
- Genus: Hesperocyparis
- Species: H. nevadensis

Binomial name
- Hesperocyparis nevadensis (Abrams) Bartel
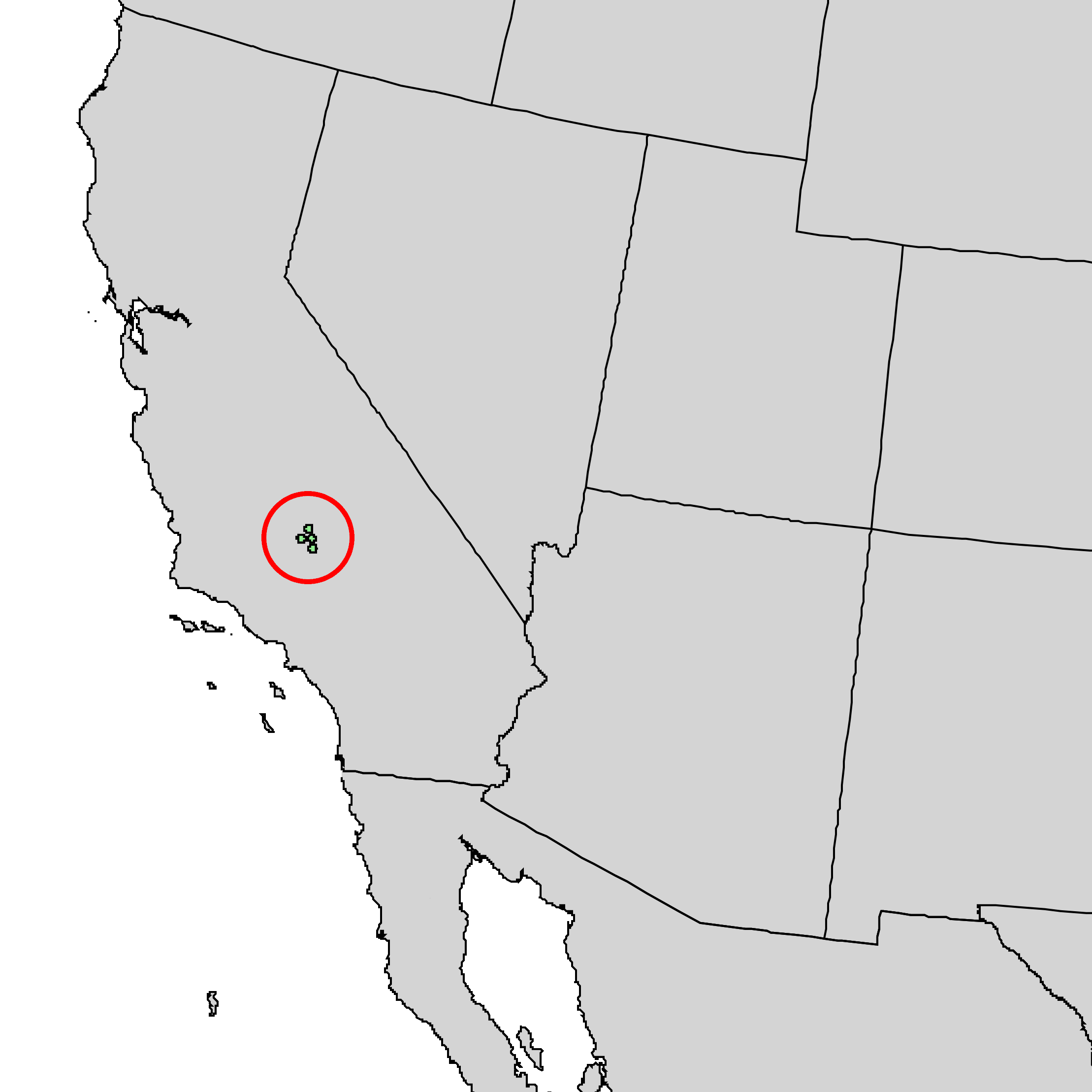
- Natural range of Hesperocyparis nevadensis
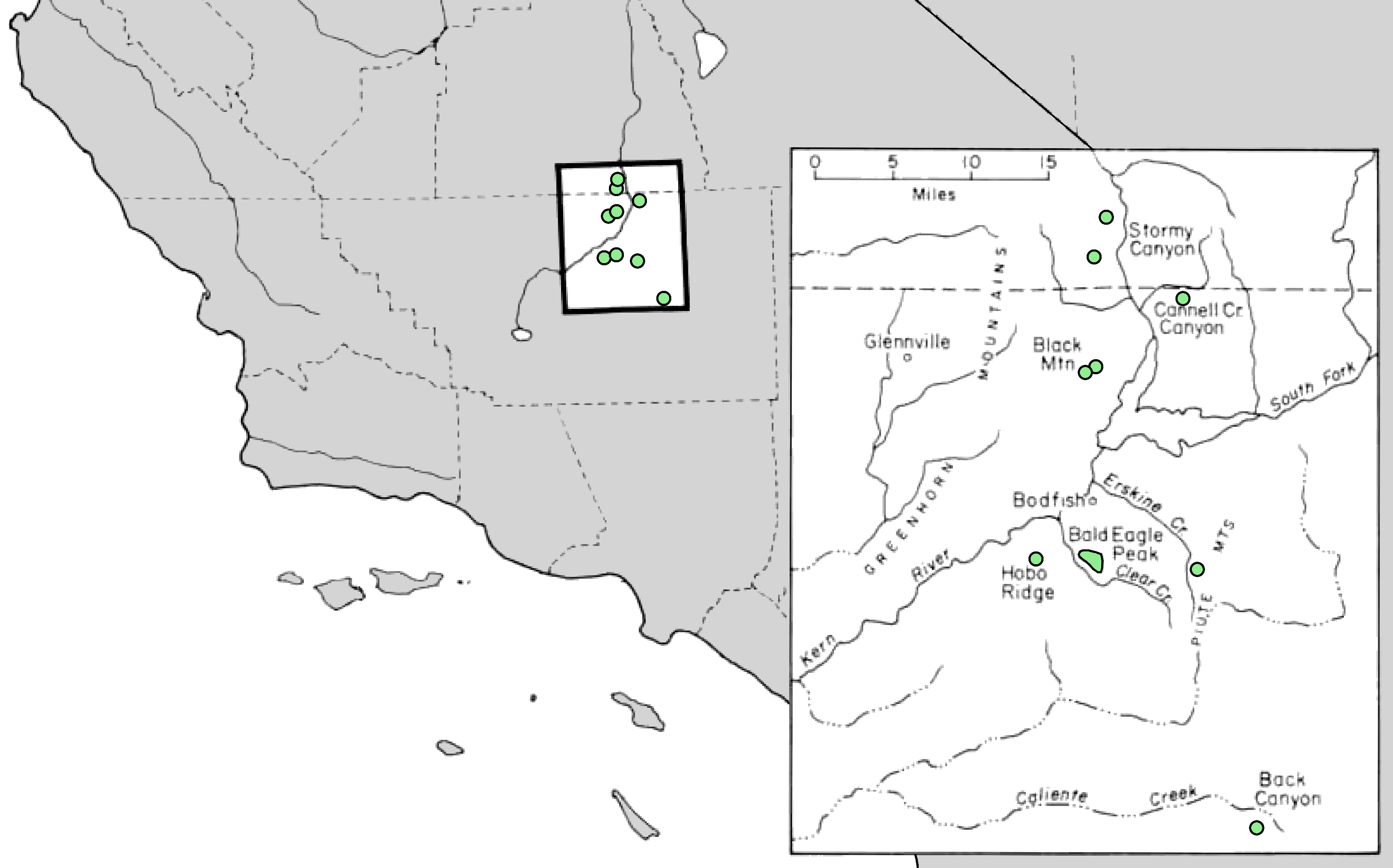
- Close-up of natural range of Hesperocyparis nevadensis

Synonyms
- List: Callitropsis nevadensis (Abrams) D.P.Little (2006); Cupressus arizonica var. nevadensis (Abrams) Little (1966); Cupressus arizonica subsp. nevadensis (Abrams) A.E.Murray (1982); Cupressus macnabiana var. nevadensis (Abrams) Abrams (1923); Cupressus nevadensis Abrams (1919); Hesperocyparis arizonica var. nevadensis (Abrams) de Laub. (2012); Neocupressus arizonica var. nevadensis (Abrams) de Laub. (2009)

= Hesperocyparis nevadensis =

Californian species of western cypress

Hesperocyparis nevadensis, the Paiute cypress, is a species of conifer in the cypress family, Cupressaceae. It is endemic to a small area in the Sierra Nevada Mountains of California in the western United States.

== Distribution ==
The Paiute cypress grows in a small area of the Southern Sierra Nevada, within Kern County, California and Tulare County. It is found on soils of granitic origin at altitudes of 3,000–6,000 feet (910–1,830 m). It is found in pinyon/juniper and oak/pine woodlands, chaparral, and closed-cone-cypress forest habitats.

The largest grove composed primarily of the species is located south of the town of Bodfish in the Lake Isabella region. There are eight or so other populations of much smaller, scattered stands in the Southern Sierras.

== Description ==
Hesperocyparis nevadensis is a medium-sized coniferous tree with a conic crown, growing to heights of 10–25 m (exceptionally to 39 m), and a trunk diameter of up to 0.5 m (exceptionally to 1 m). The foliage grows in sparse, very fragrant, sprays varying from dull gray-green to glaucous blue-green in color. The leaves are scale-like, highly glandular, resinous and aromatic, 2–5 mm long, and produced on rounded (not flattened) shoots.

The seed cones are globose to oblong, 25–55 mm long, with 6 or 8 (rarely 4 or 10) scales, green to brown at first, maturing gray or gray-brown about 20–24 months after pollination. The male cones are 3–5 mm long, and release pollen in February–March.

The cones often remain closed for several years, only opening after the parent tree is killed in a wildfire, thereby allowing the seeds to colonize the bare ground exposed by the natural fire.

=== Conservation ===
Like most California cypress, it is a pyrophyte, heavily reliant on wildfire for its regeneration. Fire suppression policies of the past decades have severely limited reproduction of this fire dependent species. It is on the IUCN Red List as an endangered species.

== Taxonomy ==
It has been reclassified in the genus Hesperocyparis, with other former Cupressus species native to western North America. It was also previously included as a subspecies within Cupressus arizonica, Cupressus arizonica subsp. nevadensis. USDA: Hesperocyparis nevadensis synonyms; Cupressus arizonica subsp. nevadensis . accessed 8.28.2015

== See also ==
- Fire ecology
- Flora of the Sierra Nevada (United States)
