= Karl Theodor Hartweg =

German botanist

- Born: 18 June 1812
- Died: 3 February 1871 (aged 58)
- Known for: Collection of plants from Colombia, Ecuador, Guatemala, Mexico and California
- Scientific career
- Fields: Botanist
- Author abbrev. (botany): Hartw.

Karl Theodor Hartweg (18 June 1812 – 3 February 1871) was a German botanist. He collected numerous new species of plants in Colombia, Ecuador, Guatemala, Mexico and California in the United States, collecting for the London Horticultural Society. Many of the species he discovered were formally published, with attribution, by George Gordon, the Foreman of the London Horticultural Society Gardens and a specialist in the conifers which were well represented in Hartweg's collections.

Many plants collected in Mexico by Hartweg from 1836 onward were identified and catalogued by George Bentham in Plantas Hartwegianas.
