= George Gordon (botanist) =

British botanist

- Born: 1806
- Died: 1879 (age about 73)
- Known for: Work on conifers, The Pinetum
- Scientific career
- Fields: Botany
- Institutions: London Horticultural Society
- Author abbrev. (botany): Gordon

George Gordon (1806–1879) was a British botanist. He worked for the London Horticultural Society as Foreman of the Horticultural Society Gardens at Chiswick, near London.

Gordon is particularly noted for his work on conifers, publishing The Pinetum in 1858, followed by a Supplement in 1862 and a fully revised second edition of The Pinetum in 1875. He described many new species of conifers from specimens collected by Karl Theodor Hartweg in Mexico and California.
