= World Flora Online =

Encyclopedic list of scientific plant names

- Website type: Encyclopedia
- Available in: English
- Creators: Royal Botanic Gardens, Kew and Missouri Botanical Garden
- Website: about.worldfloraonline.org
- Launched: October 2012
- Current status: Active

World Flora Online (WFO) is an Internet-based compendium of the world's plant species.

== Description ==
The World Flora Online (WFO) is an open-access database, launched in October 2012 as a follow-up project to The Plant List, with the aim of publishing an online flora of all known plants by 2020. It is a project of the United Nations Convention on Biological Diversity, with the goal of halting the loss of plant species worldwide by 2020. It is developed by a collaborative group of institutions around the world in response to the 2011–2020 Global Strategy for Plant Conservation (GSPC)'s updated Target 1: to produce "an online flora of all known plants".

An accessible flora of all known plant species was considered a fundamental requirement for plant conservation. It provides a baseline for the achievement and monitoring of other targets of the strategy. The previous target of GSPC was achieved in 2010 with The Plant List. WFO was conceived in 2012 by an initial group of four institutions; the Missouri Botanical Garden, the New York Botanical Garden, the Royal Botanic Garden Edinburgh and the Royal Botanic Gardens, Kew. In all, 36 institutions are involved in the production.

World Flora Online developed WFO's Plant List (wfoplantlist.org) to replace the traditional Plant List v.1.1 (plantlist.org). In 2024, Pl@ntNet joined the WFO consortium.

== See also ==
- International Plant Names Index
- Plants of the World Online
- Tropicos

== Bibliography ==
- Miller, Chuck; Ulate, William (August 23, 2017). "World Flora Online Project: An online flora of all known plants". Proceedings of TDWG. 1 e20529. doi:10.3897/tdwgproceedings.1.20529.
- "World Flora Online: An international initiative of the Global Partnership for Plant Conservation". The World Flora Online Consortium.
- "World Flora Online". Plant Science. Missouri Botanical Garden.
- "The Plant List". Royal Botanic Gardens, Kew; Missouri Botanical Garden. 2013., see also The Plant List
