= Cypress =

Common name of plants in the conifer family Cupressaceae

Cypress is a common name for species in several genera in the family Cupressaceae, particularly the genus of Cupressus. They grow in temperate climates and subtropical regions of Asia, Europe, and North America.

The word cypress is derived from Old French cipres, which was imported from Latin cypressus, the latinisation of the Greek κυπάρισσος (kyparissos). The name derives from Cyparissus, a mythological figure who was turned into a cypress tree after killing a stag.

== Description ==
Cypresses are trees or shrubs reaching heights of 1–50 metres (3.3–164.0 ft), exceptionally (in Cupressus austrotibetica) 100 m (330 ft). Many exhibit a conical to columnar form, particularly in their youth, but some are prostrate, irregular, or shrubby. They are characterised by their scale-like, evergreen foliage and globose seed cones. Some species develop flattened, spreading crowns at maturity. The bark of cypress trees varies, with some species having smooth surfaces, while most exhibit bark that separates into thin plates or strips, often shedding over time. The leaves of young cypress seedlings are spreading and awl-shaped, becoming small, scale-like leaves that tightly adhere to older branches when the seedlings are more than one to five years old, with glandular pits on the outer surface, and cover the stem in opposite pairs, giving the branchlet a four-sided appearance. Many are aromatic.

== Species ==
A selection of species that are commonly known as cypresses include the following (this is not a complete list; refer to the genus links for a fuller list for each genus):

- Cupressus:
  - Cupressus atlantica (Moroccan cypress), Atlas Mountains in Morocco
  - Cupressus austrotibetica (South Tibetan cypress), Parlung Tsangpo Gorges, southern Tibet
  - Cupressus duclouxiana (Yunnan cypress), SW China
  - Cupressus dupreziana (Saharan cypress), mountains of southern Algeria
  - Cupressus funebris (Chinese weeping cypress), southern China
  - Cupressus gigantea (Tibetan cypress), Tibet
  - Cupressus sempervirens (Mediterranean cypress, also referred to as Italian cypress). It is native to the eastern Mediterranean region to Iran.
  - Cupressus torulosa (West Himalayan cypress), western Himalaya
- Callitropsis (often included in Cupressus):
  - Callitropsis nootkatensis (Nootka cypress), western North America
- Hesperocyparis (often included in Cupressus):
  - Hesperocyparis arizonica (Rough-barked Arizona cypress), Arizona, southwest New Mexico, northern Mexico
  - Hesperocyparis bakeri (Modoc cypress), California, southwestern Oregon
  - Hesperocyparis glabra (Smooth Arizona cypress), Arizona
  - Hesperocyparis goveniana (Gowen's cypress), California
  - Hesperocyparis lusitanica, (Mexican cypress), Mexico and Central America.
  - Hesperocyparis macnabiana (MacNab's cypress), California
  - Hesperocyparis macrocarpa (Monterey cypress), California
  - Hesperocyparis pygmaea (Mendocino cypress), California
  - Hesperocyparis sargentii (Sargent's cypress), California
- Xanthocyparis (often included in Cupressus):
  - Xanthocyparis vietnamensis (Vietnamese golden cypress), Vietnam, extreme southern China
- Chamaecyparis: eastern Asia and North America.
  - Chamaecyparis formosensis (Formosan cypress), Taiwan
  - Chamaecyparis lawsoniana (Lawson's cypress). This is a native species to Oregon and northwestern California.
  - Chamaecyparis obtusa (hinoki cypress), Japan, Taiwan
  - Chamaecyparis pisifera (sawara cypress), Japan
  - Chamaecyparis thyoides (white cypress), southeastern USA
- Fokienia (often included in Chamaecyparis):
  - Fokienia hodginsii (Fujian cypress), southeastern China, eastern Indochina
- Microbiota
  - Microbiota decussata (Siberian cypress), Sikhote-alin, Russian far east
- Taxodium:
  - Taxodium ascendens (pond cypress), southeastern United States. and native to North America.
  - Taxodium distichum (bald cypress), southeastern United States.
  - Taxodium mucronatum (Montezuma cypress or Montezuma bald cypress), Mexico, Guatemala, and southern-central United States.
- Glyptostrobus
  - Chinese swamp cypress (Glyptostrobus pensilis), Vietnam, critically endangered
- Austrocedrus
  - Austrocedrus chilensis (Cordilleran cypress), native to Chile and Argentina
- Fitzroya
  - Fitzroya cupressoides (Patagonian cypress), southern Chile and Argentina
- Pilgerodendron
  - Pilgerodendron uviferum (Guaitecas cypress), western Patagonia and Tierra del Fuego
- Widdringtonia (African cypresses), four species native to Southern Africa
- Actinostrobus (often included in Callitris) – (cypress-pines), southwestern Australia
- Callitris (cypress-pines), 16 species native to Australia and New Caledonia
Plants named cypress
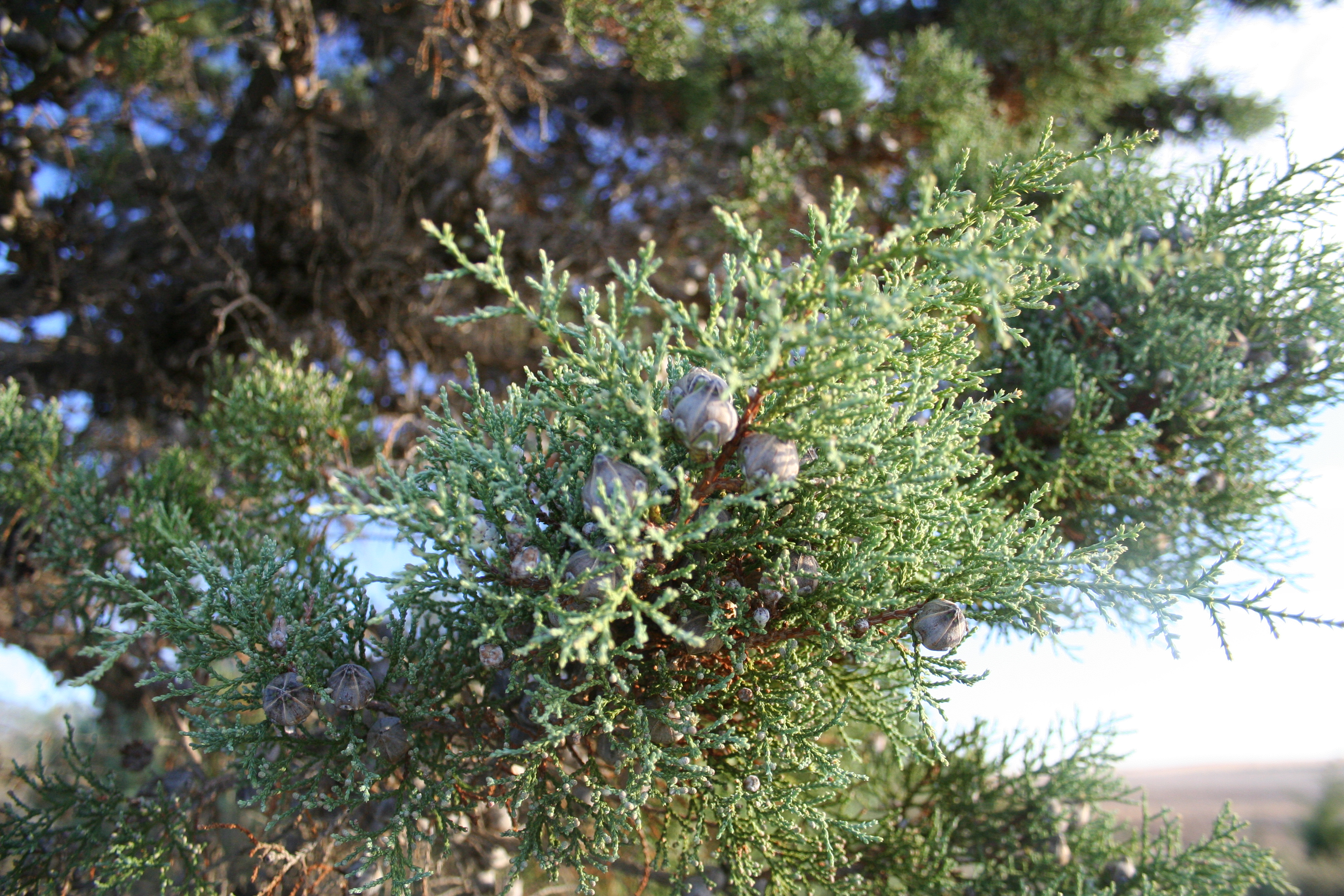
Actinostrobus arenarius

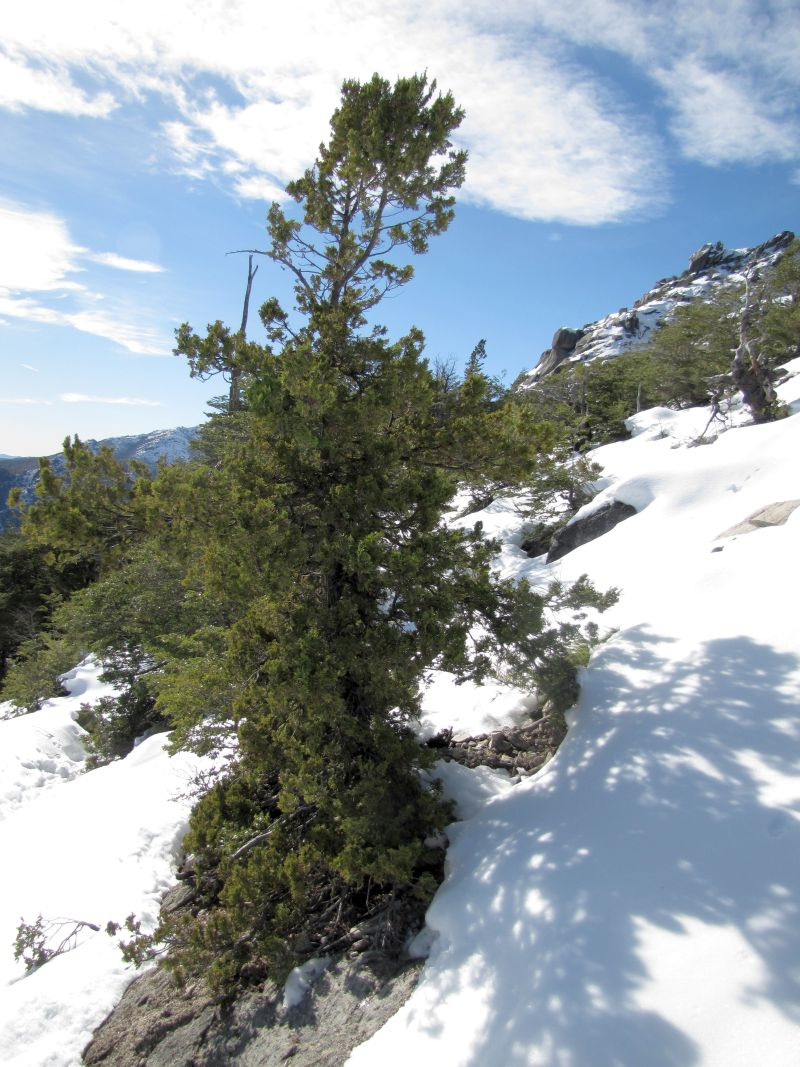
Austrocedrus chilensis

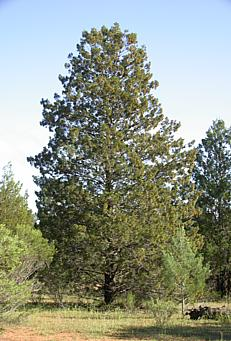
Callitris preissii

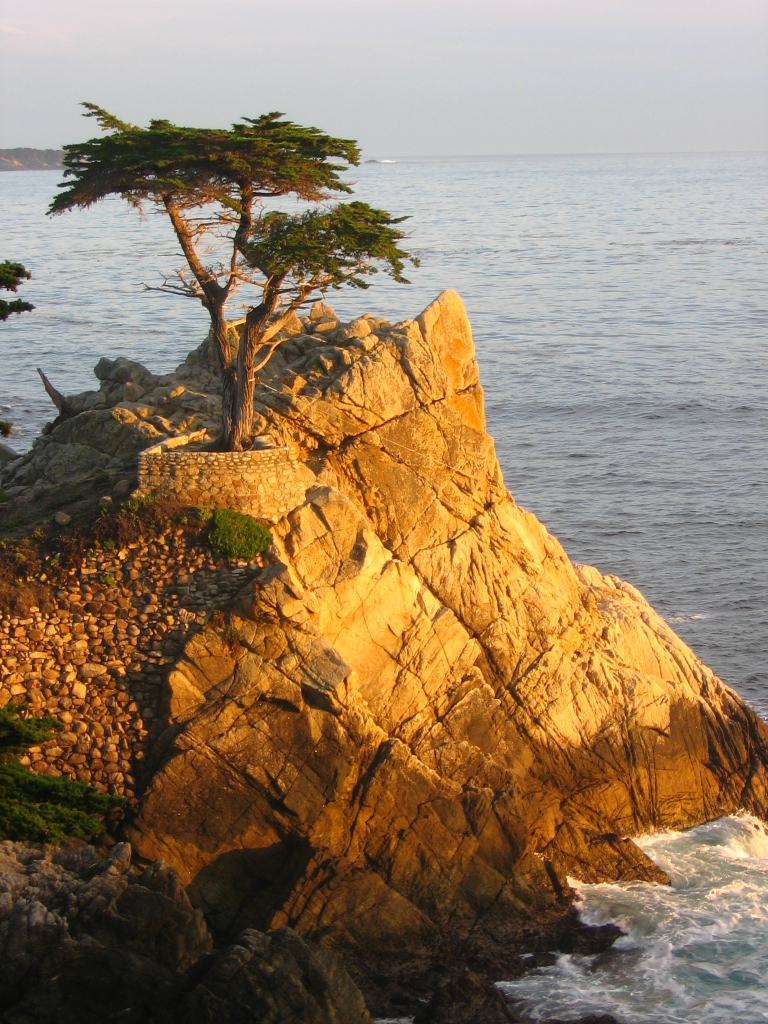
Cupressus macrocarpa, Monterey Peninsula, California

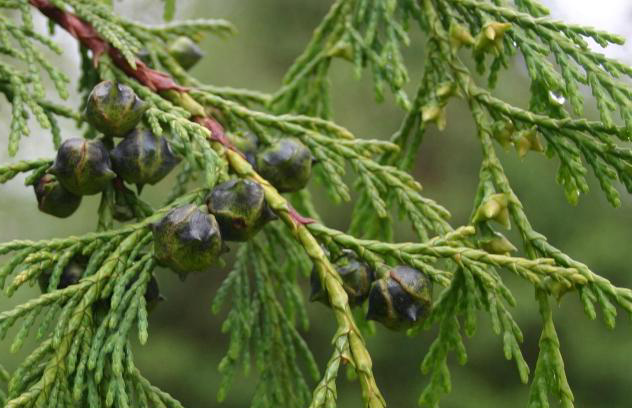
Cupressus nootkatensis

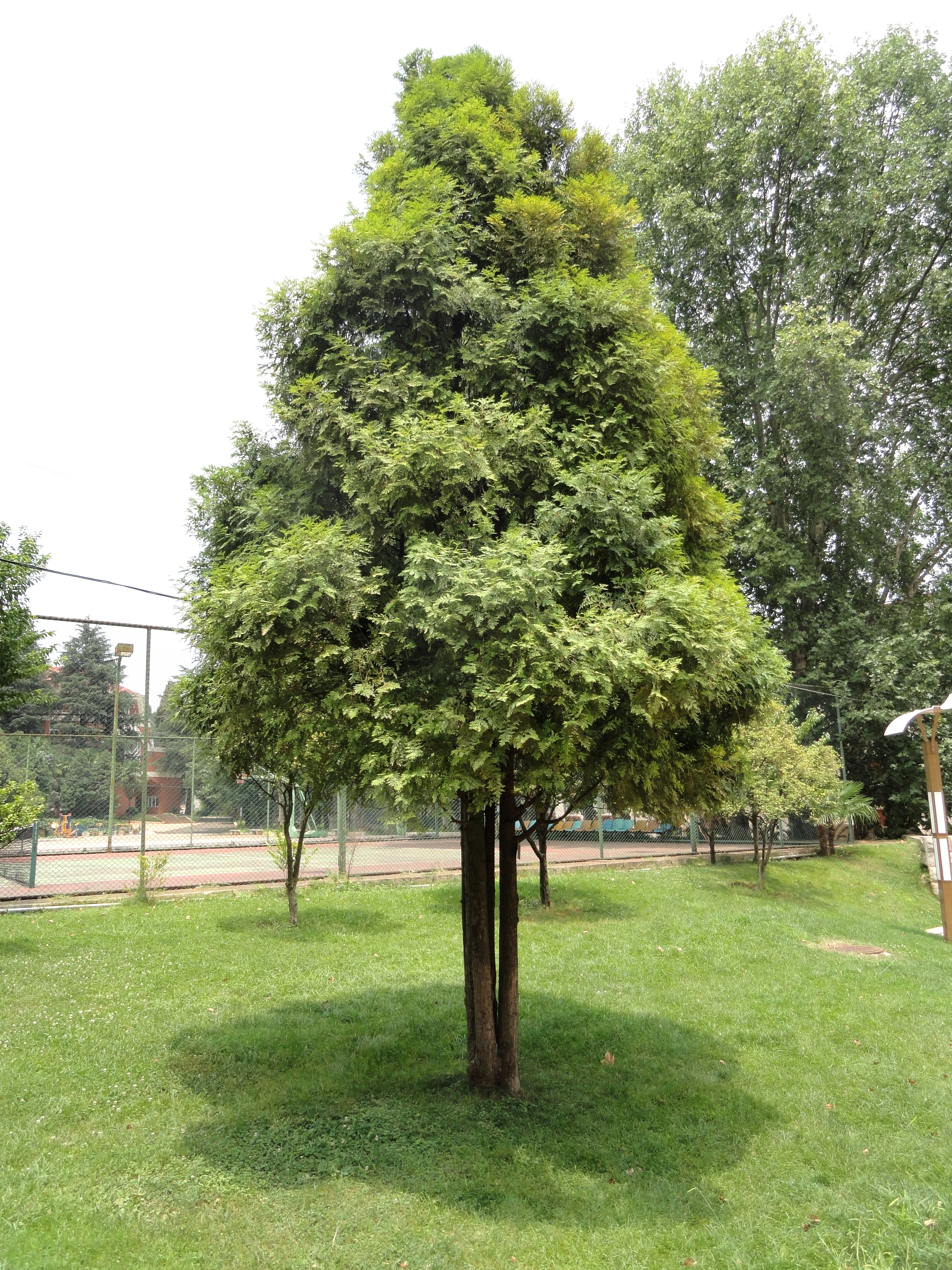
Fokienia hodginsii

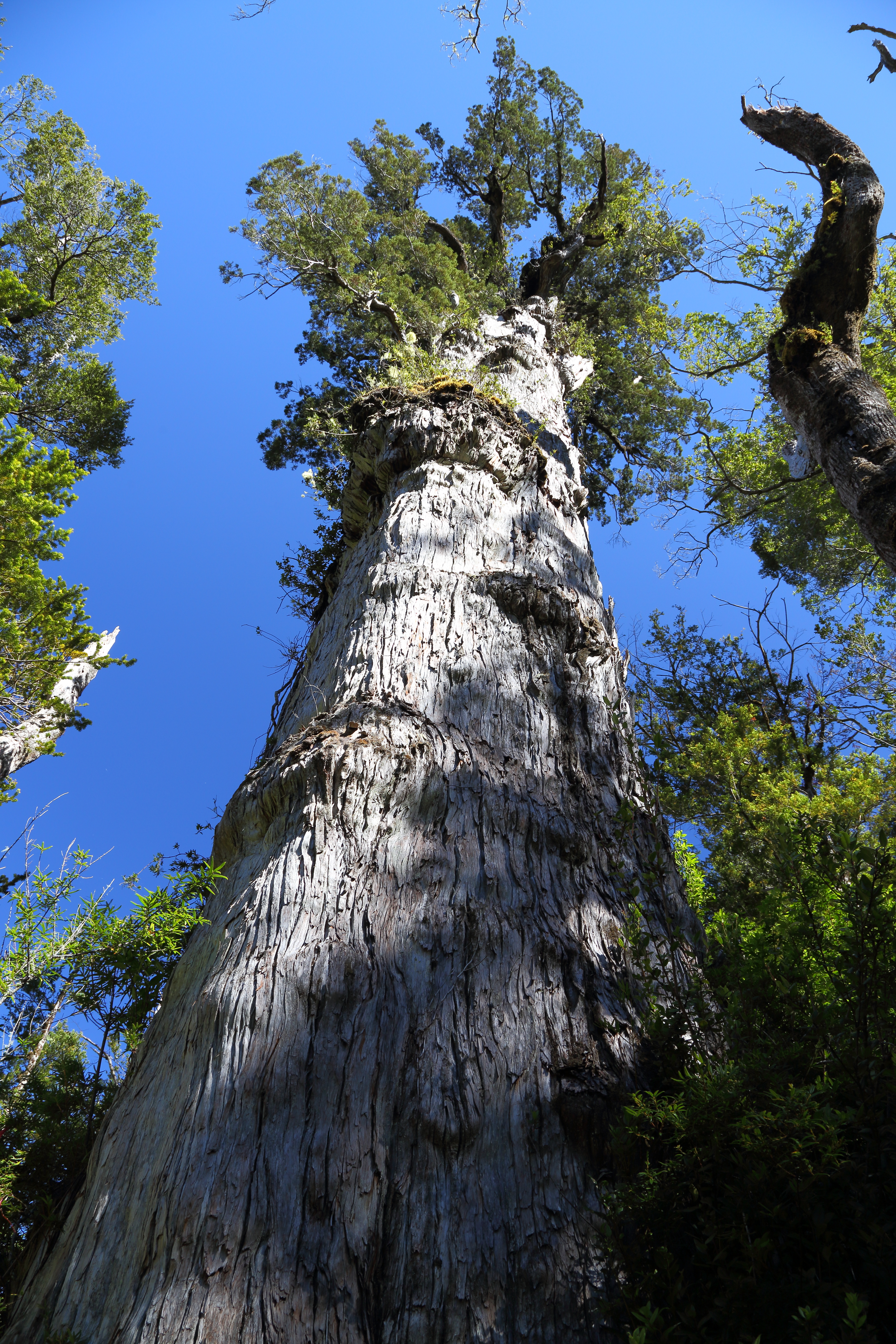
Fitzroya cupressoides

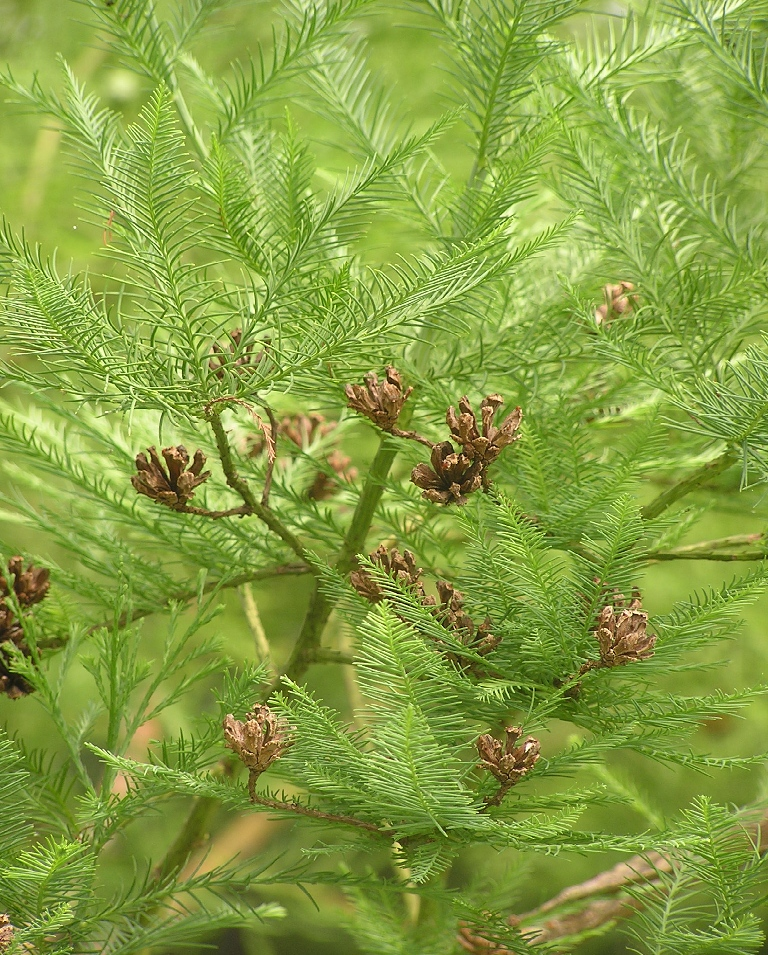
Glyptostrobus pensilis foliage

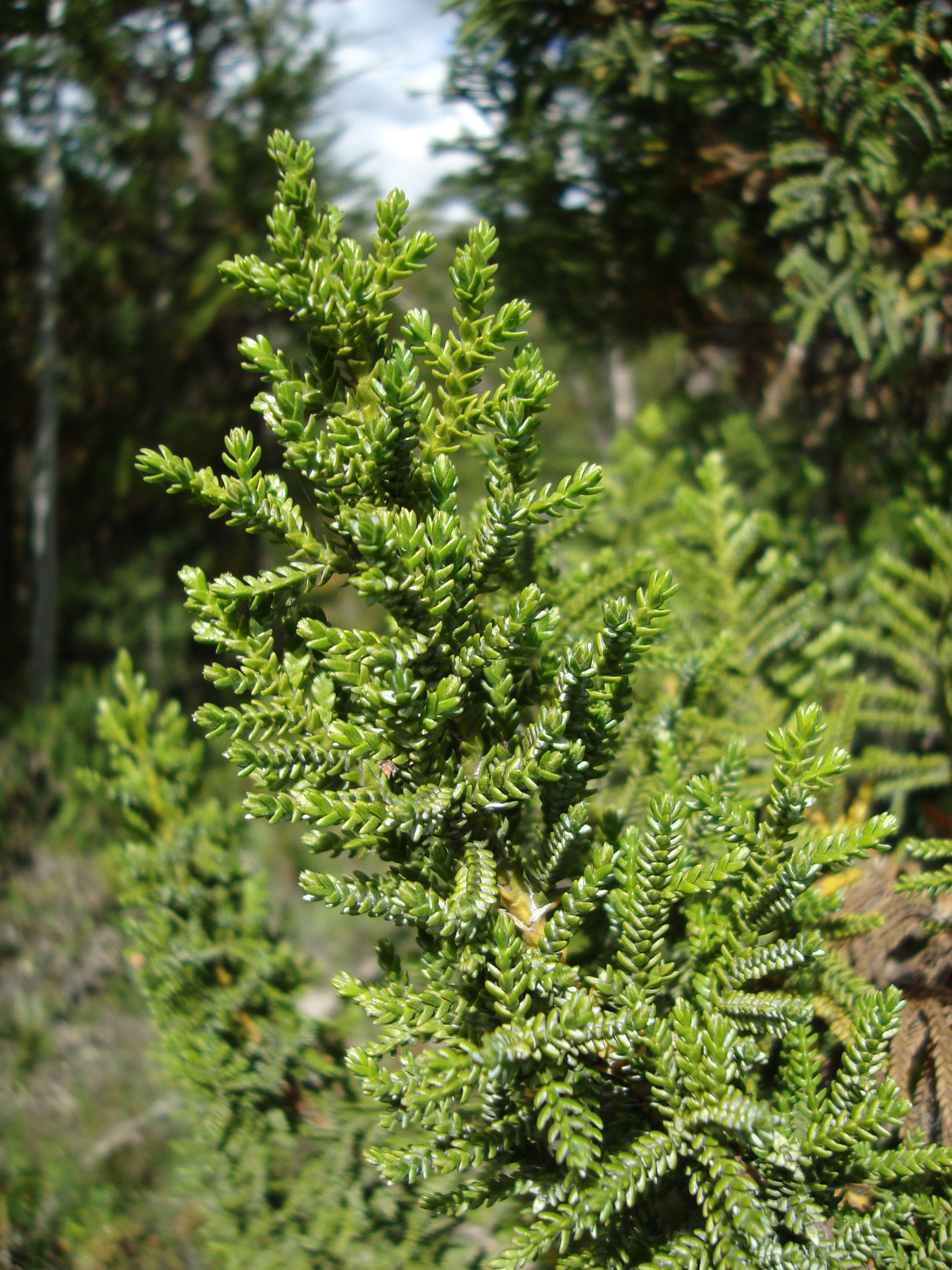
Pilgerodendron uviferum

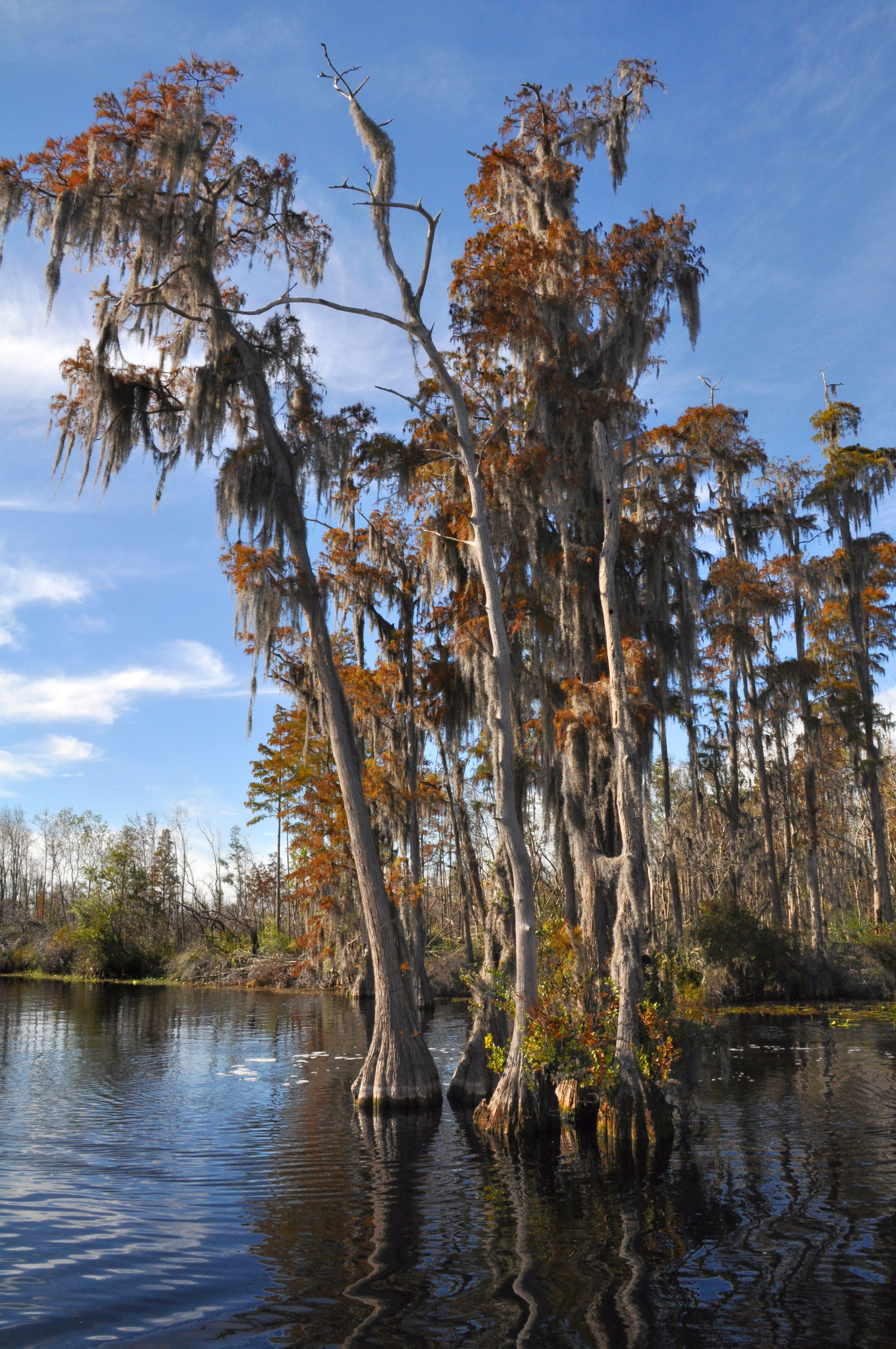
Taxodium ascendens, Okefenokee Swamp, Georgia (USA)

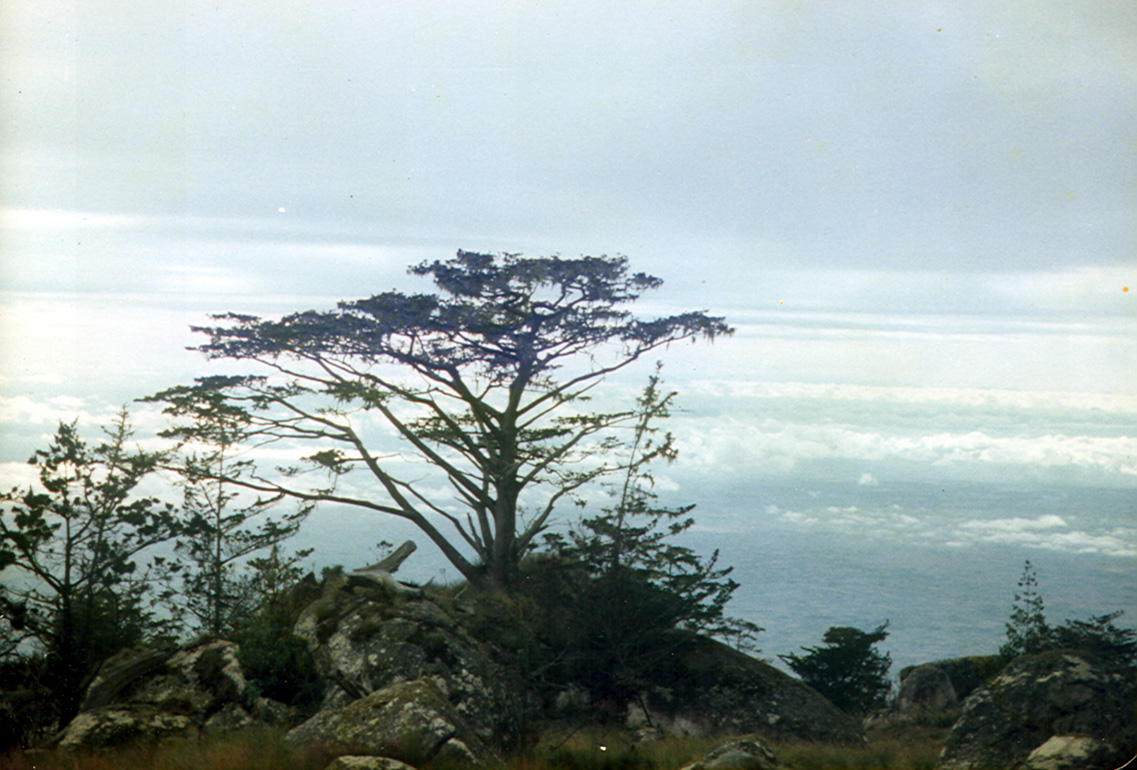
Widdringtonia whytei, Malawi

== Association with mourning ==
In Greek mythology, Cyparissos, Cyparissus or Kyparissos (Ancient Greek: Κυπάρισσος, "cypress") was a male lover of Apollo, as well as other deities in other versions of mythology. In the most prevalent version of the story, Cyparissus receives a stag as a gift from Apollo, which he accidentally kills with a spear while hunting in the forest. Cyparissus is overwhelmed by pain and sorrow, and asks Apollo to allow his tears to flow for eternity. Apollo transforms Cyparissus into a cypress tree, and the sap that typically drips down the tree's trunk represents Cyparissus' tears.

Consequently, the cypress emerged as a symbol of mourning, sadness, and loss in classical mythology, thereby serving an aetiological purpose in explaining its cultural significance. Due to its connection to grief, the cypress became one of the symbols of Hades and has been planted in cemeteries since the classical era. During the Renaissance period, the myth of Kyparissos was revived, and is depicted in several works of art and poetry.

== See also ==
- Cypress forest
- Pine-cypress forest
