= Northeastern Himalayan subalpine conifer forests =

Ecoregion in Northeast Himalayas

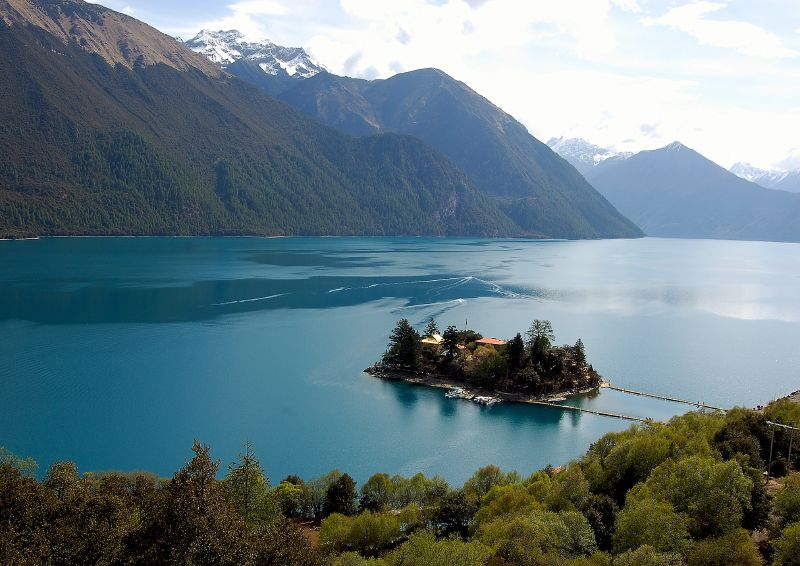
- conifer forests at Pagsum Lake

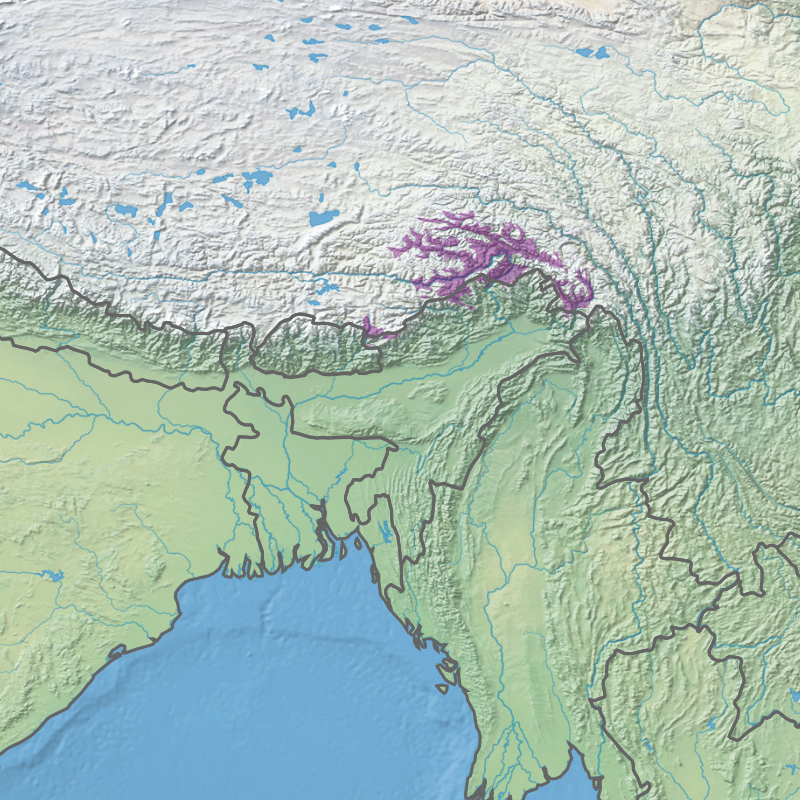
- Location of the ecoregion

Ecology
- Realm: Palearctic
- Biome: temperate coniferous forests
- Borders: Eastern Himalayan alpine shrub and meadows; Eastern Himalayan broadleaf forests; Eastern Himalayan subalpine conifer forests; Southeast Tibet shrub and meadows
- Bird species: 430
- Mammal species: 88

Geography
- Area: 46,300 km^{2} (17,900 mi^{2})
- Countries: Bhutan; China; India

Conservation
- Conservation status: Vulnerable
- Habitat loss: 4.26%
- Protected: 16.7%

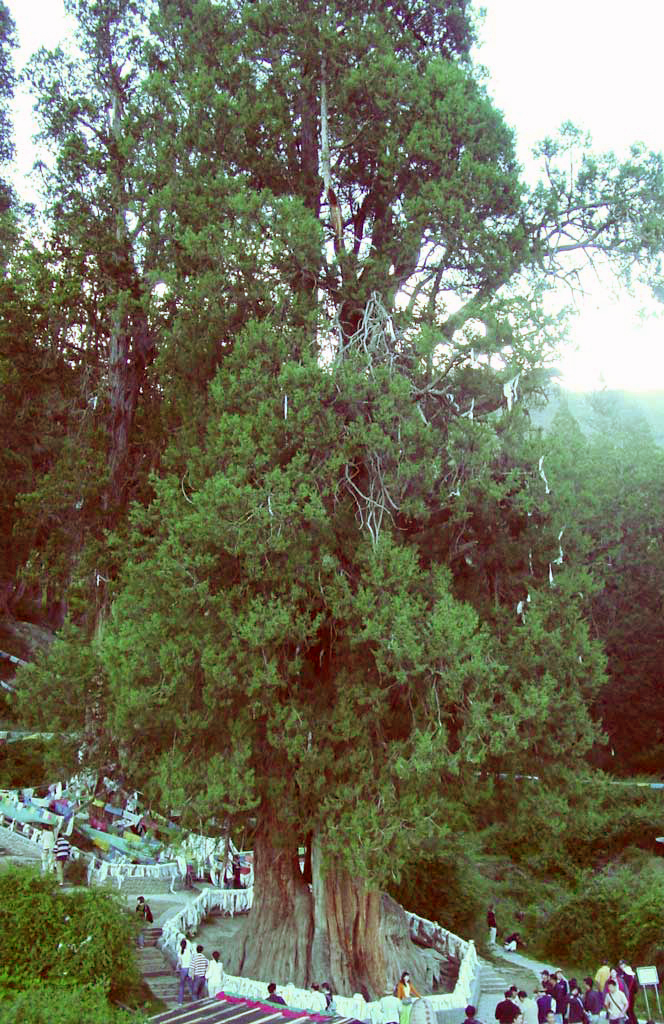
King Cypress, a large Cupressus gigantea in the ecoregion

The Northeastern Himalayan subalpine conifer forests are a temperate coniferous forests ecoregion of the middle to upper elevations of the eastern Himalayas and southeast Tibetan Plateau. The ecoregion occurs in southeastern Tibet Autonomous Region, China, in northern and eastern Arunachal Pradesh, India, and extreme eastern Bhutan.

== Setting ==
Northeastern Himalayan subalpine conifer forests cover 46,300 square kilometres (17,900 mi^{2}) in the southeast Tibetan Plateau, occurring between 2,500 and 4,200 metres (8,200 and 13,800 ft). The forests are mostly in the Yarlung Tsangpo Grand Canyon, where the Yarlung Tsangpo River wraps around the eastern edge of the Himalayas and descends from the Tibetan Plateau. Tributary valleys of the Yarlung Tsangpo, including those of the Nyang River and Parlung Tsangpo, host connected portions of the forests. Isolated pockets occur in the Zayü River valley and Tawang Valley. Many of these forests are found in so-called "inner valleys", which are valleys that are shielded from the South Asian monsoon by mountain ridges but still receive enough precipitation to support thriving forests.

In higher elevations, this ecoregion grades into Eastern Himalayan alpine shrub and meadows and Southeast Tibet shrub and meadows. In lower elevations it grades into Eastern Himalayan broadleaf forests.

== Flora and fauna ==
The dominant trees are Tsuga dumosa, Picea brachytyla, Picea likiangensis, Cupressus austrotibetica, Cupressus gigantea, Cupressus torulosa, and Abies spp. Less common are Larix griffithiana, Larix potaninii, Pinus wallichiana, and Taxus baccata. Near timberline are found various junipers: Juniperus indica, Juniperus recurva, and Juniperus squamata. Betula utilis is often found with the conifers. Conifer trees can grow up to be very tall, sometimes up to 70-80 m. Cupressus torulosa (Himalayan cypress) is one of the tallest known species of trees (up to 102.3 m).

Other broadleaf plants include Acer spp., Magnolia spp., Sorbus spp., Viburnum spp., Lauraceae, and Araliaceae. Rhododendrons reach their pinnacle in this ecoregion. The number of rhododendron species seems to increase above 2,000 metres (6,600 ft), and the Yarlung Tsangpo River gorge alone may harbor over 60 species. The highest forest in the world is found in this ecoregion, with Tibetan juniper reaching heights of 4,900 m (16,100 ft) in Baxoi County, Tibet Autonomous Region.

Important mammals include the red panda, takin, musk deer, red goral, Asiatic black bear, and leopard. Significant birds include the Tibetan eared-pheasant, white-eared pheasant, and the giant babax.

== Conservation ==
This ecoregion tends to be found on steep, inaccessible terrain and thus has avoided significant human settlement.
