= King Cypress =

Cypress tree in Tibet, China

Coordinates: 29°37′22″N 94°24′9″E

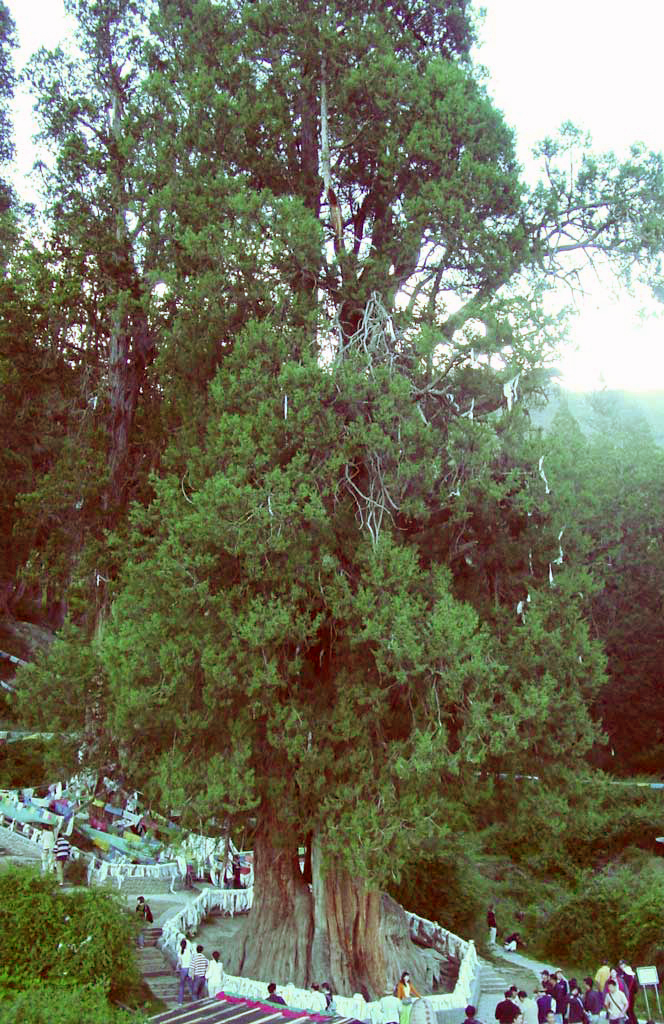
King Cypress tree - the oldest tree in Tibet and perhaps China

King Cypress (Chinese: 柏树王; pinyin: Bóshù wáng; also known as Great Cypress, or as Tibetans call it "the God of Tree") is a giant cypress tree (Cupressus gigantea) in Tibet (about 50 m (160 ft) high, and 5.8 m (19 ft) in diameter, and calculated age of 2,600 years). King Cypress is part of the Northeastern Himalayan subalpine conifer forests and is located near the village of Bajie, about 7 km (4.3 mi) southeast from the town of Bayi, Nyingchi. King Cypress is surrounded by at least 0.1 km² of ancient cypress-trees with an average height of 44 m. King Cypress is said to be the "life tree" of Tönpa Shenrab Miwoche, founder of the Bön tradition of Tibet.

== See also ==
- List of individual trees
- Northeastern Himalayan subalpine conifer forests
