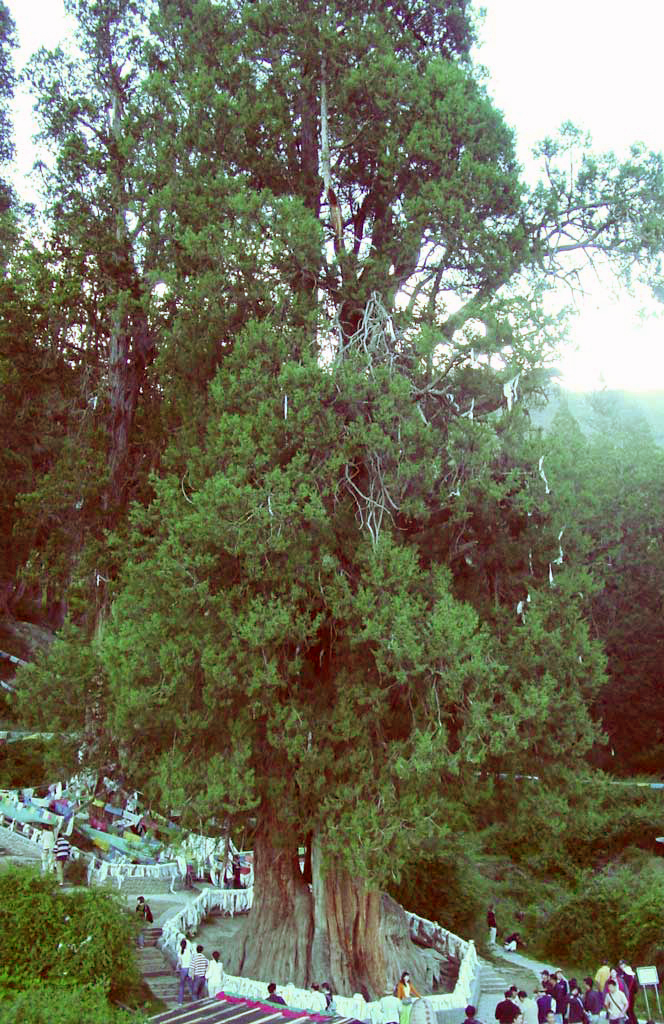

Conservation status
- Vulnerable (IUCN 3.1)

Scientific classification
- Kingdom: Plantae
- Clade: Embryophytes
- Clade: Tracheophytes
- Clade: Spermatophytes
- Clade: Gymnosperms
- Division: Pinophyta
- Class: Pinopsida
- Order: Cupressales
- Family: Cupressaceae
- Genus: Cupressus
- Species: C. gigantea

Binomial name
- Cupressus gigantea W.C.Cheng & L.K.Fu

Synonyms
- Cupressus torulosa var. gigantea (W.C.Cheng & L.K.Fu) Farjon

= Cupressus gigantea =

Species of conifer

Cupressus gigantea, the Tibetan cypress, is a species of conifer in the family Cupressaceae native to southeastern Tibet (Xizang). It has sometimes been classified as a variety of the western Himalayan Cupressus torulosa on the grounds of somewhat similar morphological characteristics, despite its geographical remoteness of over 1,000 km from that species. Recent genetic studies have since confirmed its original status a separate species.

== Distribution ==
It is endemic to the Nyingchi area in southeast Tibet in China on the Qinghai-Tibetan plateau, particularly in the valleys of the Nyang River and Yarlung Tsangpo River in the dry rain shadow of the northern side of the Himalaya. With its very stout trunk, Cupressus gigantea is the largest, though not the tallest, of all Cupressus species; the latter status goes to the 100 m tall Cupressus austrotibetica in the wetter temperate rainforest regions of the Tsangpo drainage further southeast with greater monsoon influence.

== Description ==
Tibetan cypress is a large tree, typically growing to 45 metres (148 ft), sometimes 50 m (160 ft) tall and typically 3 m (9.8 ft) or more trunk diameter, with thick, stringy-furrowed, grey-brown bark. The foliage is glaucous greyish-green, with shoots 1.5-2 mm diameter covered in scale-leaves arranged in opposite decussate pairs. The cones are 15-20 mm long and 13-16 mm diameter, usually with 12 scales.

=== Notable specimens ===
The biggest known specimen is the famous King Cypress, about 50 m (160 ft) high, 5.8 m (19 ft) diameter, and with an estimated age of 2,600 years.
