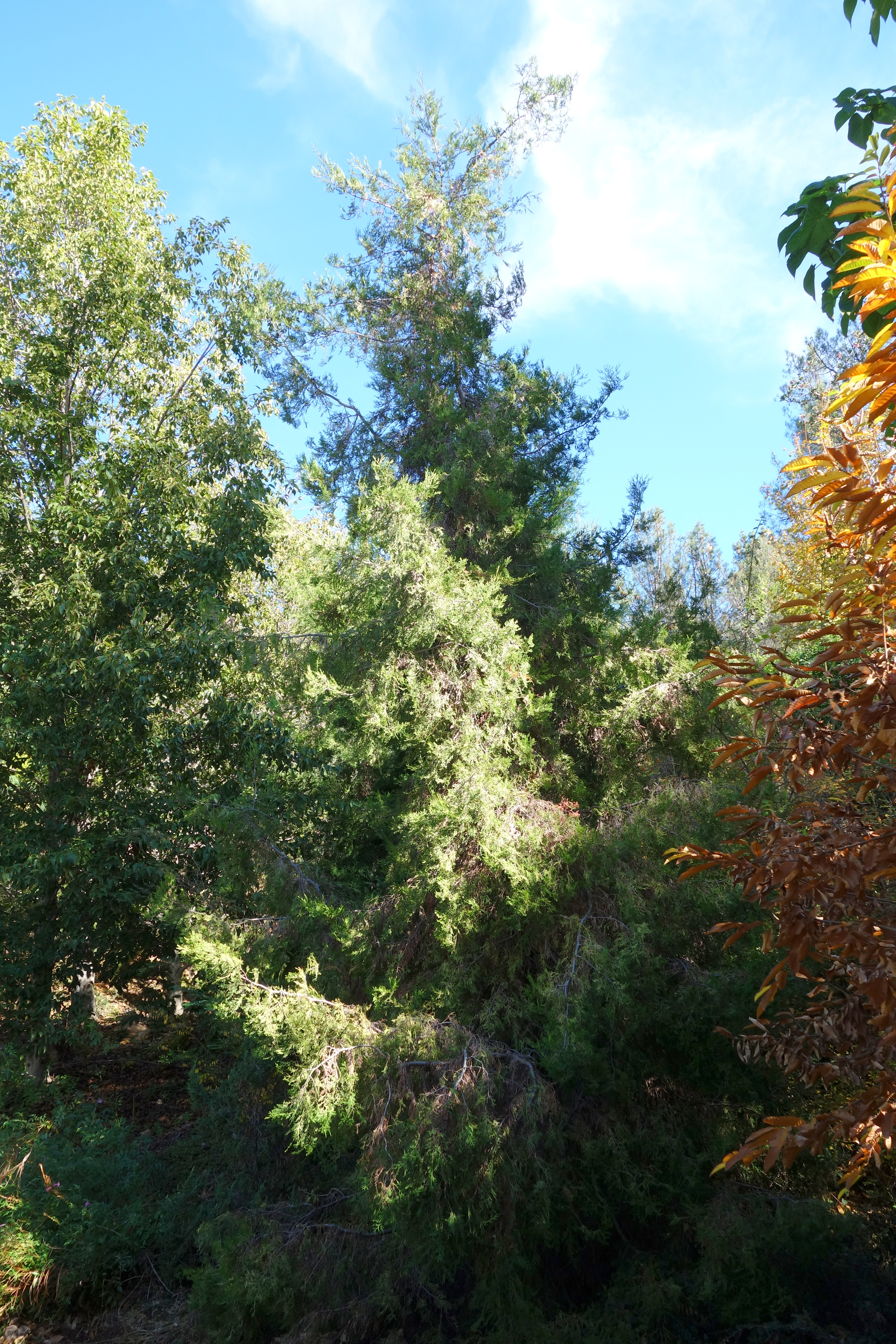

Conservation status
- Vulnerable (IUCN 3.1)

Scientific classification
- Kingdom: Plantae
- Clade: Tracheophytes
- Clade: Gymnospermae
- Division: Pinophyta
- Class: Pinopsida
- Order: Cupressales
- Family: Cupressaceae
- Genus: Cupressus
- Species: C. chengiana

Binomial name
- Cupressus chengiana S.Y.Hu

= Cupressus chengiana =

Species of conifer

Cupressus chengiana is a species of conifer in the family Cupressaceae.

The tree is endemic to China, found only in Gansu and Sichuan Provinces.
