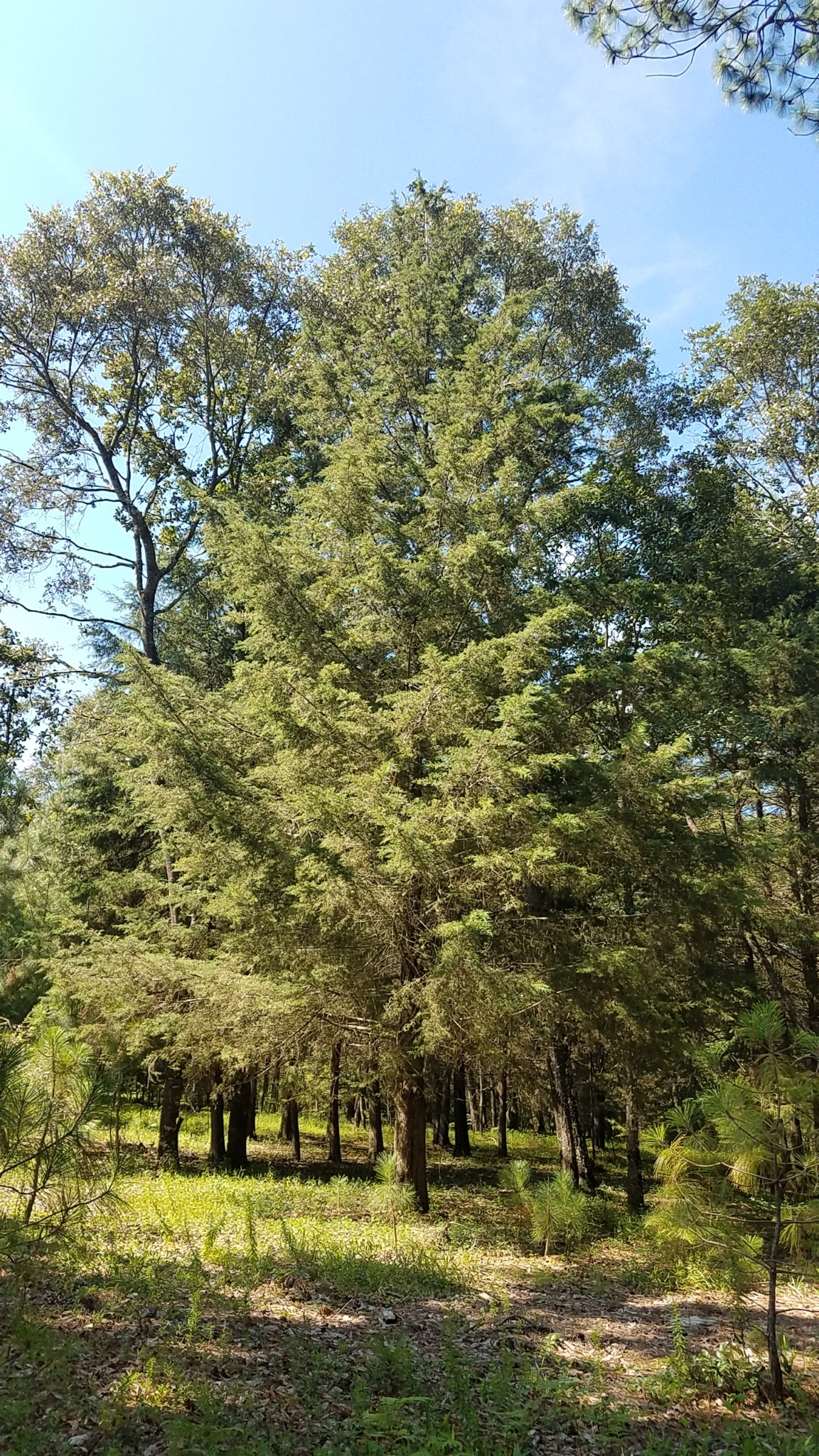
- Hesperocyparis lusitanica in Jalisco, Mexico

Conservation status
- Least Concern (IUCN 3.1)

Scientific classification
- Kingdom: Plantae
- Clade: Tracheophytes
- Clade: Gymnosperms
- Division: Pinophyta
- Class: Pinopsida
- Order: Cupressales
- Family: Cupressaceae
- Genus: Hesperocyparis
- Species: H. lusitanica

Binomial name
- Hesperocyparis lusitanica (Mill.) Bartel

Synonyms
- List: Callitropsis lusitanica (Mill.) D.P.Little (2006); Cupressus assamica Silba (1994); Cupressus benthamii var. lindleyi (Klotzsch ex Endl.) Mast. (1896); Cupressus coerulea J.Verschaff. (1887); Cupressus coerulea var. nana Van Geert (1864); Cupressus coulteri J.Forbes (1839); Cupressus excelsa J.Scott ex Carrière (1855); Cupressus glauca Lam. (1786); Cupressus glauca var. tristis Endl. (1847); Cupressus karwinskiana Regel (1857); Cupressus lindleyi Klotzsch ex Endl. (1847); Cupressus lindleyi var. alba J.Verschaff. (1887); Cupressus lindleyi subsp. hondurensis (Silba) Silba (2005); Cupressus lindleyi var. hondurensis (Silba) Silba (1994); Cupressus lusitanica Mill. (1768); Cupressus lusitanica var. typica Franco (1945); Cupressus mexicana K.Koch (1873); Cupressus pendula L'Hér. (1785); Cupressus sinensis J.Lee ex Gordon & Glend. (1858); Cupressus thurifera Lindl. (1839); Cupressus uhdeana Gordon ex Carrière (1855); Hesperocyparis lindleyi (Klotzsch ex Endl.) Silba (2009); Juniperus uhdeana Gordon (1850); Neocupressus lusitanica (Mill.) de Laub. (2009)

= Hesperocyparis lusitanica =

Central American and Mexican species of western cypress

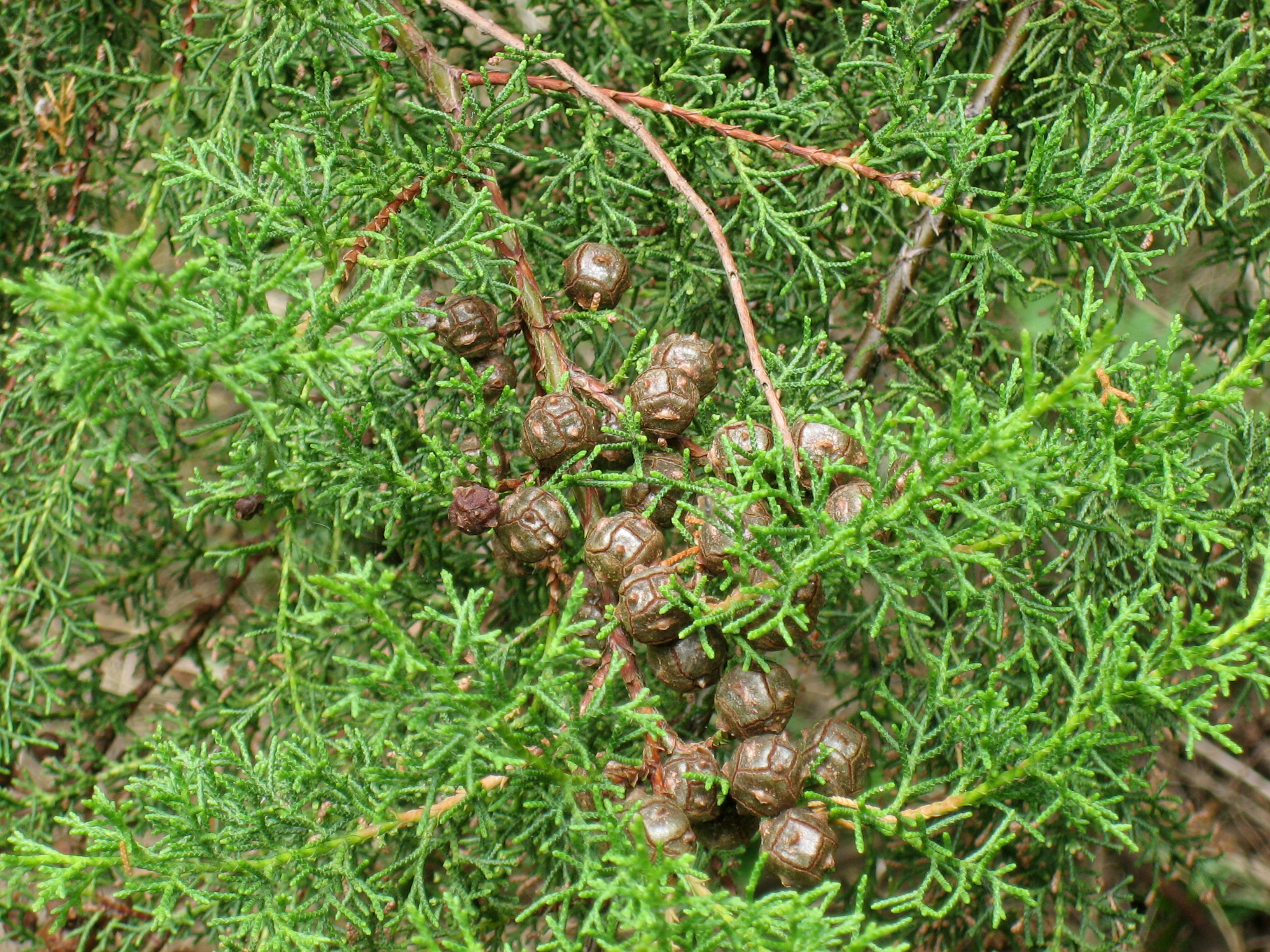
Cupressus lusitanica var. lusitanica foliage and cones

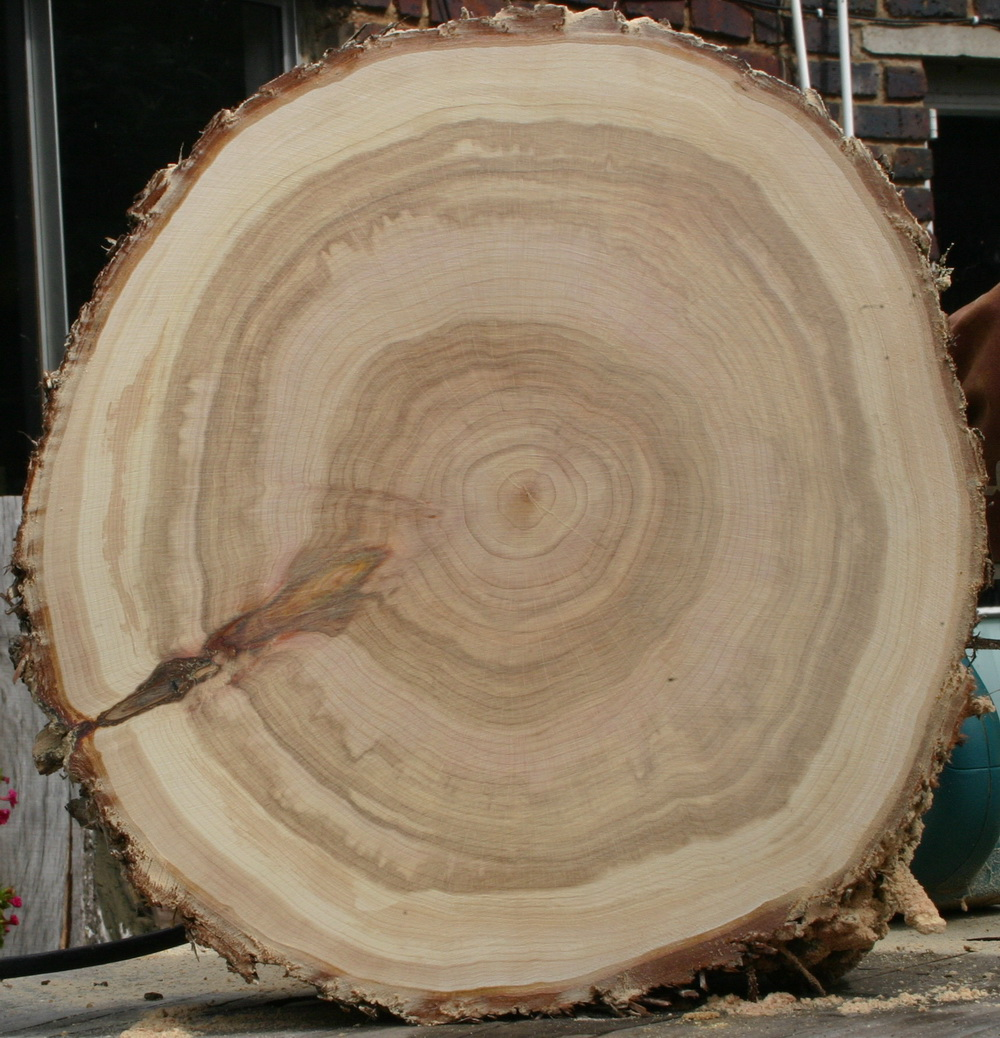
Cupressus lusitanica section

Hesperocyparis lusitanica, the Mexican cypress, cedar-of-Goa or Goa cedar, is a species of conifer in the cypress family, Cupressaceae, native to Mexico and Central America (Guatemala, El Salvador and Honduras). It has also been introduced to Belize, Costa Rica and Nicaragua, growing at 1,200–3,000 metres (3,900–9,800 ft) altitude.

The scientific name lusitanica (of Portugal) refers to its very early cultivation there, with plants imported from Mexico to the monastery at Buçaco, near Coimbra in Portugal in about 1634; these trees were already over 130 years old when the species was botanically described by Miller in 1768.

In Mexico, the tree is also known as cedro blanco (white cedar) or teotlate.

== Description ==
Hesperocyparis lusitanica is a coniferous tree with a conic to ovoid-conic crown, growing to 40 m tall. The foliage grows in dense sprays, dark green to somewhat yellow-green in colour. The leaves are scale-like, 2–5 mm long, and produced on rounded (not flattened) shoots. The seed cones are globose to oblong, 10–20 mm long, with four to 10 scales, green at first, maturing brown or grey-brown about 25 months after pollination.

The cones may either open at maturity to release the seeds, or remain closed for several years, only opening after the parent tree is killed in a wildfire, allowing the seeds to colonise the bare ground exposed by the fire. The male cones are 3–4 mm long, and release pollen in late winter to early spring (February–March in the northern hemisphere). In most of its natural environment the rainfall occurs with more quantity in summer.

== Taxonomy ==
Hesperocyparis lusitanica was given its first scientific name by the botanist Philip Miller who named it Cupressus lusitanica in 1768, because he described it from collections made in Portugal. The species has a large number of synonyms and the species Hesperocyparis benthamii has been treated as variety or subspecies of H. lusitanica. In 2009 a paper was published moving this species and most of the New World Cupressus to the new genus Hesperocyparis. As of 2024 this is listed as the accepted species name with no subspecies or varieties by Plants of the World Online, World Flora Online, and the Gymnosperm Database.

== Cultivation and uses ==
Fast-growing and drought tolerant, but only slightly frost tolerant, Hesperocyparis lusitanica has been introduced from Mexico to different parts of the world like New Zealand. It is widely cultivated, both as an ornamental tree and for timber production, in warm, temperate and subtropical regions around the world. Trees have not been selected for cultivation from northern Mexico populations, which have a heavy drought endurance.

=== Locations ===
Its cultivation and subsequent naturalisation in parts of southern Asia has caused a degree of confusion with native Cupressus species in that region; plants sold by nurseries under the names of Asian species such as Cupressus torulosa often prove to be this species.

It has been planted widely for commercial production: at high altitudes in Colombia (3,300 m, 10,800 ft), Bolivia, Ethiopia and South Africa, and near sea level throughout New Zealand. In Colombia trees are planted to form windbreak hedges and for preventing soil erosion on slopes. It has been planted by Tanzanian mountain farmers for soil preservation and commercial use since the 1990s.

It has been planted as an ornamental tree near sea level in temperate climates and has done very well in Portugal, Buenos Aires Province in Argentina; Austin, Texas and the British Isles where it can reach a height of 30 m (90 feet).

It is being planted in the Argentine province of San Luis, Argentina at 1,500 m (4,900 ft) above sea level to create artificial forests in a land originally lacking them in a very similar climate to that of its native habitat.

== See also ==
- Cedar wood
