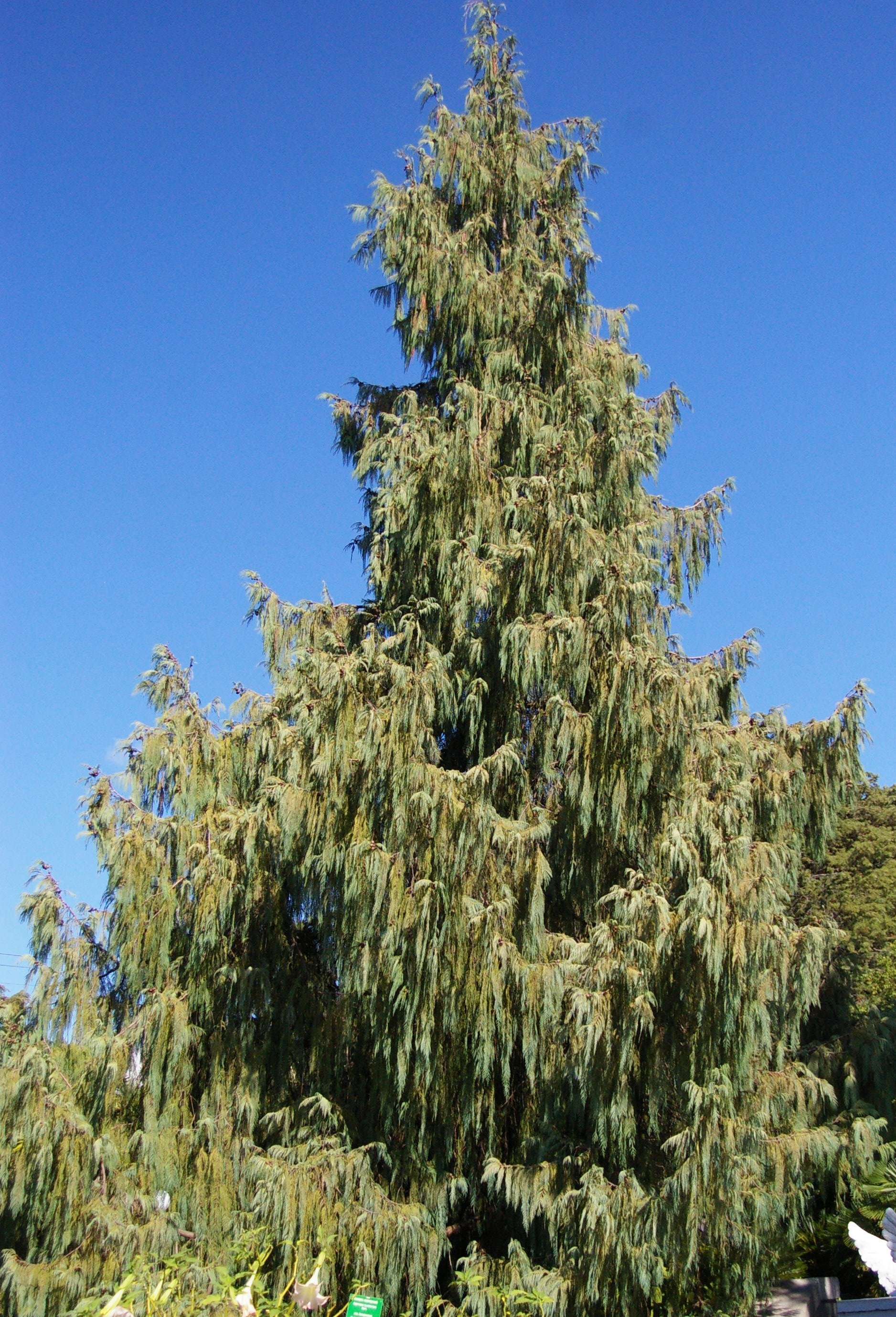

Conservation status
- Near Threatened (IUCN 3.1)

Scientific classification
- Kingdom: Plantae
- Clade: Tracheophytes
- Clade: Gymnospermae
- Division: Pinophyta
- Class: Pinopsida
- Order: Cupressales
- Family: Cupressaceae
- Genus: Cupressus
- Species: C. cashmeriana

Binomial name
- Cupressus cashmeriana Royle ex Carrière

Synonyms
- Cupressus assamica Cupressus darjeelingensis Cupressus himalaica Cupressus pseudohimalaica Cupressus tortulosa

= Cupressus cashmeriana =

Species of conifer

Cupressus cashmeriana, the Bhutan cypress or Kashmir cypress, is a species of evergreen conifer native to the eastern Himalaya in Bhutan and adjacent areas of Arunachal Pradesh in northeastern India. [ Now in vulnerable category, IUCN list retrieved in 2006 ]. It is also introduced in China and Nepal. It grows at moderately high altitudes of 1,250–2,800 metres (4,100–9,190 ft).

== Description ==
Cupressus cashmeriana is a medium-sized to large tree growing 20–45 metres (66–148 ft) tall, rarely much more, with a trunk up to 3 metres (9.8 ft) diameter. The foliage grows in strongly pendulous sprays of blue-green, very slender, flattened shoots. The leaves are scale-like, 1–2 mm long, up to 5 mm long on strong lead shoots; young trees up to about 5 years old have juvenile foliage with soft needle-like leaves 3–8 mm long.

The seed cones are ovoid, 10–21 mm long and 10–19 mm broad, with 8–12 scales, dark green, maturing dark brown about 24 months after pollination. The cones open at maturity to shed the seed. The pollen cones are 3–5 mm long, and release pollen in early spring.

A tree of 95 metres (312 ft) tall has recently been reported, but the measurements await verification.

== Conservation ==
The natural populations of this species are fragmented. There are few occurrences and they contain few large individuals. Cypress wood is in demand locally.

== Cultivation ==
Cupressus cashmeriana is widely grown horticulturally as an ornamental tree, both within its native region and internationally in temperate climates. It is planted in private gardens and public parks, although generally regarded as sensitive to drought and wind. Many of the plants available outside of its native range are named cultivars, selected for particular forms, textures, or foliage colours, such as very pendulous branching or shoots, a fastigiate or columnar shape, or a particularly bright blue or silvery glaucous foliage.

This plant has gained the Royal Horticultural Society's Award of Garden Merit (confirmed 2017). It is fully hardy only in relatively mild or coastal areas of the UK.

Some healthy specimens have been reported in Canberra, Australia.

== Symbolism ==
The Bhutan cypress is the official national tree of Bhutan, where it is often associated with Buddhist religious places. It has been widely planted around Vihara monasteries and Buddhist temples there for centuries.

== Notable specimen ==
A notable specimen of Cupressus cashmeriana is situated in front of the palace on Isola Madre, the largest of the Borromean Islands in Lake Maggiore. The seeds for the tree were sent back from the Himalayan region by a correspondent of the Borromeo family, William B. Pentland, in June 1862. By 1915, the Isola Madre specimen was noted as the best in Northern Italy and measured 60 ft. high, 6 ft. in girth, its branches covering an area of over 35 paces in circumference. In 2006, a fierce storm on the night of 28 June knocked the tree down, necessitating a multi-disciplinary effort to save it. A team of gardeners, engineers, and cable workers worked to stabilise the tree, which is the largest specimen in Europe and then weighed 70 tons with a trunk 8 metres in diameter.

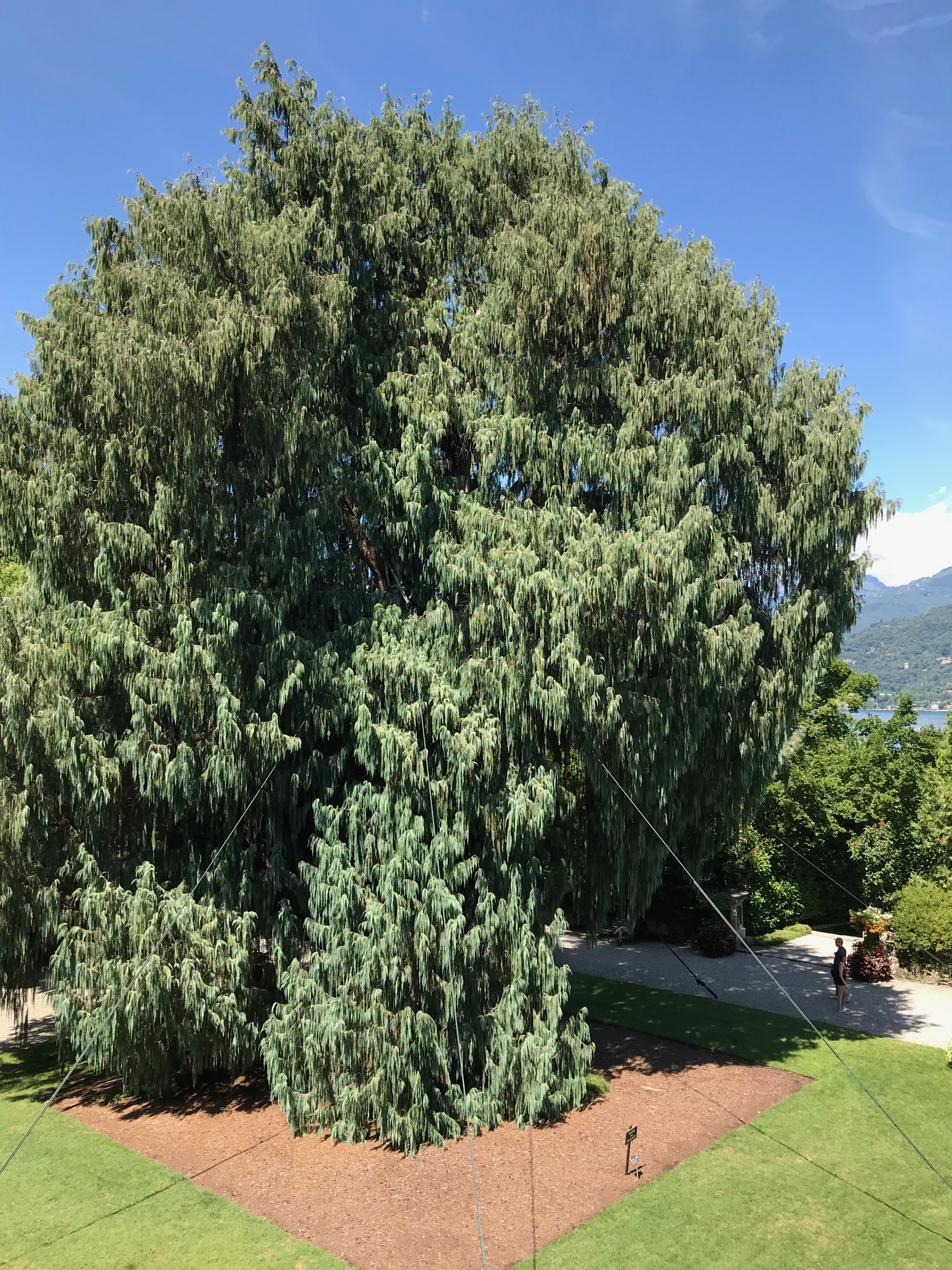
The full specimen

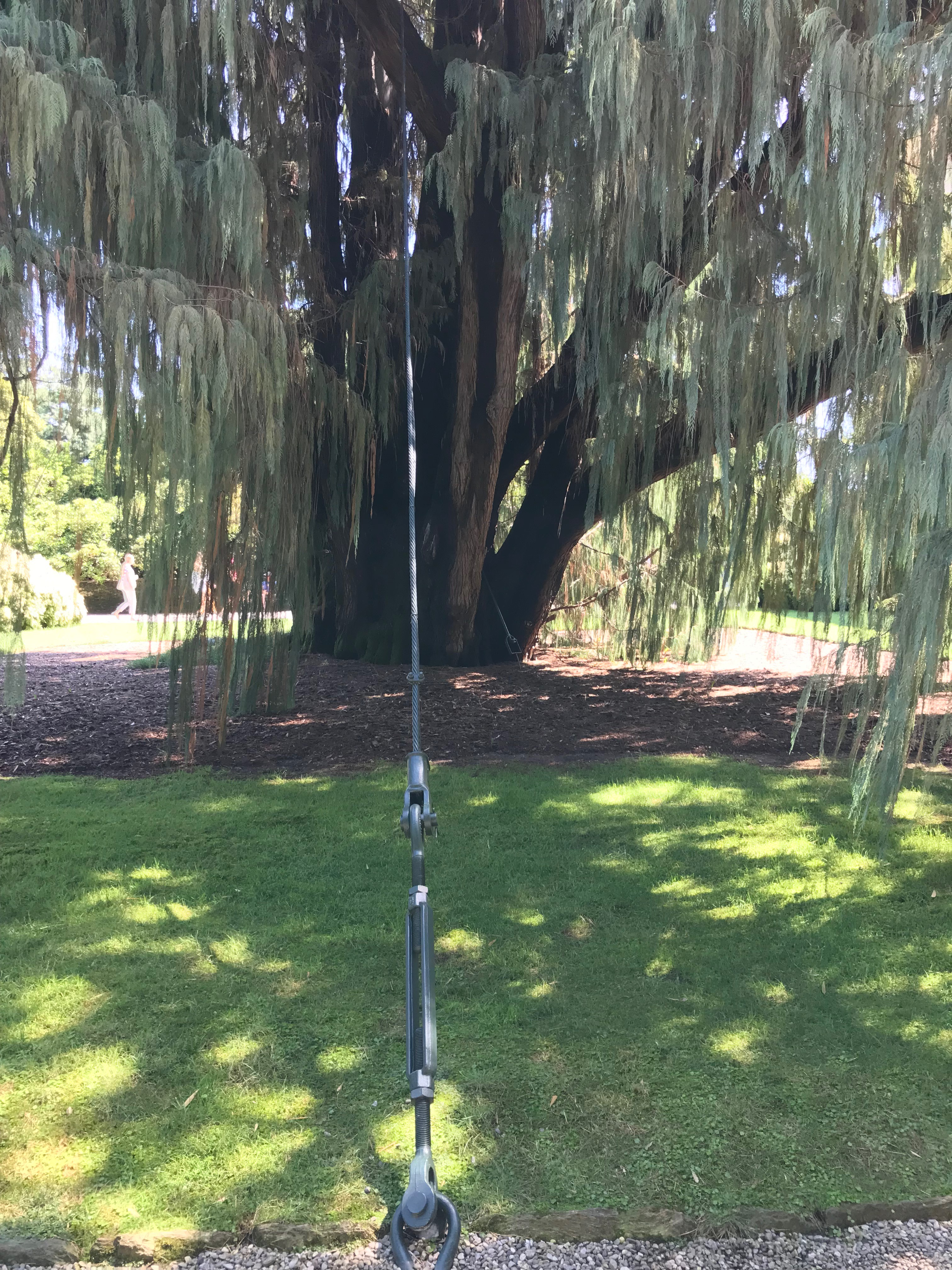
Steel rope used to stabilise the tree
