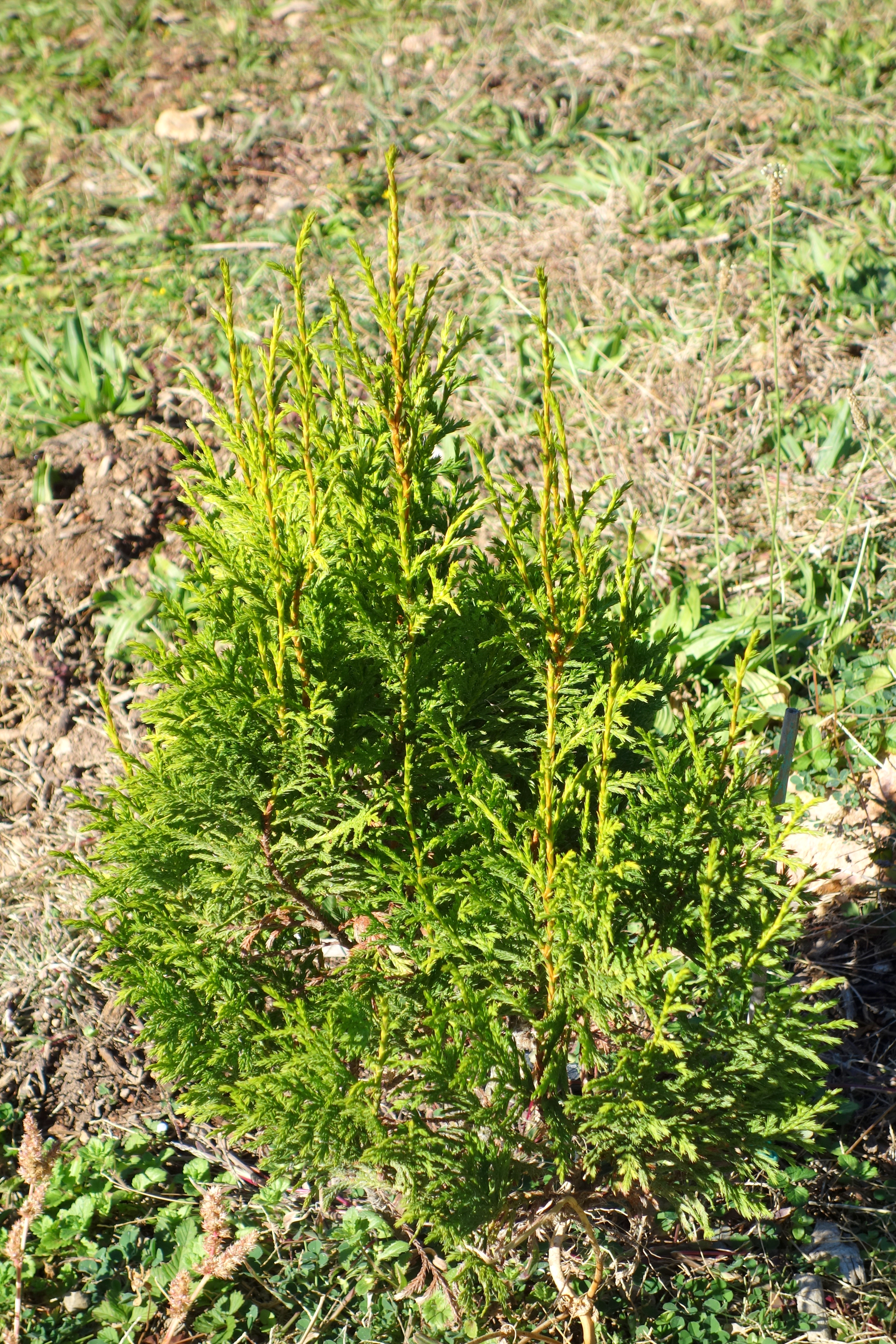

Conservation status
- Endangered (IUCN 3.1)

Scientific classification
- Kingdom: Plantae
- Clade: Tracheophytes
- Clade: Gymnosperms
- Division: Pinophyta
- Class: Pinopsida
- Order: Cupressales
- Family: Cupressaceae
- Genus: Xanthocyparis; Farjon & T.H.Nguyên
- Species: X. vietnamensis

Binomial name
- Xanthocyparis vietnamensis Farjon & T.H.Nguyên

Synonyms
- Species: Callitropsis vietnamensis (Farjon & T.H.Nguyên) D.P.Little; Cupressus vietnamensis (Farjon & T.H.Nguyên) Silba

= Xanthocyparis =

Genus of conifers in the family Cupressaceae

Xanthocyparis is a monotypic genus of conifer in the cypress family, Cupressaceae, with the sole species Xanthocyparis vietnamensis, the Vietnamese golden cypress, native to Vietnam and southeastern China. The Nootka cypress, Callitropsis nootkatensis, was also formerly placed in the genus, but this has been rejected.

== Taxonomy ==
In 2002, Aljos Farjon and others described the new genus Xanthocyparis to accommodate the new Vietnamese species X. vietnamensis and another species, the Nootka cypress, which had been formerly included in the genus Chamaecyparis as C. nootkatensis. This was based in part on the discovery that C. nootkatensis was more closely related to the genus Cupressus than to Chamaecyparis.

In 2004, Damon Little and others, while confirming the above relationship with further evidence, pointed out that as circumscribed by Farjon et al., Xanthocyparis included the type species of Callitropsis (Cupressus nootkatensis, a synonym of Chamaecyparis nootkatensis and Xanthocyparis nootkatensis). Callitropsis had been described by Anders Sandøe Ørsted in 1864, but this name had been overlooked by Farjon and most other authors; under the rules of the International Code of Botanical Nomenclature, Callitropsis as the earlier-published name had nomenclatural priority over Xanthocyparis if that genus included Cupressus nootkatensis. Little et al. therefore recognized Xanthocyparis as a synonym of Callitropsis. The name Xanthocyparis was proposed for conservation over Callitropsis, a decision that was ratified at the International Botanical Congress in 2011.

Little et al. also presented evidence that Cupressus is paraphyletic with respect to Juniperus and Xanthocyparis, with the North American species of Cupressus being more closely related to Xanthocyparis than they are to the European and Asian Cupressus species. These species were transferred to Callitropsis by Damon Little in 2006, although this transfer was not universally accepted. In 2009, most of the North American species previously included in Callitropsis were placed in a separate genus, Hesperocyparis.

A 2021 molecular study found Xanthocyparis to be sister to a clade comprising Hesperocyparis and Callitropsis, with the clade containing all three being sister to a clade comprising Juniperus and Cupressus sensu stricto.

== Distribution ==
Xanthocyparis vietnamensis was originally described as endemic to Vietnam, being native only to the karst limestone mountains of the Hà Giang Province in northern Vietnam. It has since also been recorded in Cao Bằng and Tuyên Quang provinces in Vietnam, as well as southeast China (Guangxi).
