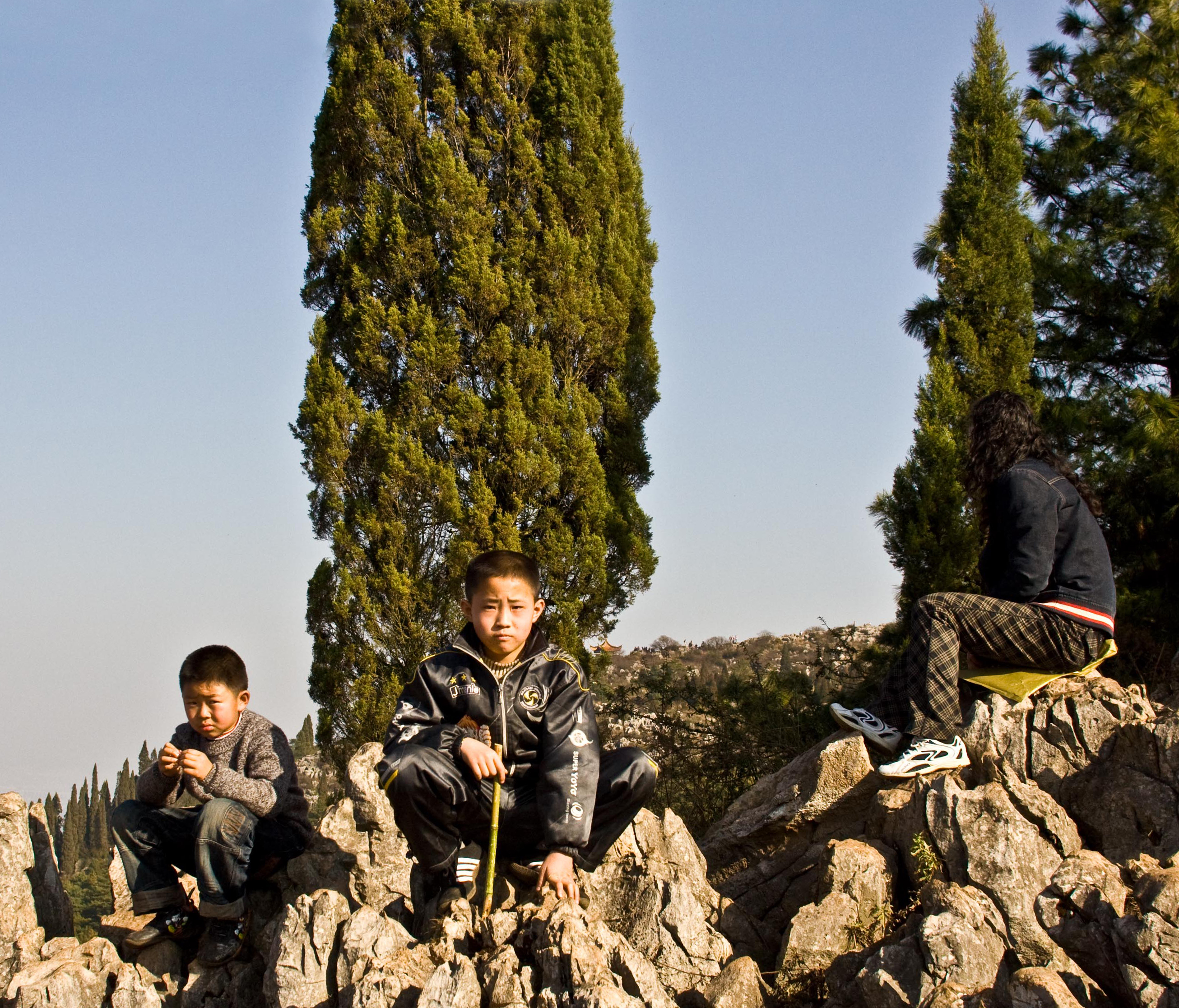

Conservation status
- Data Deficient (IUCN 3.1)

Scientific classification
- Kingdom: Plantae
- Clade: Tracheophytes
- Clade: Gymnosperms
- Division: Pinophyta
- Class: Pinopsida
- Order: Cupressales
- Family: Cupressaceae
- Genus: Cupressus
- Species: C. duclouxiana

Binomial name
- Cupressus duclouxiana Hickel

= Cupressus duclouxiana =

Species of conifer

Cupressus duclouxiana, the Chinese cypress or Yunnan cypress, is a species of conifer in the cypress family, Cupressaceae. It is endemic to China, where it is known from Yunnan and Sichuan. It grows in deep river gorges. Its habitat is mountain forest where it occurs alongside the Sikang pine (Pinus densata) and various oaks, chinquapins, and chestnuts.

Most old-growth stands of this tree have been cut down, and it is still threatened by logging in many areas. In May 2023, a Yunnan cypress was identified as the tallest tree in Asia at 102.3 meters.
