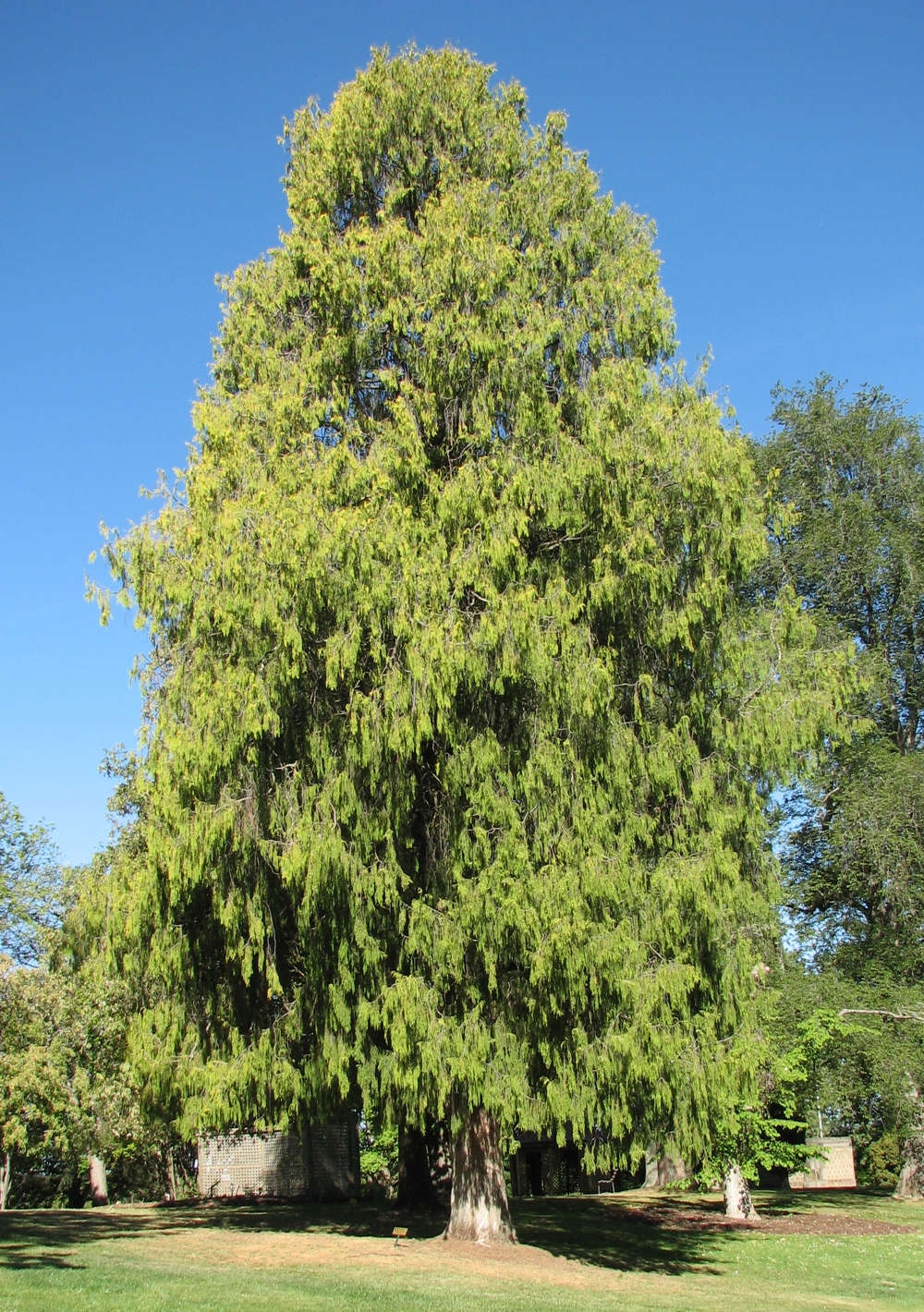

Conservation status
- Data Deficient (IUCN 3.1)

Scientific classification
- Kingdom: Plantae
- Clade: Tracheophytes
- Clade: Gymnospermae
- Division: Pinophyta
- Class: Pinopsida
- Order: Cupressales
- Family: Cupressaceae
- Genus: Cupressus
- Species: C. funebris

Binomial name
- Cupressus funebris Endl.

Synonyms
- Chamaecyparis funebris; Cupressus pendula; Platycyparis funebris

= Cupressus funebris =

Species of conifer

Cupressus funebris, the Chinese weeping cypress, is a species of cypress native to southwestern and central China. It may also occur naturally in Vietnam.

== Description ==
Cupressus funebris is a medium-sized coniferous tree growing to 20–35 m tall, with a trunk up to 2 m diameter. The foliage grows in dense, usually moderately decumbent and pendulous sprays of bright green, very slender, slightly flattened shoots.

The leaves are scale-like, 1–2 mm long, up to 5 mm long on strong lead shoots; young trees up to about 5–10 years old have juvenile foliage with soft needle-like leaves 3–8 mm long.

The seed cones are globose, 8–15 mm long, with 6–10 scales (usually 8), green, maturing dark brown about 24 months after pollination. The cones open at maturity to shed the seed. The pollen cones are 3–5 mm long, and release pollen in early spring.

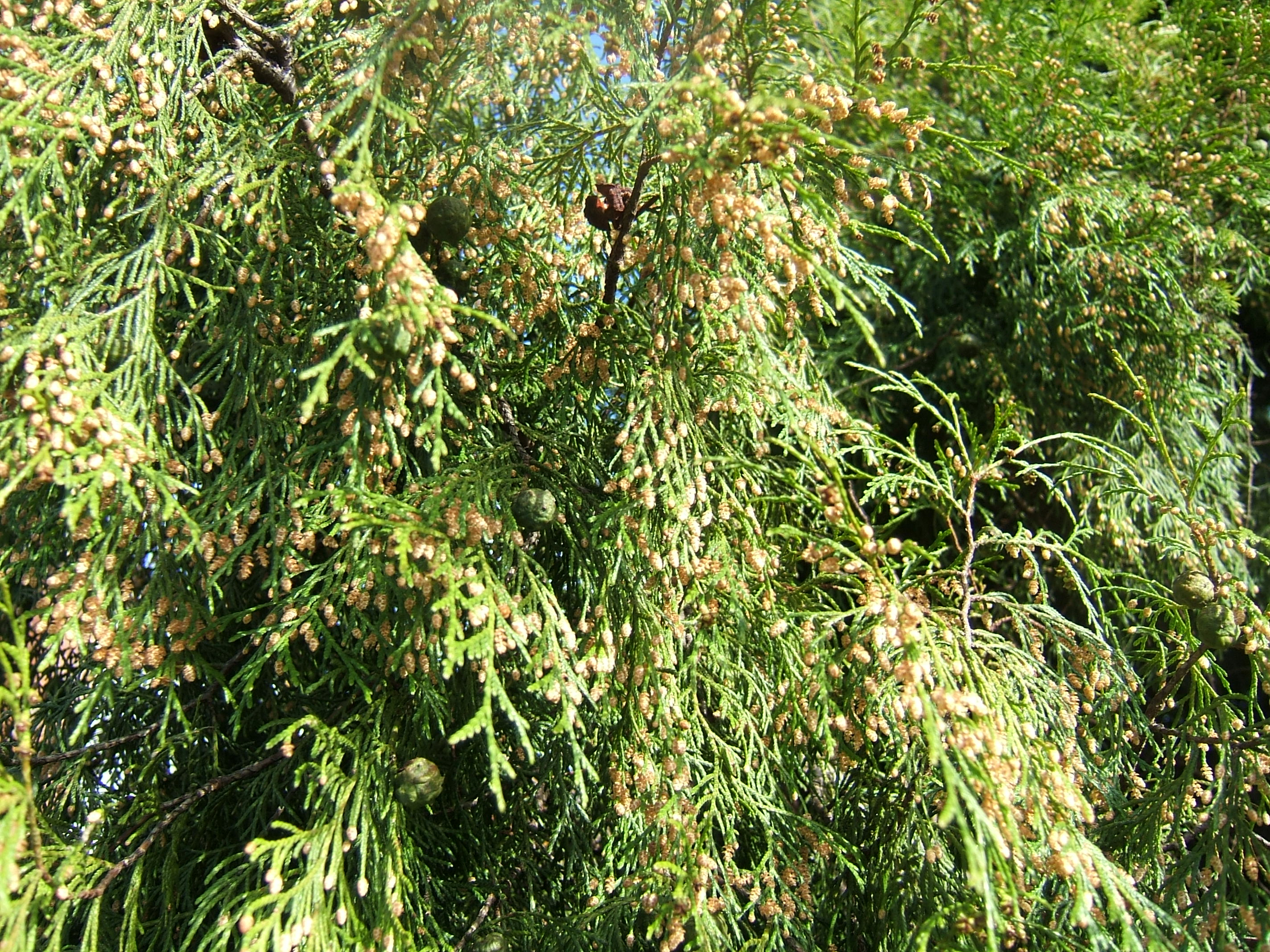
Foliage with pollen and seed cones

== Distribution ==
The precise natural range of Cupressus funebris is uncertain due to a long history of cultivation. Trees are recorded from forest habitats in the provinces of Guizhou, Hunan, and Chongqing.

More generally, it also occurs in Anhui, Fujian, southern Gansu, Guangdong, Guangxi, Henan, Hubei, Jiangxi, Shaanxi, Sichuan, Yunnan, and Zhejiang, typically planted around monasteries and temples or in gardens.

Whether Cupressus funebris naturally occurs also in northern Vietnam is uncertain; if so, it probably is the most threatened conifer of that country.

== Cultivation ==
Cupressus funebris is cultivated as an ornamental tree, due to its graciously weeping form and texture, and planted in gardens and public parks in other warm temperate regions, such as California. It is used as a houseplant and conservatory tree in colder climates.
