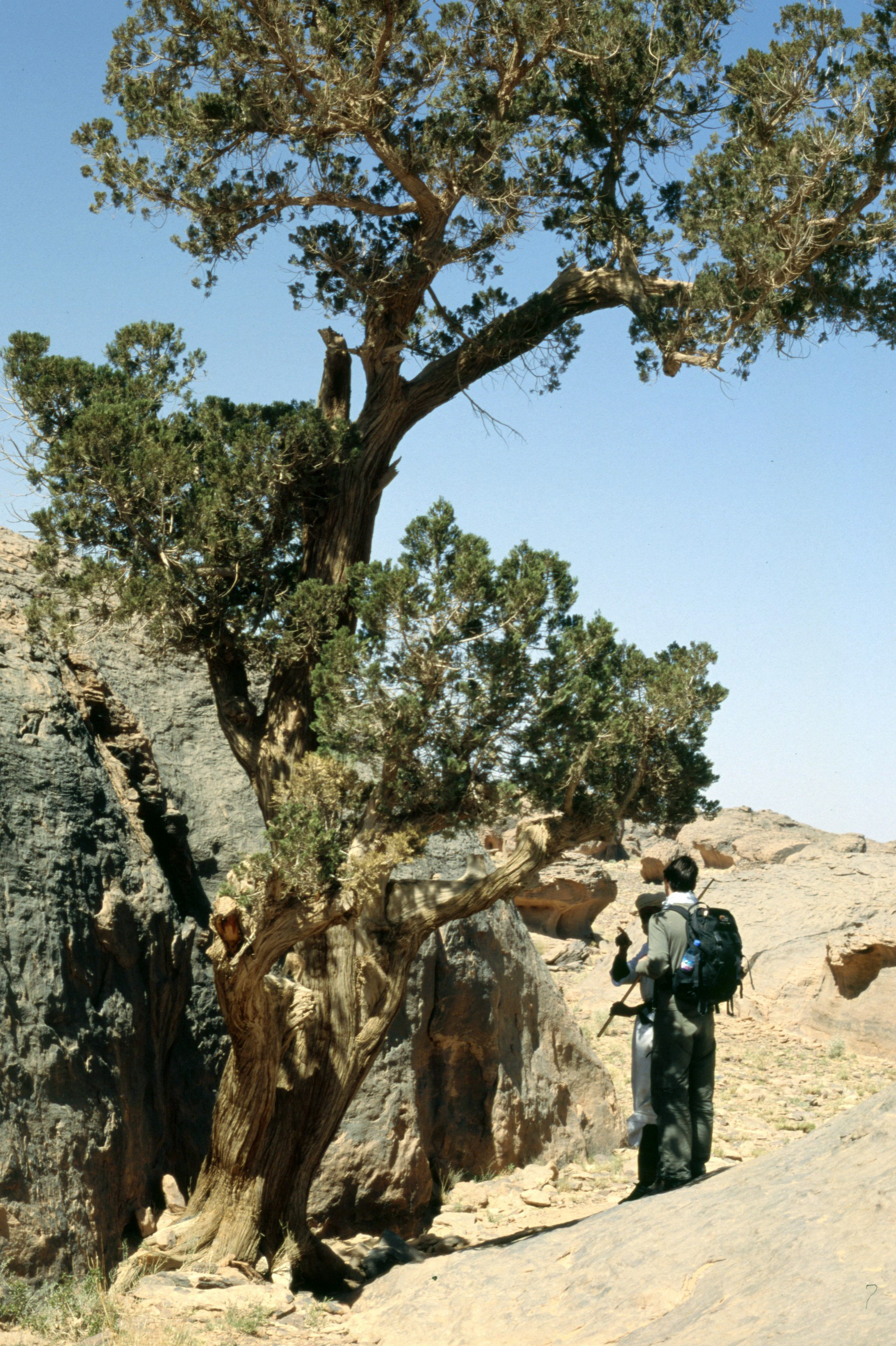

Conservation status
- Critically Endangered (IUCN 3.1)

Scientific classification
- Kingdom: Plantae
- Clade: Tracheophytes
- Clade: Gymnosperms
- Division: Pinophyta
- Class: Pinopsida
- Order: Cupressales
- Family: Cupressaceae
- Genus: Cupressus
- Species: C. dupreziana

Binomial name
- Cupressus dupreziana A.Camus
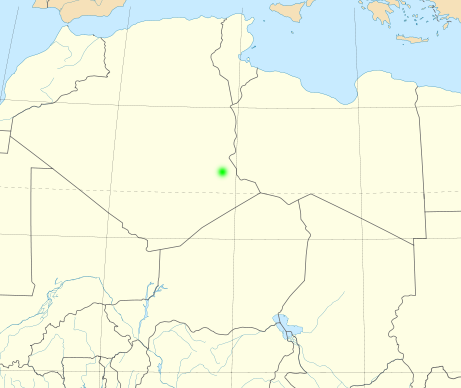
- Range of Cupressus dupreziana

= Cupressus dupreziana =

Species of coniferous tree

Cupressus dupreziana, the Saharan cypress, or tarout, is a very rare coniferous tree in the cypress family, Cupressaceae, native to the Tassili n'Ajjer mountains in the central Sahara desert of southeast Algeria, where it forms a unique population of trees hundreds of kilometres from any other trees. The largest is about 22 m tall, but has now lost its top. The majority are estimated to be over 2000 years old, with very little regeneration due to the increasing desertification of the Sahara. Rainfall totals in the area are estimated to be about 30 mm annually. The largest one is named Tin-Balalan is believed to be the oldest tarout tree with a circumference of 12 metres (39 ft). Surveys between 1997–2001 located 233 specimens of this endangered species, with a decline to 212 in March 2026 with the deaths of 21 large trees in recent severe drought, and no new regeneration has been recorded for over 30 years. All of the trees are now mapped and measured; the current tallest is now 20.4 m.

This species is distinct from the allied Cupressus sempervirens (Mediterranean cypress) in its much bluer foliage with a white resin spot on each leaf, the smaller shoots often being flattened in a single plane. It also has smaller cones, only 1.5–2.5 cm long. Cupressus atlantica (Moroccan cypress) is more similar, and is treated as a variety of the Saharan cypress (C. dupreziana var. atlantica) by some authors.

Probably as a result of its isolation and low population, the Saharan cypress has evolved a unique reproductive system of male apomixis whereby the seeds develop entirely from the genetic content of the pollen. There is no genetic input from the female "parent", which only provides nutritional sustenance. The Moroccan cypress does not share this characteristic.

The Saharan cypress is occasionally cultivated in southern and western Europe, in part for ex situ genetic conservation, but also as an ornamental tree.

An international arboretum is being established in Canberra, Australian Capital Territory (ACT), Australia within which will be established forests of rare and endangered species from throughout the world. One of these forests is dedicated to Cupressus dupreziana and 1300 of the trees have been propagated for planting in late 2007.
