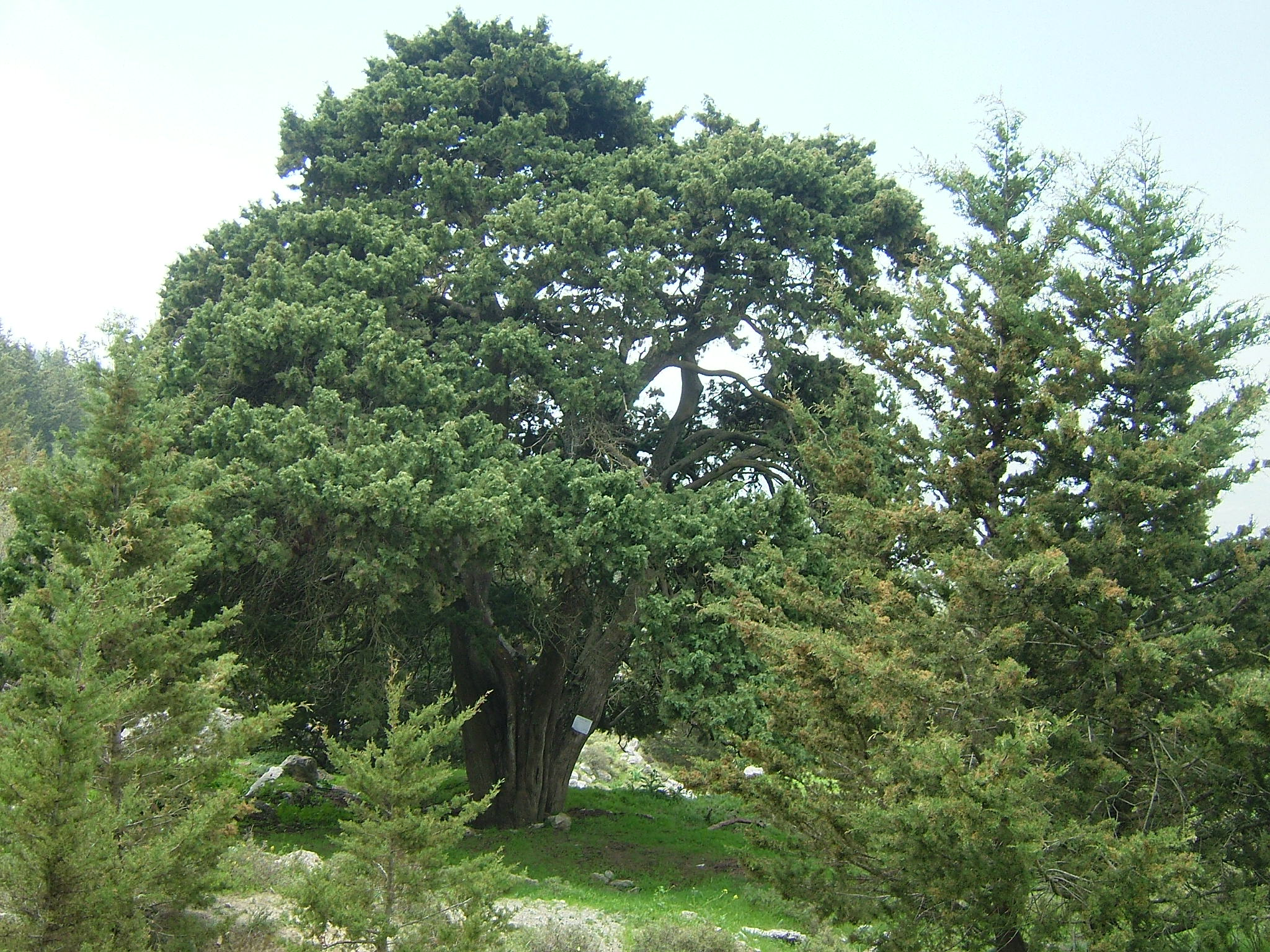
- Cupressus sempervirens

Scientific classification
- Kingdom: Plantae
- Clade: Tracheophytes
- Clade: Gymnosperms
- Division: Pinophyta
- Class: Pinopsida
- Order: Cupressales
- Family: Cupressaceae
- Subfamily: Cupressoideae
- Genus: Cupressus; L.

Type species
- Cupressus sempervirens L.

Species
- See text

Synonyms
- Platycyparis A.V.Bobrov & Melikyan (2006); Tassilicyparis A.V.Bobrov & Melikyan (2006)

= Cupressus =

Several genera of evergreen conifers

Cupressus, is the genus of the cypresses, a type of conifers in the cypress family, Cupressaceae. It is currently considered a polyphyletic group. Based on genetic and morphological analysis, the genus Cupressus is in the subfamily Cupressoideae.

As currently treated, cypresses are native plants in scattered localities in mainly warm temperate climate regions in the Northern Hemisphere, including northwest Africa, the Middle East, the Himalayas, southern China and northern Vietnam. As with other conifers, extensive cultivation has led to a wide variety of forms, sizes and colours, that are grown in parks and gardens worldwide.

== Description ==
Cypress are evergreen trees or large shrubs, growing to 5–40 m (16–131 ft) tall, exceptionally up to 102 m tall (the second-tallest tree species on earth, after Sequoia sempervirens) in Cupressus austrotibetica. The leaves are scale-like, 2–6 mm long, arranged in opposite decussate pairs, and persist for three to five years. On young plants up to two years old, the leaves are needle-like and 5–15 mm long. The cones are 8–40 mm long, globose or ovoid with 4 to 14 scales arranged in opposite decussate pairs; they are mature in 18–24 months from pollination. The seeds are small, 4–7 mm long, with two narrow wings, one along each side of the seed.

Many of the species are adapted to forest fires, holding their seeds for many years in closed cones until the parent trees are killed by a fire; the seeds are then released to colonise the bare, burnt ground. In other species, the cones open at maturity to release the seeds.

== Cultivation ==
Many species of cypress are grown as decorative trees in parks and, in Asia, around temples; in some areas, the native distribution is hard to discern due to extensive cultivation. A few species are grown for their timber, which can be very durable. The fast-growing hybrid Leyland cypress (Cupressus × leylandii), much used in gardens, draws one of its parents from this genus (Cupressus macrocarpa, Monterey cypress); the other parent, Callitropsis nootkatensis (Nootka cypress), is also sometimes classified in this genus, or else in the separate genus Xanthocyparis, but in the past more usually in Chamaecyparis.

== Cultural references ==
Type species Cupressus sempervirens found across the Mediterranean to West Asia has various legends connected to peoples of within its range. The common name "cypress" comes via the Old French cipres from cyparissus latinized of Greek Κυπάρισσος Kupárissos: Kupárissos was Apollo's lover who was unconsolable after killing a stag by mistake during a hunting trip thus, was turned into a tree. From this, it became sacred to the gods and it is a Hellenic emblem of grief. The association with mourning continued in Roman times, up to the present day, also for a practical reason: the roots of the cypress are straight into the ground, and expand slightly laterally, not damaging the burials. Roman households would hang sprigs of cypress and pine by the doors in mourning of passing family. In Zoroastrian tradition (per Daqiqi), a cypress (سرو sarv) sapling was gifted by Zoroaster to Vishtaspa (or Goshtashp) to be planted near the first fire temple in commemoration of his following. Cypress cones are fertility symbols associated with a tree of life to Assyrians often seen in their pottery.

A Talmudic semantic drift in the Hebrew term אֶרֶז érez "cedar" norm of the stories of Abraham to the Israelites to any barren tree has led to a conflation with cypresses (בְּרוֹשׁ berṓsh) sharing same qualities in modern Jewish symbolism from the 19th century. This may have influenced Theodor Herzl planting a cypress in a friend's farm in Motza in 1898 as a politically affirming move in his Zionist settling project of Mandate Palestine.

== Taxonomy ==
There has long been significant uncertainty about the New World members of Cupressus, with several studies recovering them as forming a distinct clade from the Old World members. A 2021 molecular study found Cupressus to be the sister genus to Juniperus, whereas the western members (classified in Callitropsis and Hesperocyparis) were found to be sister to Xanthocyparis.

=== Phylogeny ===
Stull et al. 2021

- - Juniperus
  - - Cupressus s.l.
      - - Cupressus s.s.
          - - C. pendula Thunberg
            - C. tonkinensis Silba
          - - - C. sempervirens von Linné
              - - C. atlantica Gaussen
                - C. dupreziana Camus
            - - C. chengiana Hu
              - - - C. duclouxiana Hickel
                  - C. gigantea Cheng & Fu
                - - C. torulosa Don ex Lambert
                  - - C. cashmeriana Royle ex Carrière
                    - - C. austrotibetica Silba
                      - C. corneyana Knight & Perry ex Carrière
      - - - Xanthocyparis
            C. vietnamensis (Farjon & Nguyên 2002) Silba
        - - Callitropsis
            C. nootkatensis Don
          - Hesperocyparis
            - C. bakeri Jepson
            - - - C. macnabiana Murray
                - - C. goveniana Go
                  - - C. macrocarpa Hartweg ex Gordon
                    - C. sargentii Jepson
              - - C. glabra Sudworth
                - - C. arizonica Greene
                  - - C. guadalupensis Watson
                    - - C. montana Wiggins
                      - - C. forbesii Jepson
                        - - C. lusitanica Miller
                          - C. stephensonii Wolf

=== Species ===
The number of species recognised within this genus varies sharply, from 16 to 25 or more according to the authority followed, because most populations are small and isolated, and whether they should be accorded specific, subspecific or varietal rank is difficult to ascertain. Current tendencies are to reduce the number of recognised species; when a narrow species concept is adopted, the varieties indented in the list below may also be accepted as distinct species. See also the New World species (below) for a likely split in the genus in the future.

==== Old World species ====
The Old World cypresses tend to have cones with more scales (8–14 scales, rarely 6 in C. funebris), each scale with a short broad ridge, not a spike. C. sempervirens is the type species of the genus, defining the name Cupressus. They are more closely related to Juniperus than to the New World species, with the exception of the Vietnamese golden cypress, which is more closely related to New World species.

Image	Cone	Name	Common name	Distribution
		Cupressus atlantica	Moroccan cypress	western Morocco
		Cupressus cashmeriana	Bhutan cypress	eastern Himalaya in Bhutan and adjacent areas of Arunachal Pradesh in northeastern India
		Cupressus chengiana	Cheng's cypress	Gansu and Sichuan Provinces, China
		Cupressus duclouxiana (syn: Cupressus austrotibetica)	Yunnan cypress, South Tibet cypress	Yunnan and Sichuan, China
		Cupressus dupreziana	Saharan cypress	southeast Algeria
		Cupressus funebris	Chinese weeping cypress	southwestern and central China
		Cupressus gigantea	Tibetan cypress	Southeast Tibet - China
		Cupressus sempervirens	Mediterranean cypress, type species	northeast Libya, southern Albania, coastal Bulgaria, southern Ukraine (Crimea), coastal Croatia, southern Montenegro, southern Bosnia and Herzegovina, southern Greece, southern Turkey, Cyprus, northern Egypt, western Syria, Lebanon, Malta, Italy, Tunisia, Israel, Palestine, western Jordan, and Iran
		Cupressus torulosa (syn: Cupressus tonkinensis)	Tonkin cypress, Himalayan cypress	Sichuan of China and in Vietnam
		Cupressus vietnamensis (syn: Xanthocyparis vietnamensis)	Vietnamese cypress, Vietnamese golden cypress	Vietnam

==== New World species ====
The New World cypresses tend to have cones with fewer scales (4–8 scales, rarely more in C. macrocarpa), each scale with an often prominent narrow spike. Recent genetic evidence shows they are less closely related to the Old World cypresses than previously thought, being more closely related to Xanthocyparis than to the rest of Cupressus. These species have recently been transferred to Hesperocyparis and Callitropsis. New World species are found in marginal habitats with xeric soils, and therefore exhibit a fragmented allopatric pattern of distribution. This type of distribution results in disproportionate local abundance with most species restricted to small neighboring populations.

Image	Cone	Name	Common name	Distribution
		Cupressus abramsiana (Cupressus goveniana var. abramsiana; Callitropsis abramsiana;)	Santa Cruz cypress	Santa Cruz Mountains of Santa Cruz and San Mateo Counties in west-central California
		Cupressus arizonica (Callitropsis arizonica)	Arizona cypress	southwestern United States (Arizona, Utah, southwestern New Mexico, and southern California, with a few populations in southern Nevada and in the Chisos Mountains of western Texas), and in Mexico (Coahuila, Nuevo León, Chihuahua, Sonora, Durango, Tamaulipas, Zacatecas and northern Baja California).
		Cupressus bakeri (Callitropsis bakeri)	Modoc cypress	northern California and extreme southwestern Oregon
		Cupressus forbesii (Callitropsis forbesii)	Tecate cypress	Santa Ana Mountains of Orange County and in San Diego County within Southern California, and in northern Baja California state of Mexico.
		Cupressus glabra (Callitropsis glabra)	smooth Arizona cypress	Sedona, Arizona
		Cupressus goveniana (Callitropsis goveniana)	Gowen cypress, Californian cypress	Monterey County, California
		Cupressus guadalupensis (Callitropsis guadalupensis )	Guadalupe cypress	Mexico, found only on Guadalupe Island
		Cupressus lusitanica (Callitropsis lusitanica )	Mexican cypress	Mexico and Central America (Guatemala, El Salvador and Honduras)
		Cupressus macnabiana (Callitropsis macnabiana )	Macnab cypress	northern California
		Cupressus macrocarpa (Callitropsis macrocarpa )	Monterey cypress	Cypress Point in Pebble Beach and at Point Lobos near Carmel, California
		Cupressus nevadensis (Callitropsis nevadensis )	Piute cypress	Southern Sierra Nevada, within Kern County, California and Tulare County.
		Cupressus nootkatensis (syn: Xanthocyparis nootkatensis)	Nootka cypress	Vancouver Island, British Columbia, Canada
		Cupressus pygmaea (Cupressus goveniana var. pygmaea; Callitropsis pigmaea )	Mendocino cypress	Mendocino and Sonoma Counties in northwestern California
		Cupressus revealiana	El Rincon cypress	Baja California in northwestern Mexico
		Cupressus sargentii (Callitropsis sargentii)	Sargent cypress	Mendocino County southwards to Santa Barbara County California
		Cupressus stephensonii (Callitropsis stephensonii )	Cuyamaca cypress	San Diego County California

== Allergenic potential ==
All plants in the genus Cupressus, including New World Cupressus (now Callitropsis), are extremely allergenic, and have an OPALS allergy scale rating of 10. In warm, Mediterranean climates, these plants release large quantities of pollen for approximately seven months each year.
