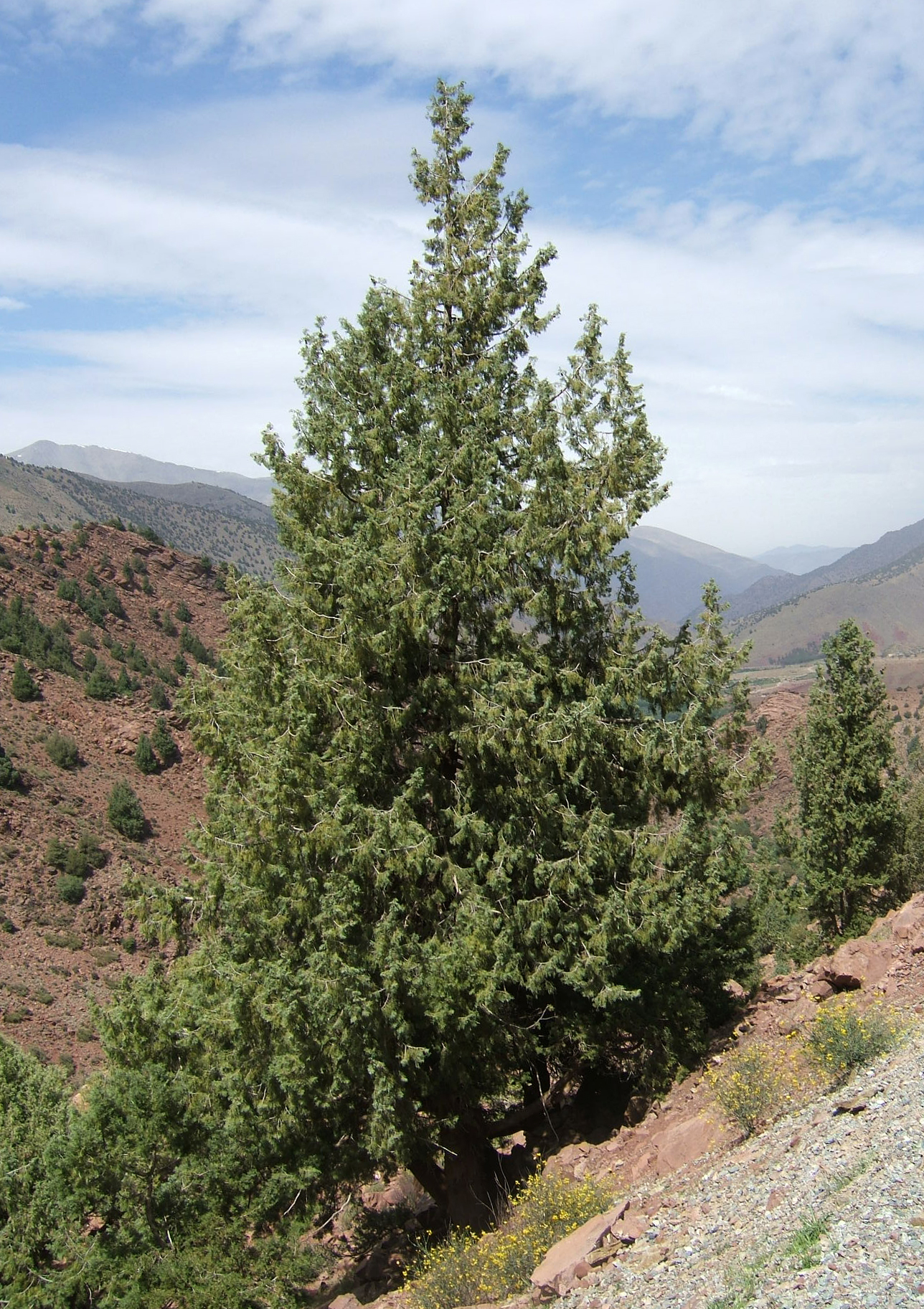

Conservation status
- Critically Endangered (IUCN 3.1)

Scientific classification
- Kingdom: Plantae
- Clade: Tracheophytes
- Clade: Gymnosperms
- Division: Pinophyta
- Class: Pinopsida
- Order: Cupressales
- Family: Cupressaceae
- Genus: Cupressus
- Species: C. atlantica

Binomial name
- Cupressus atlantica Gaussen

Synonyms
- C. dupreziana var. atlantica (Gaussen) Silba

= Cupressus atlantica =

Species of conifer

Cupressus atlantica, the Moroccan cypress, is a rare coniferous tree endemic to the valley of the Oued n'Fiss river in the High Atlas Mountains south of Marrakesh in western Morocco. The majority are old, with very little regeneration due to overgrazing by goats, and they are critically endangered.

This species is distinct from the allied Cupressus sempervirens (Mediterranean cypress) in its much bluer foliage with a white resin spot on each leaf, the smaller shoots often being flattened in a single plane. It also has smaller, globose cones, only 1.5-2.5 cm long. Cupressus dupreziana (Saharan cypress) is more similar, and C. atlantica is treated as a variety of it (C. dupreziana var. atlantica) by some authors. Moroccan cypress does not however share the unique reproductive system of male apomixis found in Saharan cypress.
