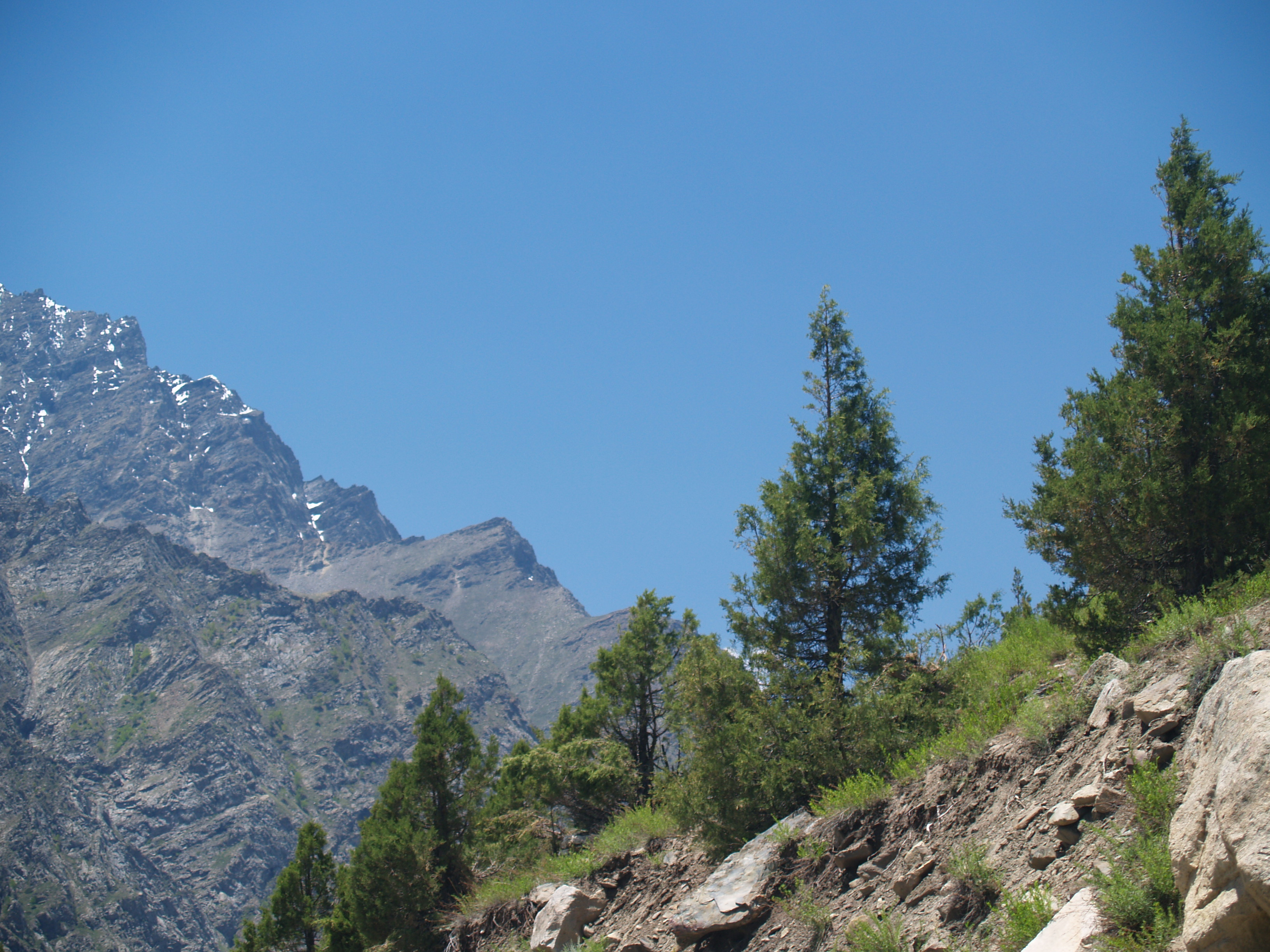
- By Manali-Leh Highway, Himachal Pradesh, India

Conservation status
- Least Concern (IUCN 3.1)

Scientific classification
- Kingdom: Plantae
- Clade: Tracheophytes
- Clade: Gymnosperms
- Division: Pinophyta
- Class: Pinopsida
- Order: Cupressales
- Family: Cupressaceae
- Genus: Cupressus
- Species: C. torulosa

Binomial name
- Cupressus torulosa D.Don ex Lamb.

Synonyms
- Athrotaxis joucadan Carrière; Cupressus balfouriana W.Bull; Cupressus doniana Hook.f.; Cupressus karnaliensis Silba; Cupressus majestica Knight; Cupressus nepalensis Loudon; Cupressus tournefortii Ten.; Thuja curviramea Miq.

= Cupressus torulosa =

Himalayan cypress

Species of conifer

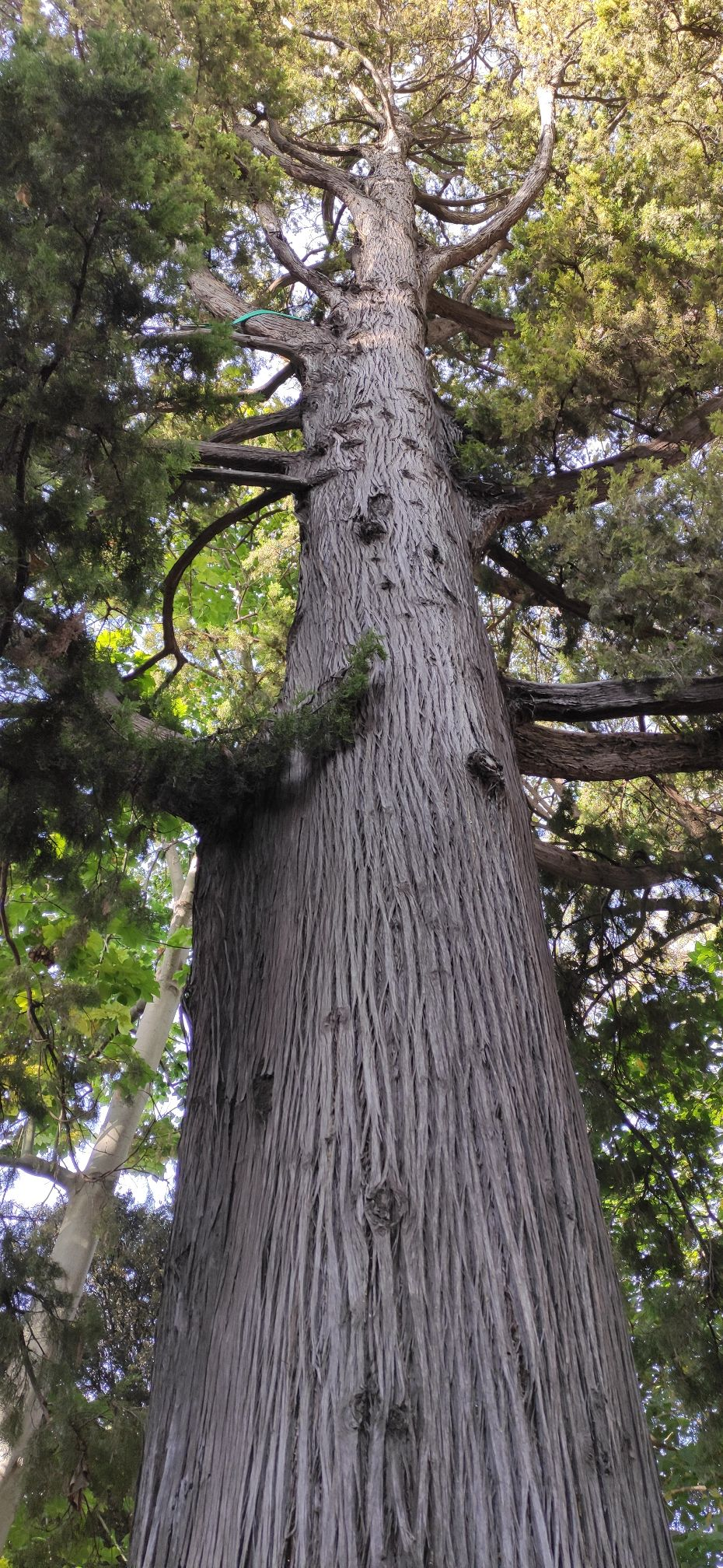
In Botanical Garden of Valencia, Spain

Cupressus torulosa, the Himalayan cypress or Bhutan cypress, is a species of conifer in the family Cupressaceae, a cypress tree native to the mountainous northern regions of the Indian subcontinent, in the western Himalayas.

== Description ==
It is a medium to extremely large coniferous tree with scale-like leaves typically growing up to 45 m (150 ft) in height, with a trunk up to 3.5 m diameter at breast height. (~11 ft 5)

== Distribution ==
Cupressus torulosa is a coniferous tree species found on limestone terrain in the western Himalaya at 300–2,800 m (1,000–9,200 ft). Information on its distribution further east is conflicting. It may occur in Vietnam. However, according to Conifers of Vietnam, only cultivated trees exist there.
