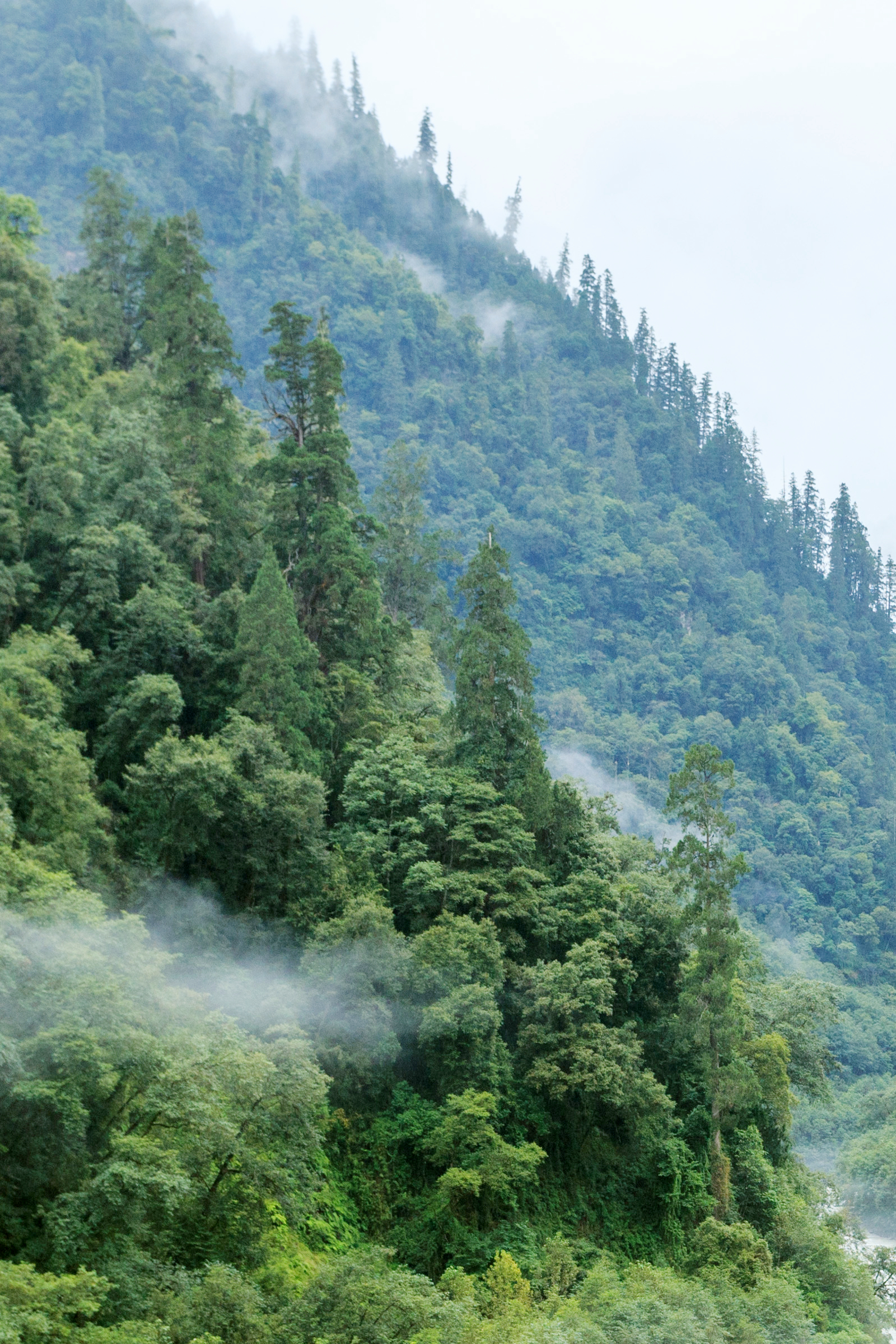
- Cupressus austrotibetica tall emergent trees in the Parlung Tsangpo valley in Tibet

Scientific classification
- Kingdom: Plantae
- Clade: Tracheophytes
- Clade: Gymnosperms
- Division: Pinophyta
- Class: Pinopsida
- Order: Cupressales
- Family: Cupressaceae
- Genus: Cupressus
- Species: C. austrotibetica

Binomial name
- Cupressus austrotibetica Silba

= Cupressus austrotibetica =

Species of conifer

Cupressus austrotibetica is a species of conifer in the family Cupressaceae. It is a cypress tree native to the deep valleys of the Yarlung Tsangpo Grand Canyon area in the south of Tibet. The species name translates as 'south Tibetan cypress'.

== Description ==
It is a large to extremely large tree, growing up to 102 metres tall, making it the second tallest tree species on Earth after Sequoia sempervirens. The bark is thick, grey-brown, vertically furrowed. It is distinguished from other Cupressus species by its extremely slender, thread-like shoots under 1 mm thick, and small cones just 12-16 mm long and under 12 mm diameter, with 8–12 scales.

== Distribution ==
Cupressus austrotibetica is native to the Yarlung Tsangpo Grand Canyon system, particularly its tributary the Parlung Tsangpo, at 1980-2800 m altitude.
