= List of California native plants =

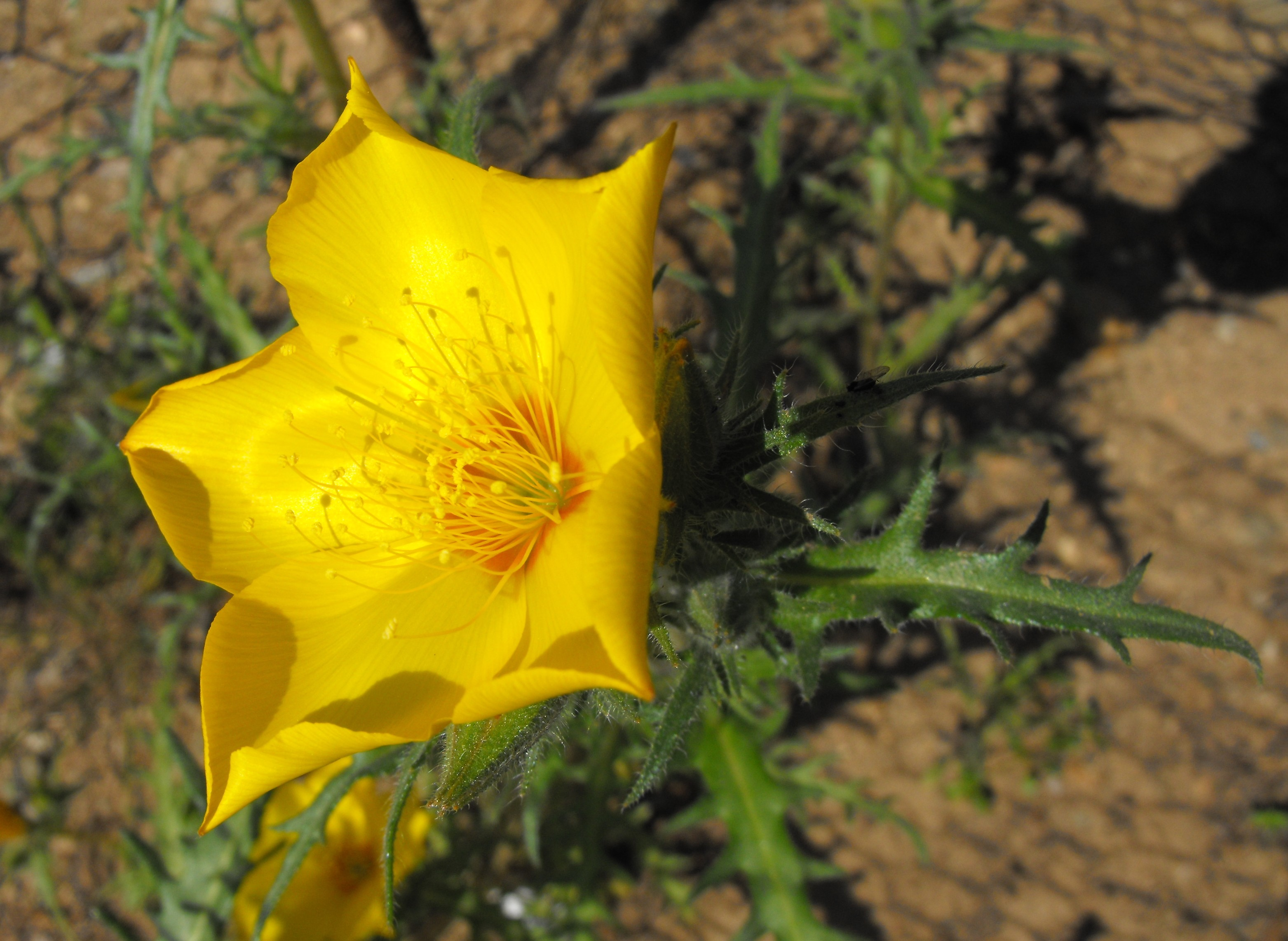
Native wildflower blazing star (Mentzelia lindleyi)

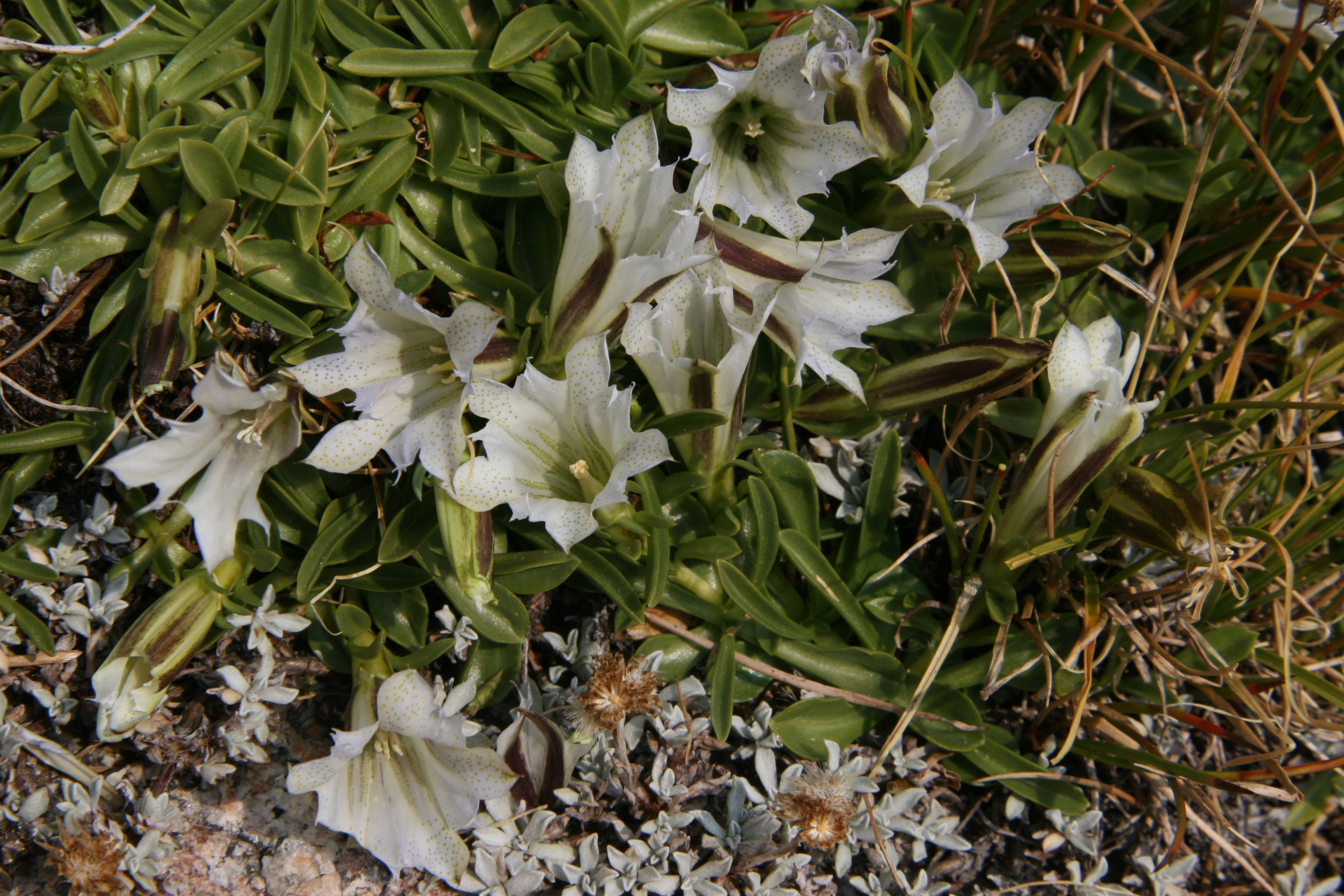
Gentiana newberryi in the Sierra Nevada

California native plants are plants that existed in California prior to the arrival of European explorers and colonists in the late 18th century. California includes parts of at least three phytochoria. The largest is the California floristic province, a geographical area that covers most of California, portions of neighboring Oregon, Nevada, and Baja California, and is regarded as a "world hotspot" of biodiversity.

== Introduction ==
In 1993, The Jepson Manual estimated that California was home to 4,693 native species and 1,169 native subspecies or varieties, including 1,416 endemic species. A 2001 study by the California Native Plant Society estimated 6,300 native plants. These estimates continue to change over time.

Of California's total plant population, 2,153 species, subspecies, and varieties are endemic and native to California alone, according to the 1993 Jepson Manual study. This botanical diversity stems not only from the size of the state, but also its diverse topographies, climates, and soils (e.g. serpentine outcrops). Numerous plant groupings exist in California, and botanists work to structure them into identifiable ecoregions, plant communities, vegetation types, and habitats, and taxonomies.

California native plants include some that have widespread horticultural use. Sometimes the appreciation began outside of California—lupines, California fuchsias, and California poppies were first cultivated in British and European gardens for over a century.

== Selected trees ==
=== Coniferous trees ===
==== Sequoias and redwoods ====
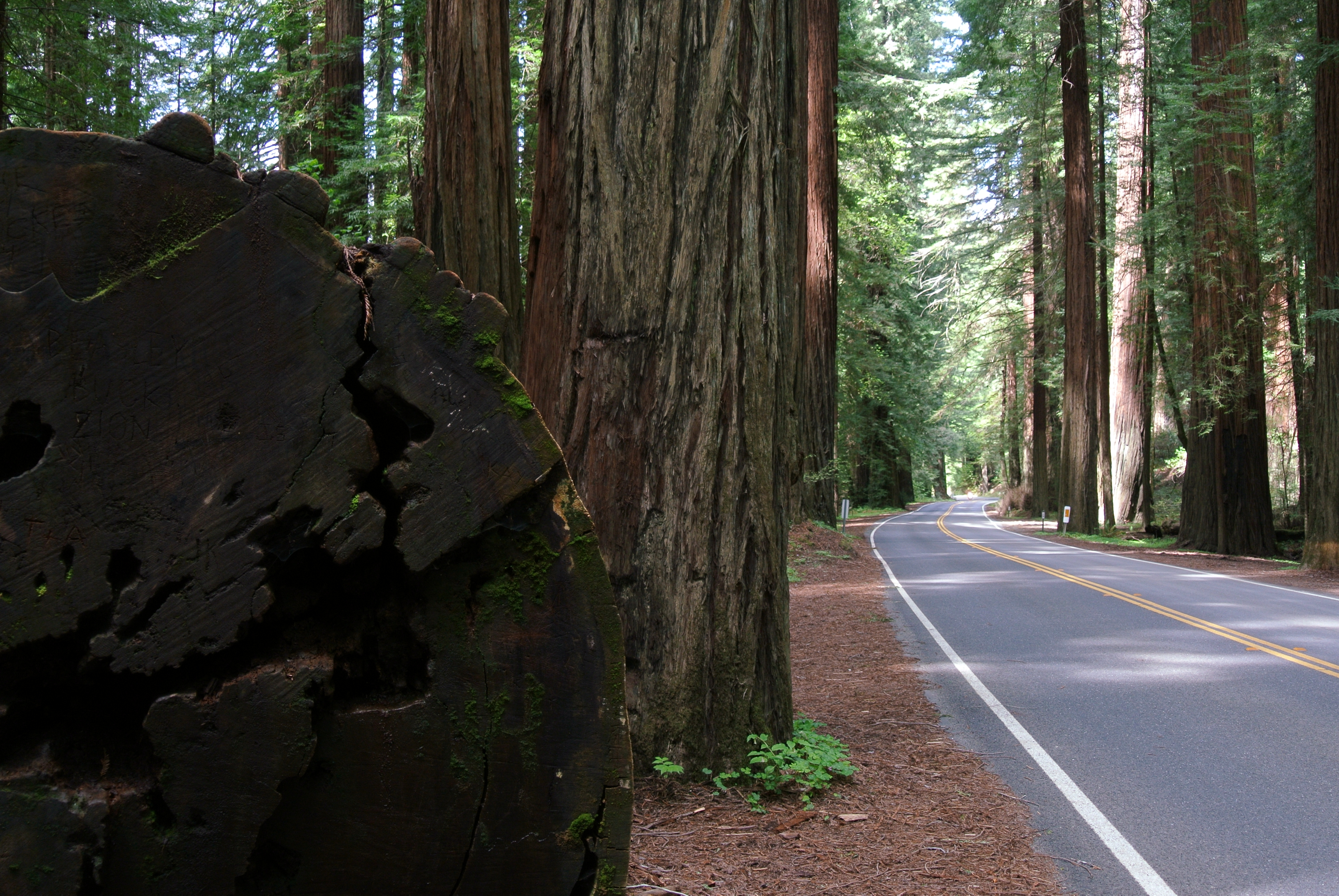
Coast redwood (Sequoia sempervirens)

- Coast redwood (Sequoia sempervirens) - in the fog-shrouded Pacific coast. This and the giant sequoia are the state trees of California.
- Giant sequoia (Sequoiadendron giganteum) - in the Sierra Nevada Mountains.

==== Pine trees ====
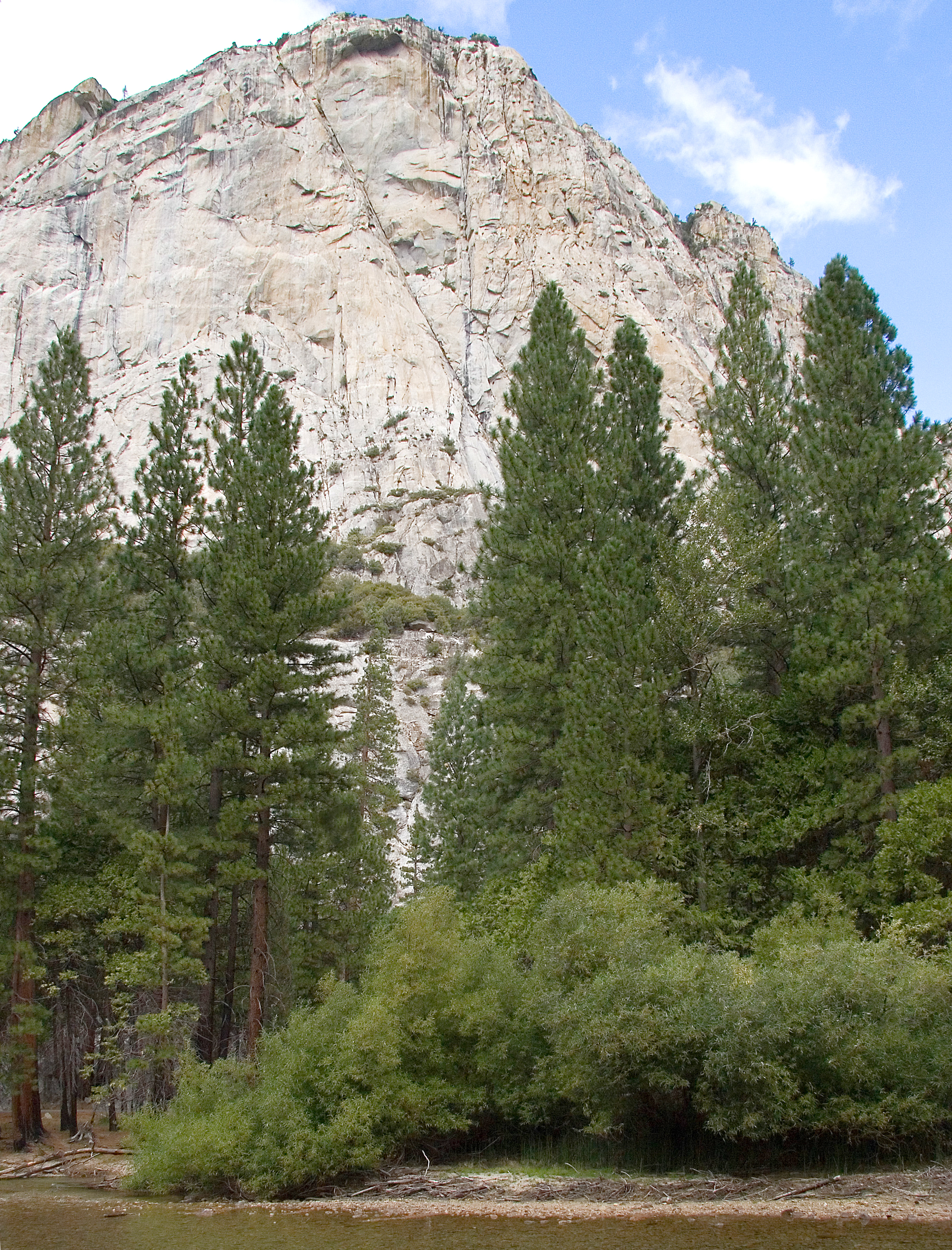
Pinus ponderosa, Kings Canyon National Park

- Bishop pine (Pinus muricata): coastal species grown in gardens
- Coulter pine (Pinus coulteri)
- Gray pine, ghost pine, or digger pine (Pinus sabiniana)
- Knobcone pine (Pinus attenuata)
- Ponderosa pine (Pinus ponderosa): well known in mountains
- Lodgepole pine (Pinus contorta): used for early construction of buildings and other structures.
- Monterey pine (Pinus radiata): naturally limited endemic range; widely planted horticulturally around the world
- Limber pine (Pinus flexilis)
- Jeffrey pine (Pinus jeffreyi)
- Parry pinyon (Pinus quadrifolia)
- Shore pine (Pinus contorta)
- Sugar pine (Pinus lambertiana)
- Torrey pine (Pinus torreyana)
- Western white pine (Pinus monticola)
- Single-leaf pinyon pine (Pinus monophylla)
- Great Basin bristlecone pine (Pinus longaeva): the Methuselah, a 4,700-year-old specimen
- Foxtail pine (Pinus balfouriana): endemic to California; 2,000-year-old specimens

==== Western Cypress ====
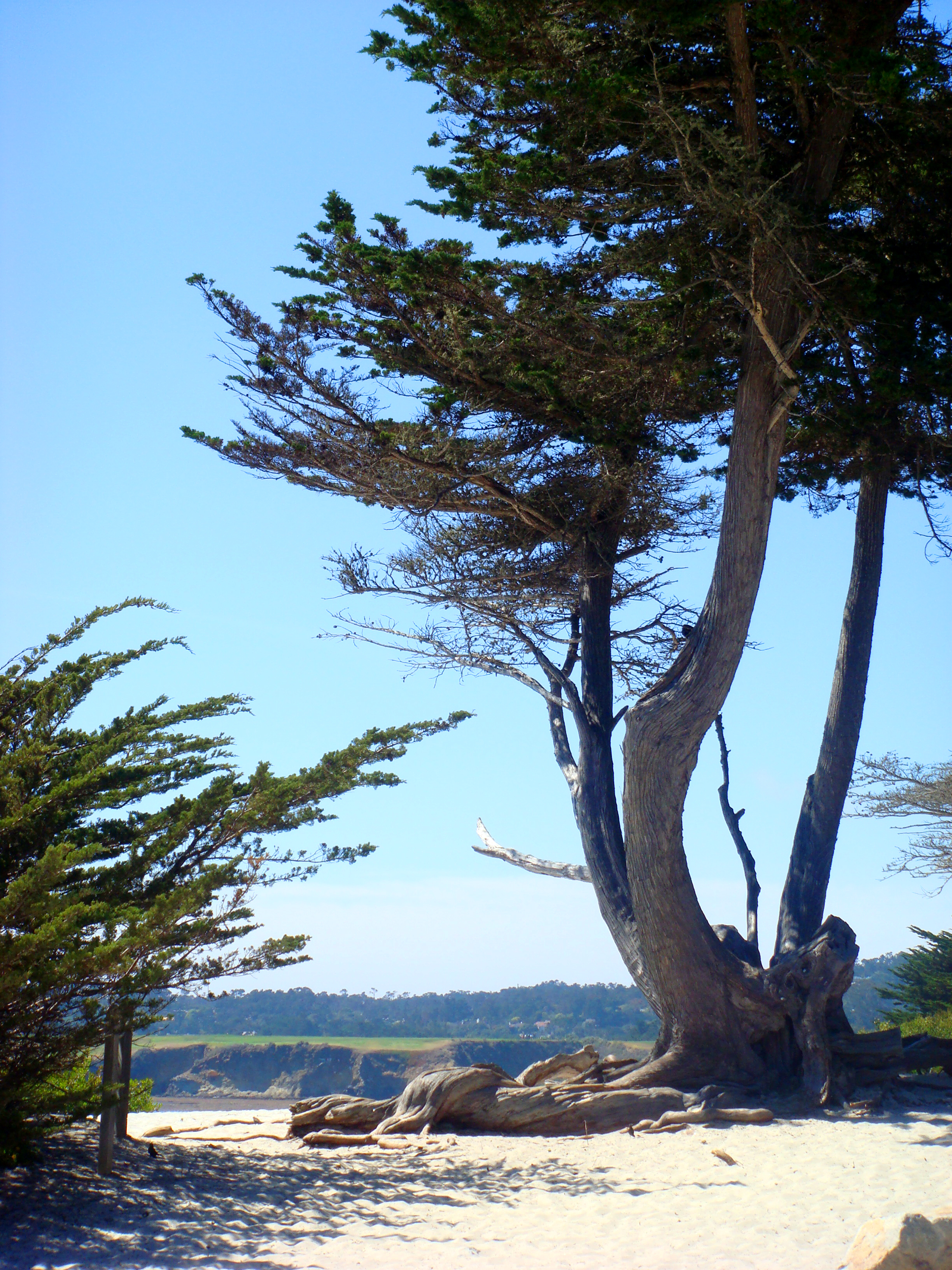
Monterey cypress, Carmel

- Arizona cypress (Hesperocyparis arizonica)
- Baker cypress (Hesperocyparis bakeri)
- Cuyamaca cypress (Hesperocyparis stephensonii)
- Gowen cypress (Hesperocyparis goveniana)
- McNab's cypress (Hesperocyparis macnabiana)
- Monterey cypress (Hesperocyparis macrocarpa)
- Paiute cypress (Hesperocyparis nevadensis)
- Pygmy cypress (Hesperocyparis pygmaea)
- Santa Cruz cypress (Hesperocyparis abramsiana)
- Sargent's cypress (Hesperocyparis sargentii)
- Tecate cypress (Hesperocyparis forbesii)

==== Other conifers ====
- Santa Lucia fir (Abies bracteata) and seven other native Abies species
- Douglas fir (Pseudotsuga menziesii)
- Bigcone Douglas-fir (Pseudotsuga macrocarpa) - Central Coast and Santa Susana Mountains.
- California nutmeg (Torreya californica)
- Incense cedar (Calocedrus decurrens)
- Port Orford cedar/Lawson's cypress (Chamaecyparis lawsoniana)
- White fir (Abies concolor) - at high elevations
- Mountain hemlock (Tsuga mertensiana)
- Red fir (Abies magnifica)
- Pacific yew (Taxus brevifolia)
- Western juniper (Juniperus occidentalis)

=== Oak trees ===
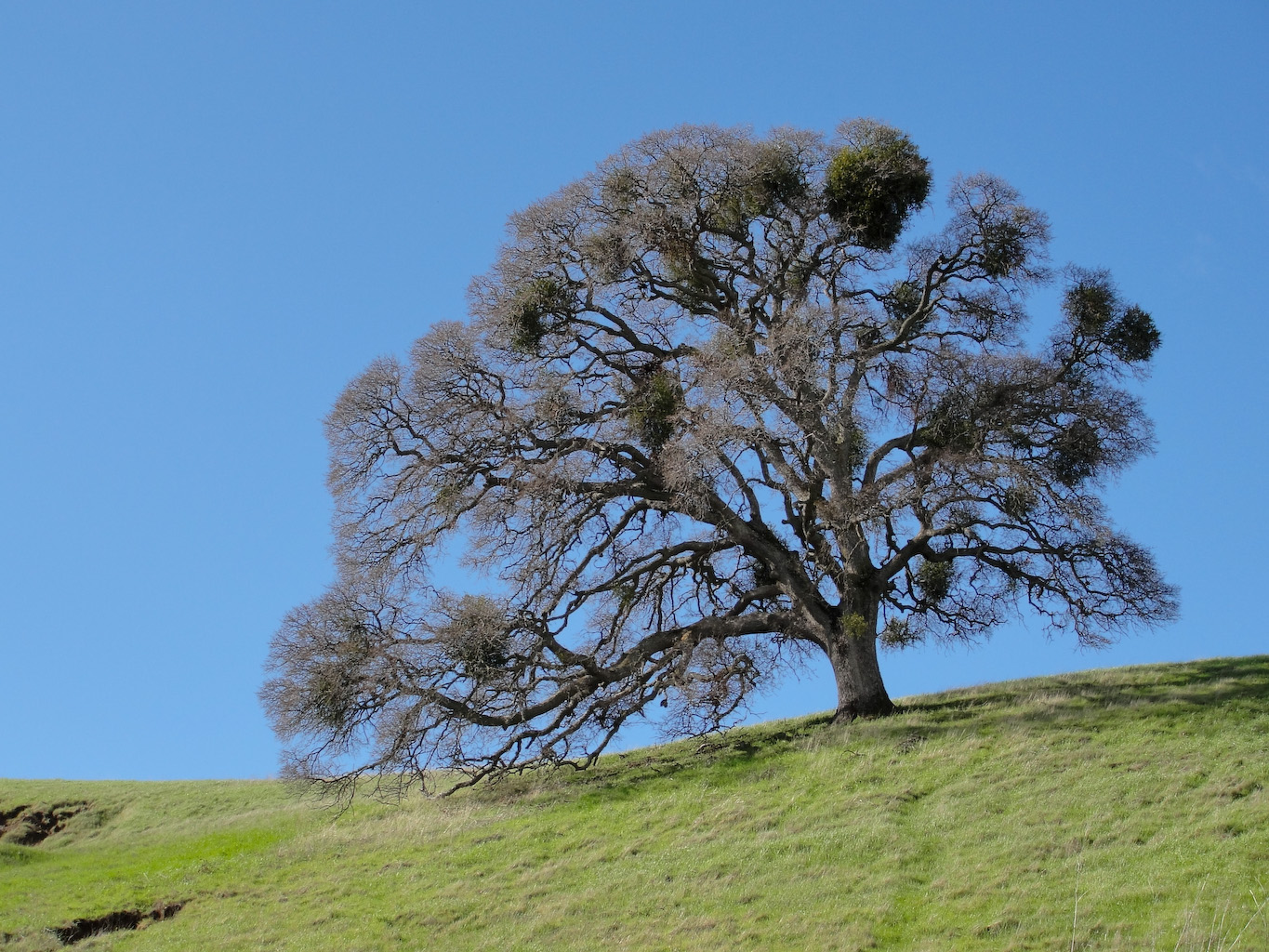
Valley oak near Mount Diablo.

California is home to many deciduous and evergreen oaks, often occurring in oak woodlands:

- Valley oak (Quercus lobata) - the largest of these, found in valley regions.
- Leather oak (Quercus durata) - an evergreen shrub endemic to serpentine chaparral.
- Blue oak (Quercus douglasii) - in the Central Valley foothills and Coast Ranges.
- California black oak (Quercus kelloggii) - in the higher hills and mountains.
- Canyon live oak (Quercus chrysolepis) - found mainly in northern mountainous regions.
- Interior live oak (Quercus wislizeni) - found in the Central Valley region.
- Coastal Scrub oak (Quercus dumosa) - Southern california.
- California scrub oak (Quercus berberidifolia) - Coastal scrub
- Engelmann oak (Quercus engelmanni) - an endangered species with a cool blue-gray cast to the foliage.
- Coast live oak (Quercus agrifolia) - found in the Coast Ranges, Transverse Ranges, Peninsular Ranges, and along the coast's hills and adjacent interior valleys, as well as many other habitats and gardens.
- Palmer oak (Quercus palmeri) -San Francisco Bay and south
- Island oak (Quercus tomentella) - endemic to the Channel Islands with distinctive large evergreen leaves.
- Island scrub oak (Quercus pacifica) - endemic to the Channel Islands

=== Riparian trees ===
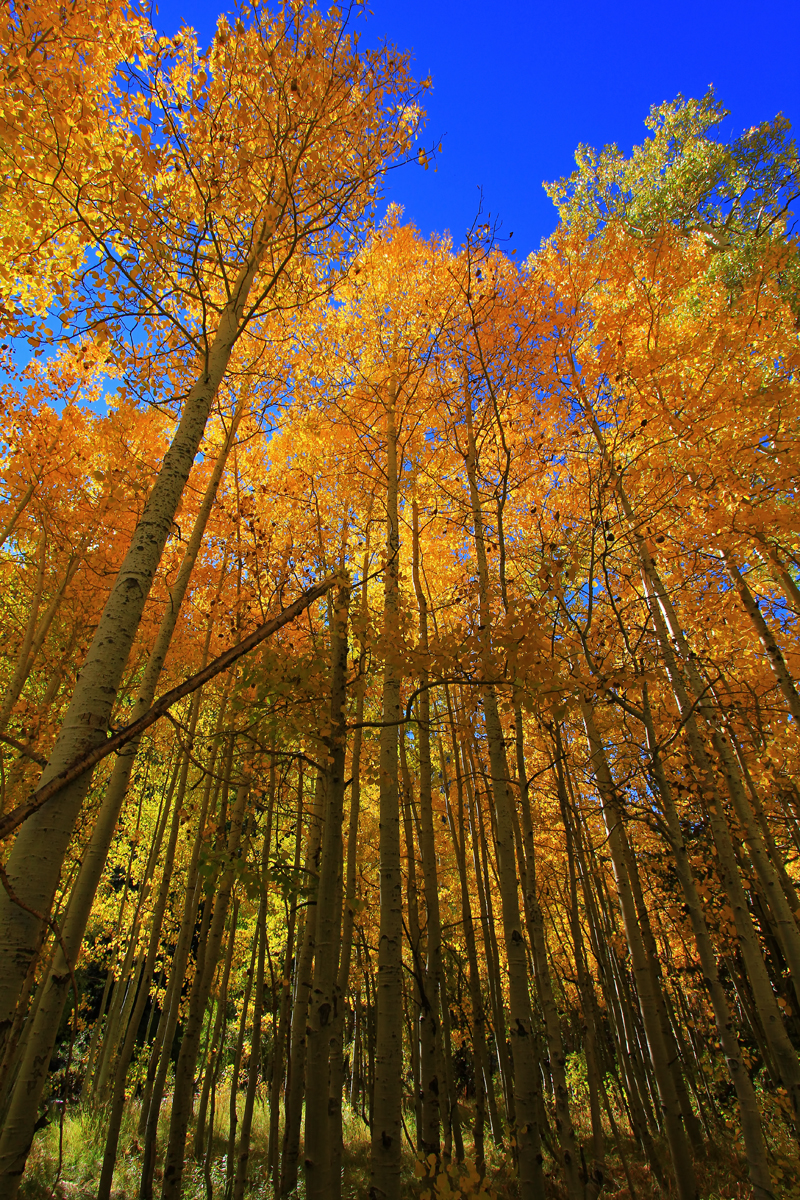
Quaking aspen (Populus tremuloides) in Lee Vining Canyon

In riparian areas (streamside and moist habitats) some of the trees include:

- California sycamore (Platanus racemosa)
- White alder (Alnus rhombifolia)
- Quaking aspen (Populus tremuloides)
- Fremont cottonwood (Populus fremontii)
- Black cottonwood (Populus trichocarpa)
- Arroyo willow (Salix lasiolepis)

=== Other trees and tree-like shrubs ===
- Tanoak (Notholithocarpus densiflorus)
- California bay laurel (Umbellularia californica)
- Pacific madrone (Arbutus menziesii)
- Toyon (Heteromeles arbutifolia)
- Bigleaf maple (Acer macrophyllum)
- Blue elderberry (Sambucus cerulea) is found throughout the state, an important host for birds, butterflies, pollinators, and beneficial insects (integrated pest management)
- California buckeye (Aesculus californica)
- Western redbud (Cercis occidentalis)
- California black walnut (Juglans californica)
- California hazelnut (Corylus cornuta)

== Selected shrubs ==
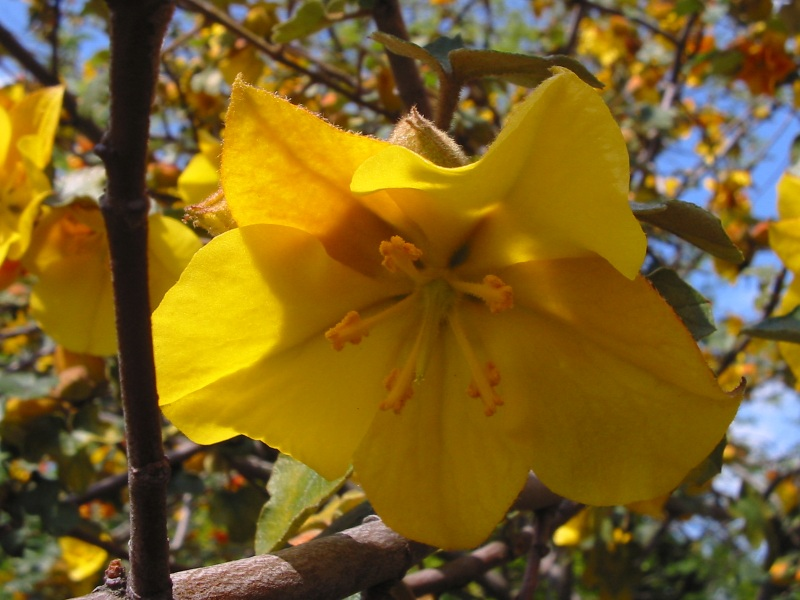
Fremontodendron californicum (California flannelbush)

- Chamise (Adenostoma fasciculatum)
- Serviceberry (Amelanchier alnifolia)
- Manzanita (Arctostaphylos spp.)
- California sagebrush (Artemisia californica)
- Coyote brush (Baccharis pilularis)
- Calliandra (Calliandra spp.)
- California lilac (Ceanothus spp.)
- Desert willow (Chilopsis linearis)
- Flannelbush (Fremontodendron spp.)
- Hollyleaf cherry (Prunus ilicifolia)
- Spicebush (Calycanthus occidentalis)
- Bush anemone (Carpenteria californica)
- Bladderpod (Peritoma arborea)
- Creosote bush (Larrea tridentata)
- Lupines (Lupinus spp.)
- Snowberry (Symphoricarpos mollis & spp.)
- Huckleberry (Vaccinium ovatum & spp.)
- California coffeeberry (Frangula californica)
- Lemonade berry (Rhus integrifolia)
- Sugarbush (Rhus ovata)
- Gooseberries and currants (Ribes spp.)
- Sages (Salvia spp.)

== Selected desert plants ==
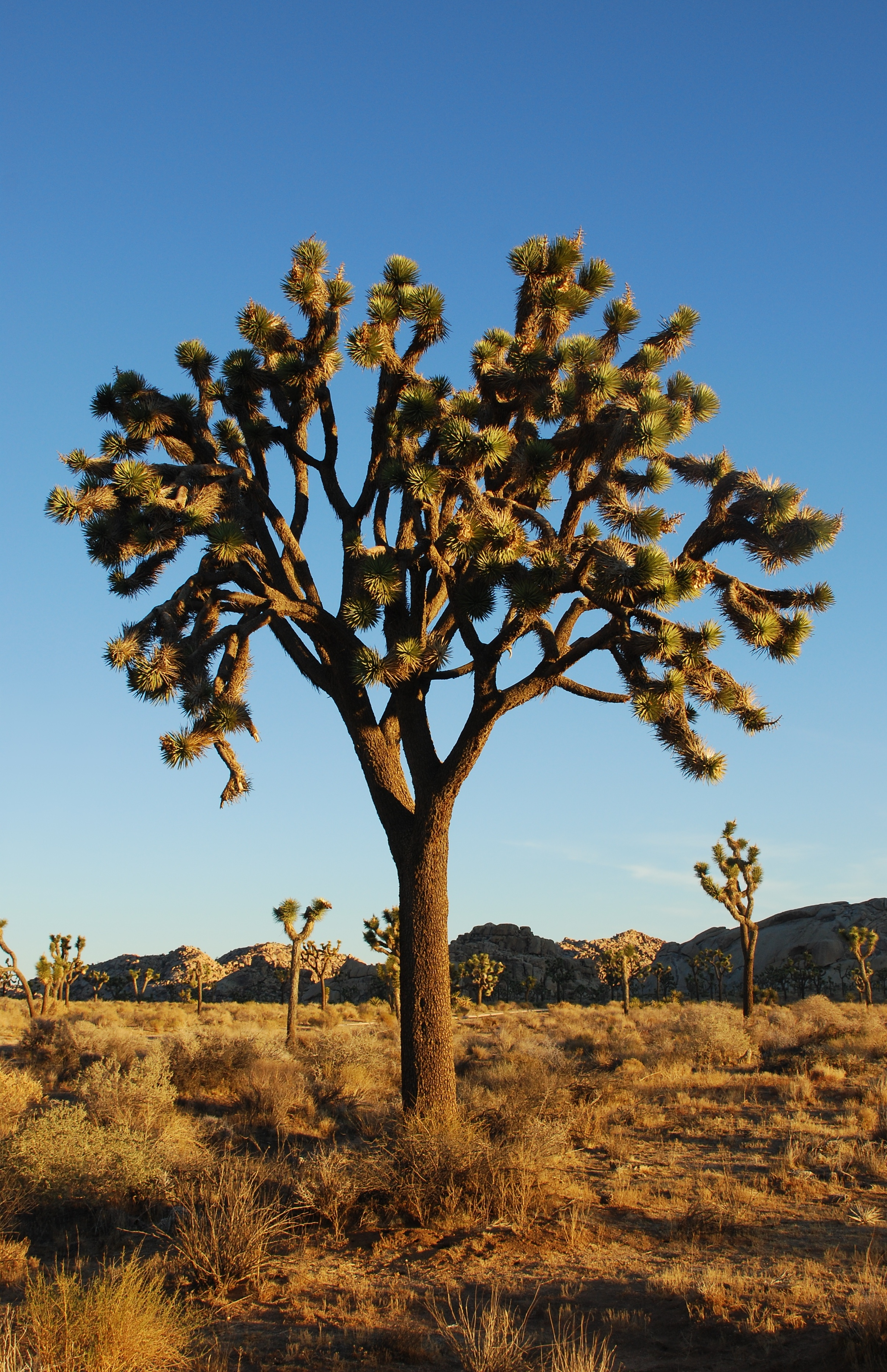
A Joshua tree in Joshua Tree National Park

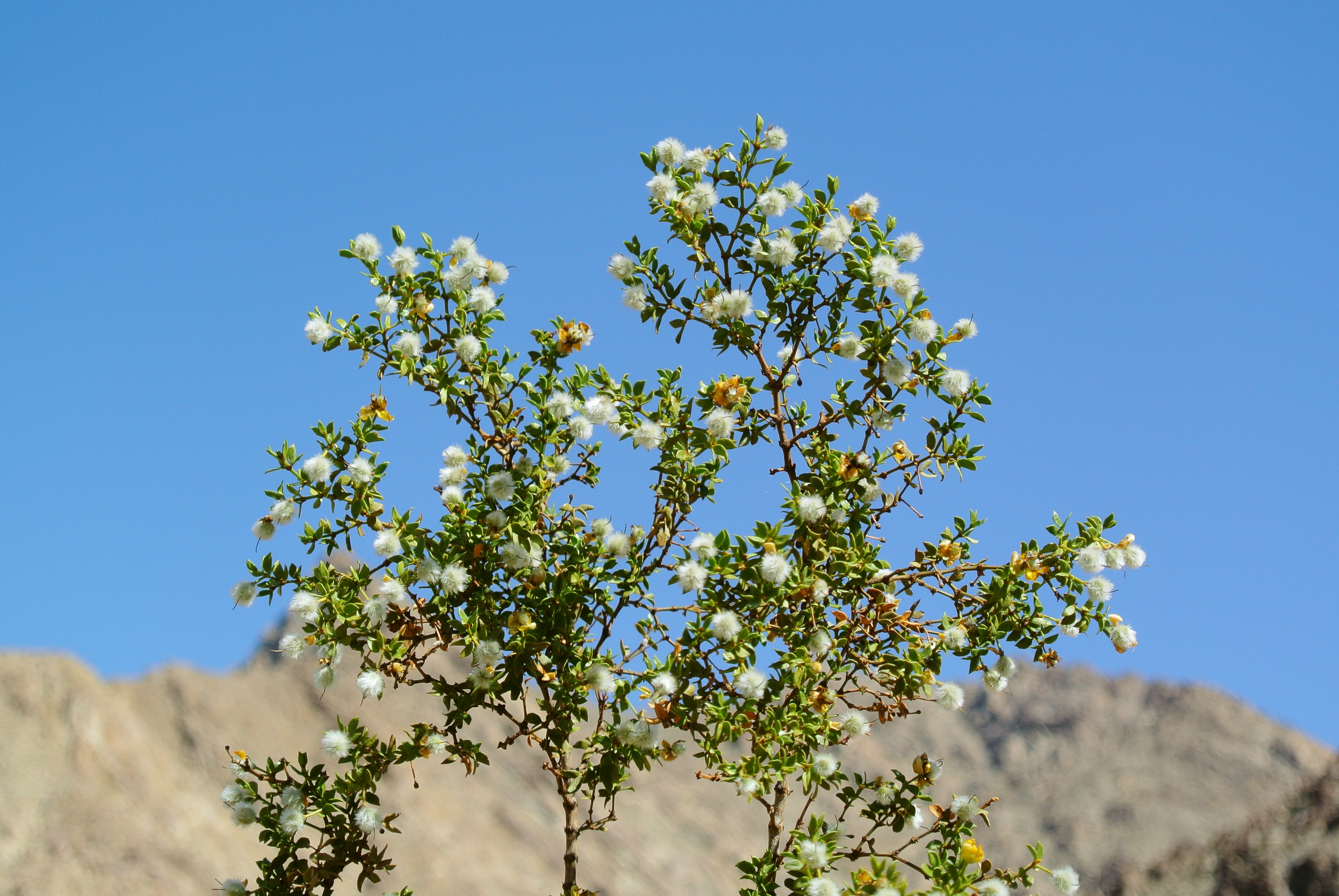
Creosote bush (Larrea tridentata)

- California fan palm (Washingtonia filifera)
- Joshua tree (Yucca brevifolia)
- Jojoba (Simmondsia chinensis)
- California juniper (Juniperus californica)
- Blue palo verde (Parkinsonia florida)
- Yellow foothill palo verde (Parkinsonia microphylla)
- Single-leaf pinyon (Pinus monophylla)
- Fremont cottonwood (Populus fremontii)
- Ocotillo (Fouquieria splendens)
- Creosote bush (Larrea tridentata)
- Indian mallow (Abutilon palmeri)
- Brittlebush (Encelia farinosa)
- Desert agave (Agave deserti)
- California barrel cactus (Ferocactus cylindraceus)
- Banana yucca (Yucca baccata)
- Mojave yucca (Yucca schidigera)
- Rush milkweed (Asclepias subulata)
- Purple desert sand-verbena (Abronia villosa)
- Sacred datura (Datura wrightii)

== Selected perennials ==
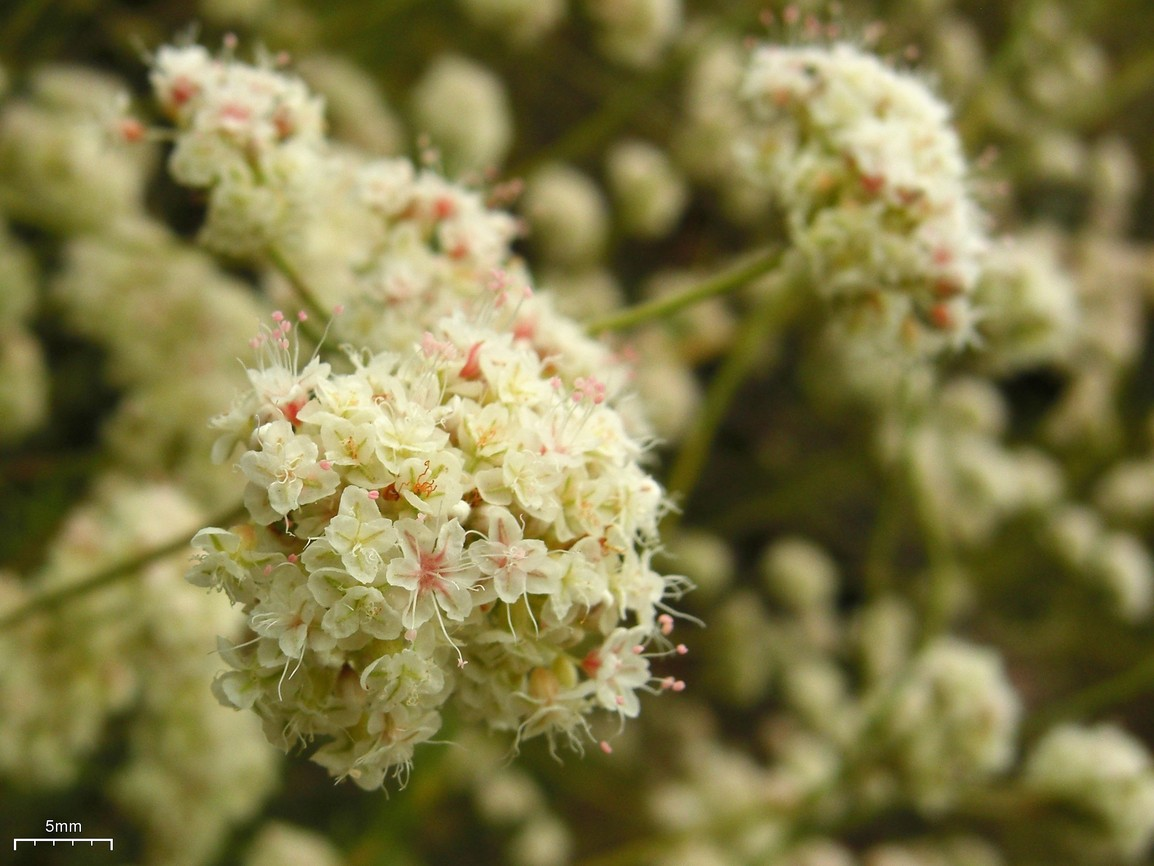
Eriogonum fasciculatum (California buckwheat)

=== Sunny habitats ===
- California poppy (Eschscholzia californica) are found in drier places. California poppies are also an annual in many places. The state flower of California.
- Douglas iris (Iris douglasiana) and 'Pacific Coast' hybrids
- Monkeyflowers (Diplacus, Erythranthe), e.g.: Diplacus aurantiacus, Erythranthe guttata, Erythranthe cardinalis and cultivars.
- Columbine (Aquilegia spp.)
- Coyote mint (Monardella spp.)
- Buckwheats (Eriogonum), e.g.: Eriogonum fasciculatum, Eriogonum giganteum, Eriogonum umbellatum

=== Shady habitats ===
- Western wild ginger (Asarum caudatum)
- Pacific bleeding heart (Dicentra formosa)
- Island coral bells (Heuchera maxima)
- Canyon coral bells (Heuchera hirsutissima)
- Threeleaf foamflower (Tiarella trifoliata)
- Redwood sorrel (Oxalis oregana)

=== Ferns ===
- Polypody ferns (Polypodium), e.g.: Polypodium californicum
- Sword ferns (Polystichum), e.g.: Polystichum munitum
- Giant chain fern (Woodwardia fimbriata)
- Goldback ferns (Pentagramma spp.)
- Wood ferns (Dryopteris spp.), e.g.: Dryopteris arguta
- Maidenhair ferns (Adiantum spp.) e.g.: Adiantum jordanii

== Selected bulbs ==
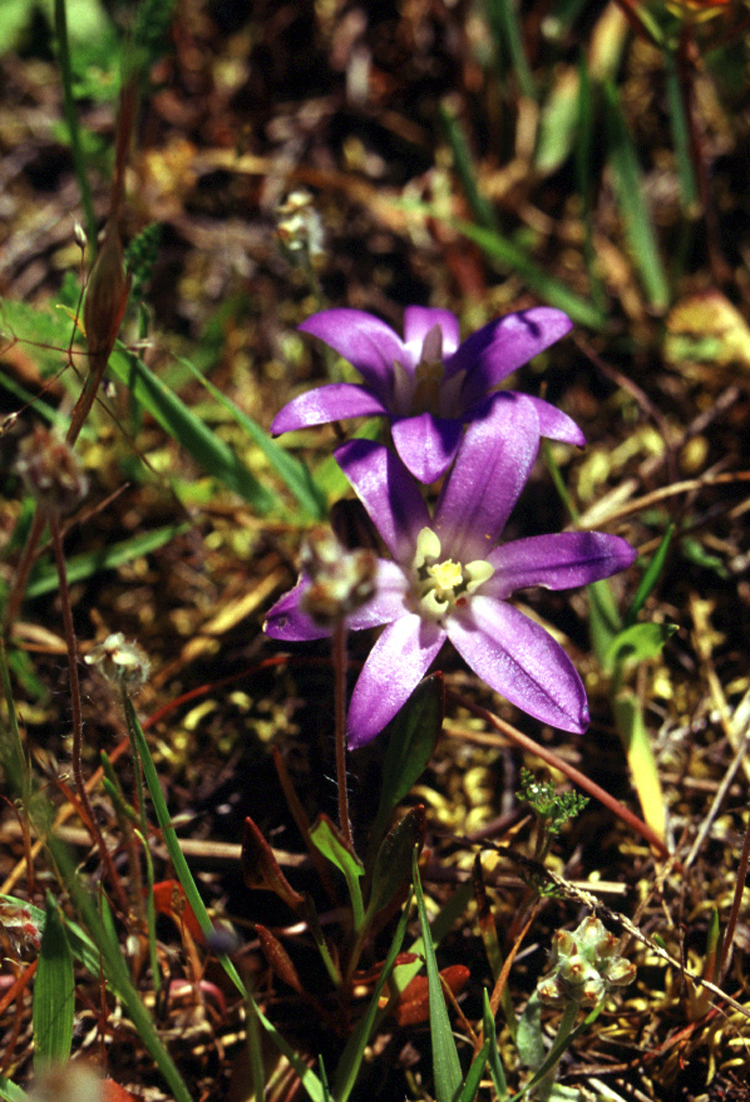
Brodiaea coronaria (California hyacinth)

- Ithuriel's spear (Triteleia spp.)
- Meadow onion (Allium monticola)
- Goldenstar (Bloomeria crocea)
- Brodiaea (Brodiaea spp.)
- Blue dicks (Dipterostemon capitatus): one of the most common native bulb species throughout California; found in grassland and dry meadow habitats
- Mariposa lily (Calochortus spp.): available from reputable horticultural sources; taking from the wild is illegal and is resulting in significant declines of some species from over collecting.

== Selected annuals and wildflowers ==
- Arroyo lupine (Lupinus succulentus)
- Baby blue eyes (Nemophila menziesii)
- Bird’s eye gilia (Gilia tricolor)
- Blazing star (Mentzelia lindleyi)
- California bluebell (Phacelia campanularia)
- California goldfields (Lasthenia californica)
- California larksppur (Delphinium californicum)
- California poppy (Eschscholzia californica)
- California sunflower (Helianthus californicus)
- California tree poppy (Romneya coulteri)
- Chaparral clarkia (Clarkia affinis)
- Chinese houses (Collinsia heterophylla)
- Elegant clarkia (Clarkia unguiculata)
- Farewell to spring (Clarkia amoena)
- Meadowfoam (Limnanthes douglasii)
- Miner's lettuce (Claytonia perfoliata)
- Northwestern yellowflax (Sclerolinon digynum)
- Serpentine linanthus (Leptosiphon ambiguus)
- Sky lupine (Lupinus nanus)
- South Fork Mountain lupine (Lupinus elmeri)
- Tarweed (Madia elegans)
- Two-fork clover (Trifolium amoenum)
- Wind poppy (Papaver heterophyllum)
- Valley popcornflower (Plagiobothrys canescens)
- Violet draperia (Draperia)

== Selected vines ==
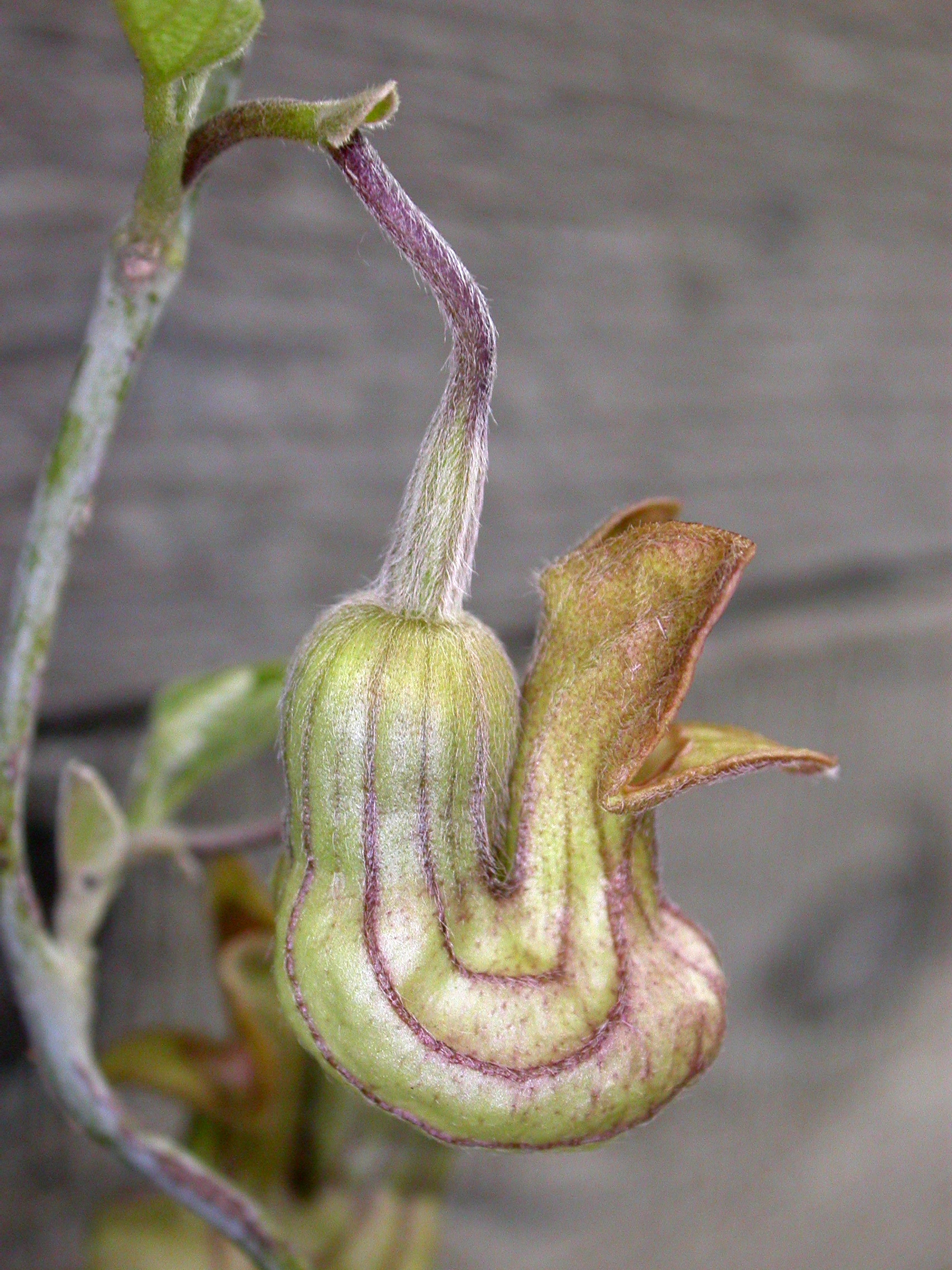
Aristolochia californica (Dutchman's pipe)

- California pipevine (Aristolochia spp.)
- Morning glory (Calystegia spp.)
- Pipestem clematis (Clematis lasiantha)
- Western virgin's bower (Clematis ligusticifolia)
- Buffalo gourd (Cucurbita foetidissima)
- California manroot (Marah fabacea)
- Chilicothe (Marah macrocarpa)
- California wild grape (Vitis californica)
- Desert wild grape (Vitis girdiana)

== Selected grasses ==
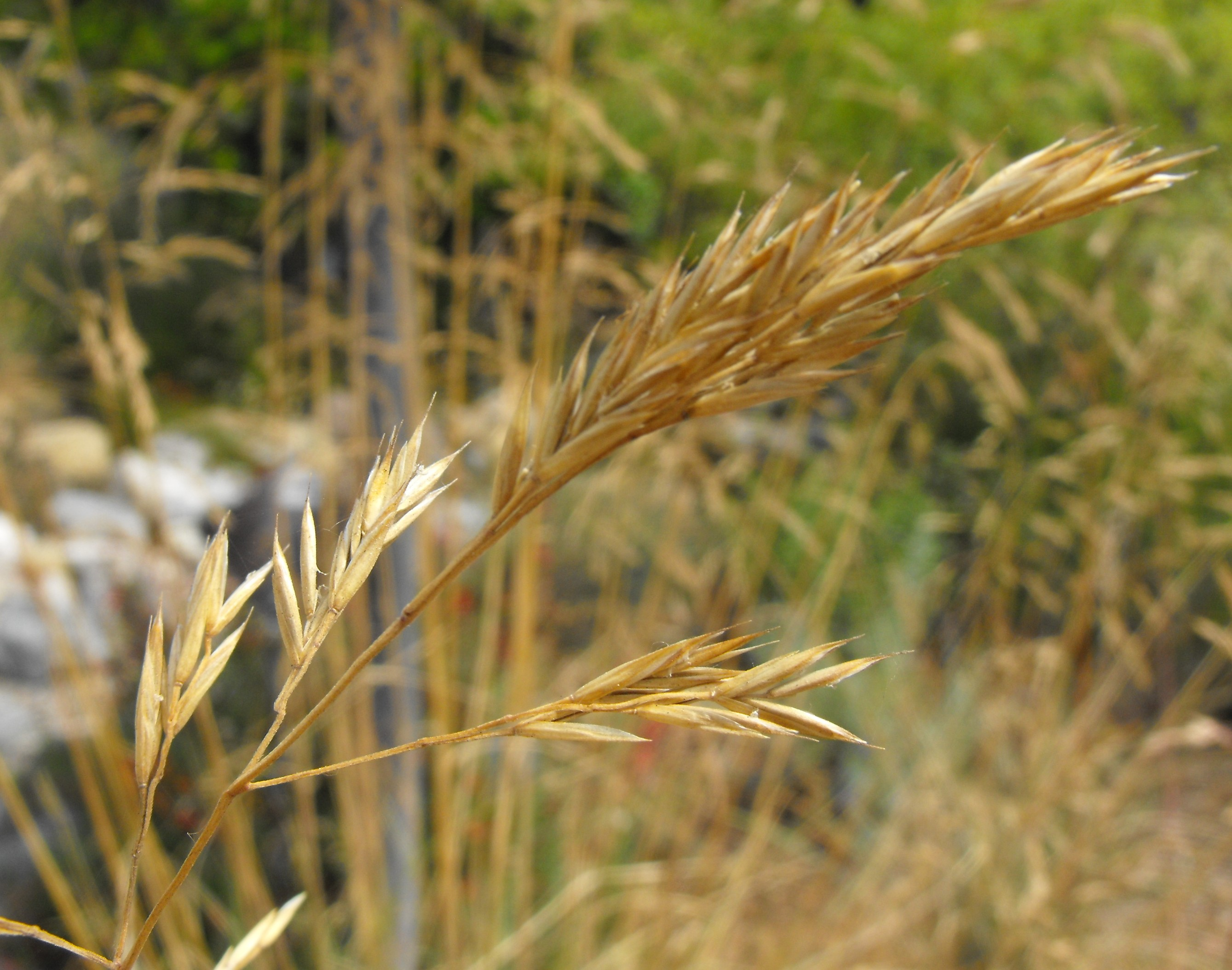
Festuca californica, El Cajon

Grasses:

- Purple three-awn (Aristida purpurea)
- Blue grama (Bouteloua gracilis)
- California fescue (Festuca californica)
- Idaho fescue (Festuca idahoensis)
- Red fescue (Festuca rubra)
- Junegrass (Koeleria macrantha)
- Giant wildrye (Leymus condensatus)
- California melic (Melica californica)
- Deer grass (Muhlenbergia rigens)
- Purple needlegrass (Nassella pulchra): The state grass of California
- Indian ricegrass (Oryzopsis hymenoides)
- Pine bluegrass (Poa secunda)

Grasslike:

- Sedges — (Carex spp.) (taller 'bunch grass' specimens and lower meadow spreaders)
- Rushes — (Juncus spp.)
- Western blue-eyed grass (Sisyrinchium bellum) and yellow-eyed-grass (Sisyrinchium californicum).

== Selected succulents ==
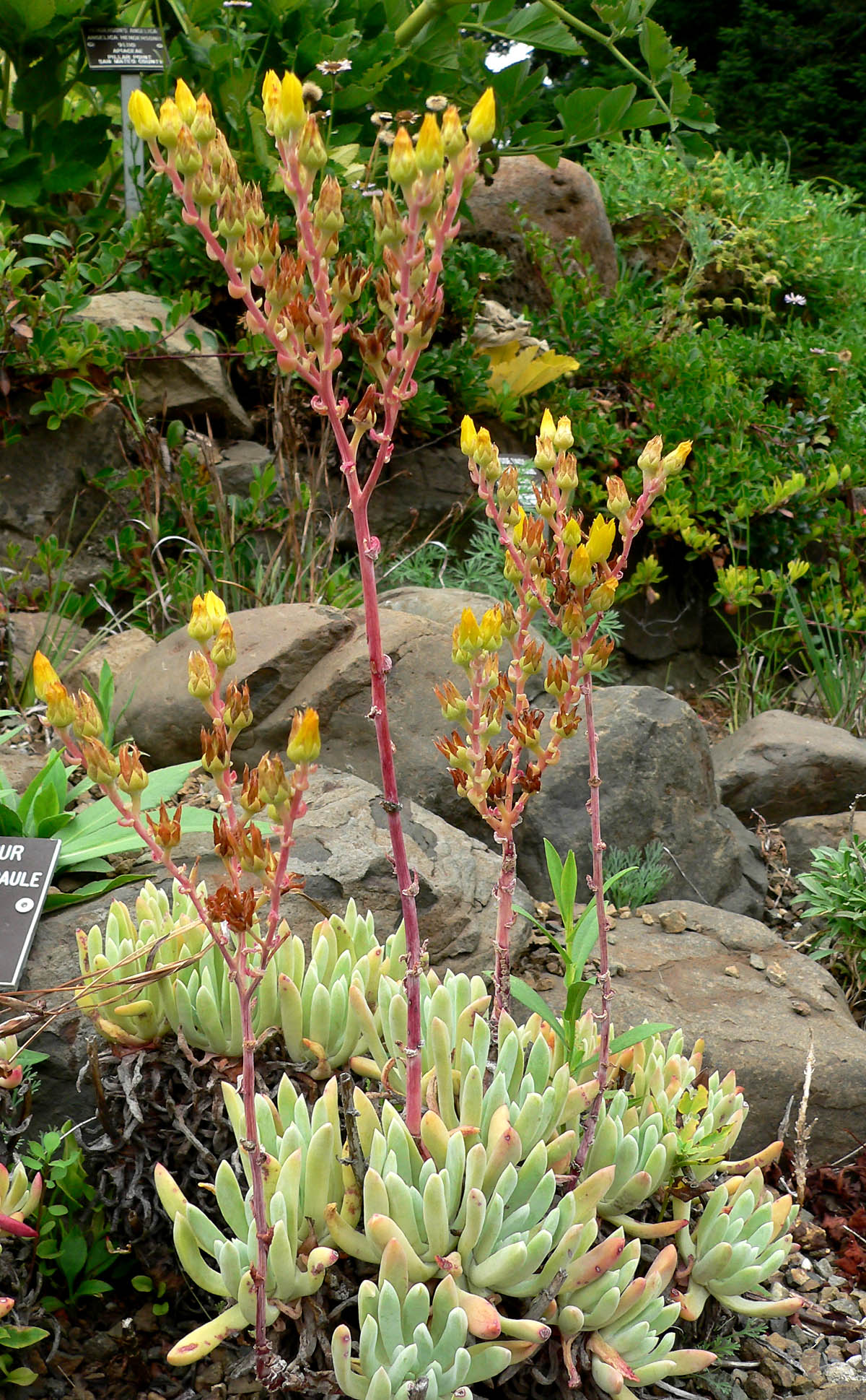
Coast dudleya (Dudleya caespitosa)

Dudleyas

- Chalk lettuce (Dudleya pulverulenta) - garden-plant
- Coast dudleya (Dudleya caespitosa) - [CA endemic]
- Canyon liveforever (Dudleya cymosa) - garden-plant
- Fingertips (Dudleya edulis) - garden-plant
- Giant chalk dudleya, Britton's dudleya (Dudleya brittonii) - garden-plant
- Lanceleaf liveforever (Dudleya lanceolata) - garden-plant

Sedums

- Broadleaf stonecrop (Sedum spathulifolium) - San Bruno elfin butterfly host plant.
- Oregon stonecrop (Sedum oreganum)
- Feather River stonecrop (Sedum albomarginatum) - [CA endemic, Sierras]
- Red Mountain stonecrop (Sedum eastwoodiae) - [CA endemic, Mendocino]
- Roseflower stonecrop (Sedum laxum)
- Sierra stonecrop (Sedum obtusatum)

== Environmental challenges ==
Some California native plants are in rapid decline in their native habitat due to urban sprawl, agriculture, overgrazing, recreational impacts, pollution, and invasive non-native species (invasive exotics) colonization pressures (animals and other kingdoms of life, as well as plants).

California also has 1,023 species of non-native plants, some now problematic invasive species, such as yellow star-thistle, that were introduced during the Spanish colonization, the California Gold Rush, and subsequent immigrations and import trading of the 18th, 19th and 20th centuries.

== See also ==
- California Native Plant Society
- Theodore Payne Foundation
