= Theodore Payne =

American environmentalist, horticulturist, garden designer

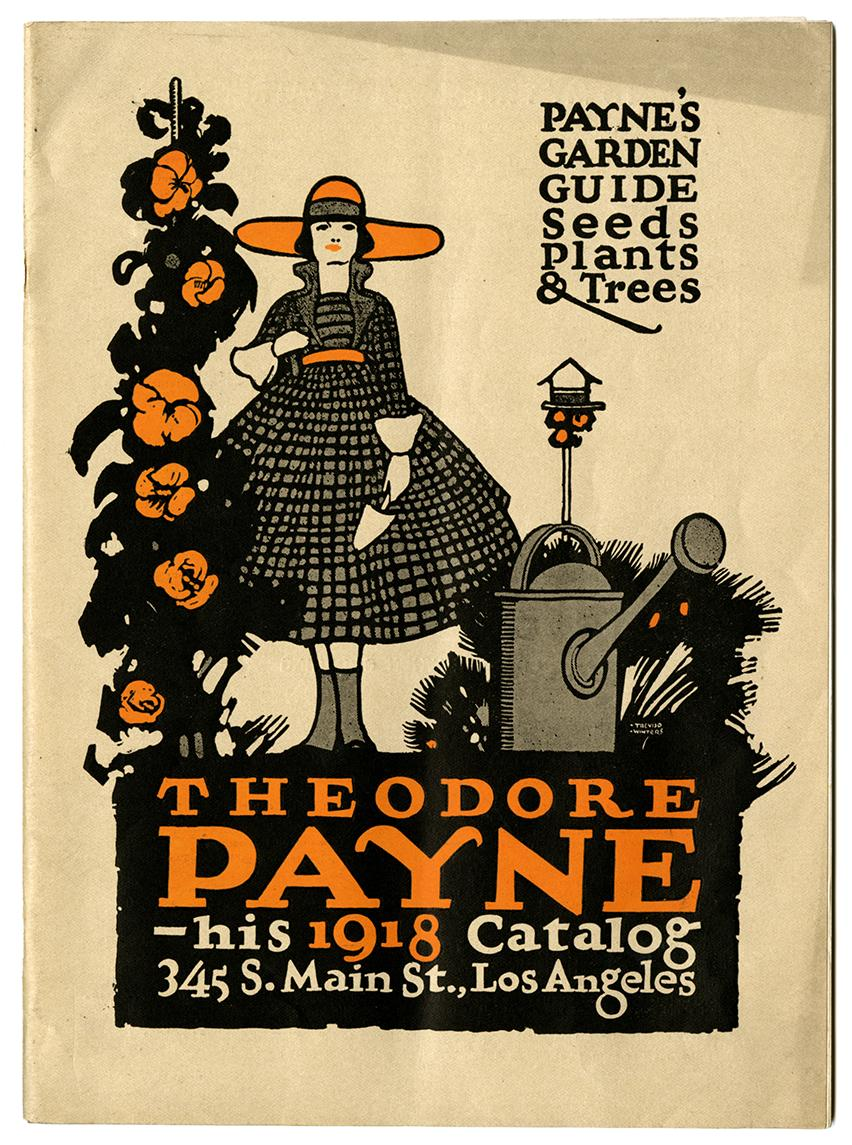

Theodore Payne (June 19, 1872 - May 6, 1963), was an English horticulturist, gardener, landscape designer, and botanist. His best known work was done over his adult life in Southern California.

== Biography ==
Payne was born at Manor Farm, Church Brampton, Northamptonshire, England on June 19, 1872. Payne was orphaned and sent to Ackworth School and then served an apprenticeship in horticulture. He first saw California native plants in London, at The Royal Botanical Gardens at Kew in 1891. Payne was apprenticed for three years to J. Cheal and Sons, a nursery firm in Crawley, Sussex.

=== California ===
In June 1893, Payne completed his contract and traveled to the United States. He arrived in New York, traveled to Chicago where he visited the World's Columbian Exhibition, then set out for Southern California. Upon arriving in 1893, he worked for a week picking apricots, then in July found a job as head gardener for Madame Helena Modjeska at "Arden," her ranch estate in Santiago Canyon of eastern Orange County. In his memoir, Life on the Modjeska Ranch in the Gay Nineties, he offers perhaps the best account of daily life on the Modjeska Ranch. It was there that he began his lifelong interest in California native plants, exploring the extensive natural areas surrounding the Ranch.

In 1898, Payne left the employment of Madame Modjeska for a position with the Germain Seed Company. He remained with this firm for five years, becoming head of the seed department. He started his own business in 1903 when he purchased the Evans Nursery in Downtown Los Angeles. California native wildflower seeds and bulbs and native plants were the specialty of his plant nursery business. His nursery location moved several times before settling permanently on Los Feliz Boulevard in Atwater Village in 1923, a few miles north of downtown Los Angeles. The main nursery building was designed by architect Myron Hunt.

Even in the early years of the 20th century, native habitats were being lost to agriculture and housing at an alarming rate in California. He urged the use of California native plants and lectured across the state on preserving the wild flowers and landscapes native to California. In 1907, Payne married Alice Noyes in San Francisco, a marriage of 56 years.

In 1915, he laid out and planted 262 species in a 5-acre (20,000 m^{2}) wild garden in Exposition Park, in central Los Angeles. In 1926, he helped to establish the Blaksley Botanic Garden (Santa Barbara Botanic Garden) in Santa Barbara. In 1939, he created native plant garden with 178 plant species at the California Institute of Technology in Pasadena.

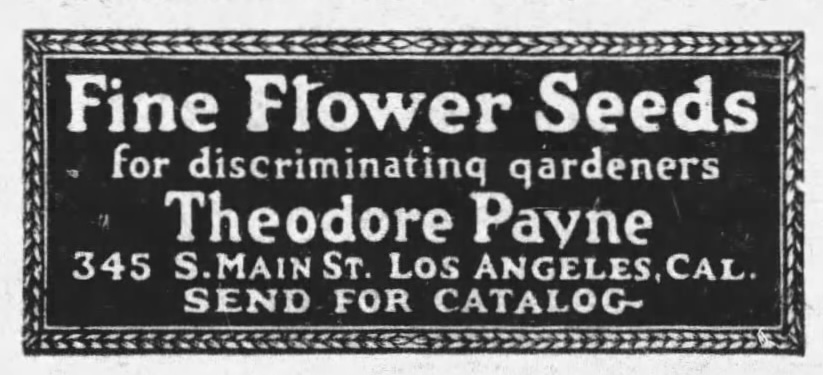
Newspaper advertisement

He assisted Susan Bixby Bryant in 1927 with the siting and design of the original Rancho Santa Ana Botanic Garden in Orange County, and helped relocate the Garden to Claremont in 1951. In 1958, he helped create the native plant garden at Descanso Gardens in La Cañada.

By the time he retired in 1958, Payne had introduced over 430 species of native plants to the public through his nursery. Theodore Payne died on May 6, 1963.

=== Organizations ===
He was a founding member of the California Association of Nurserymen—CAN, the Wild Flower Club, the Nature Club, and other horticultural organizations. He was a member of the Southern California Academy of Sciences, including serving as president of the organization. He was a member of many other local horticultural, scientific, and social organizations.

The Theodore Payne Foundation for Wild Flowers and Native Plants was founded and incorporated in 1960 upon Payne's retirement to carry on his life's work. The Foundation is located in Sun Valley, California, a community in the City of Los Angeles.

The Foundation promotes the understanding and preservation of California native flora by propagating plants for use by the general public, through educational programs related to the horticulture and botany of the flora, with the display of botanical art depicting the flora, among other programs. The Foundation hold Payne's business and personal papers, an archive that provides insight to the horticultural history of California.

"Be a good Californian; be loyal to your own state and keep your landscape Californian, by planting trees from California." — Theodore Payne

== See also ==
- List of California native plants
- Flora of California
- Theodore Payne Foundation
