= F. californica =

F. californica may refer to:

- Festuca californica, the California fescue, a grass species native to California and Oregon
- Fremontia californica, a synonym for Fremontodendron californicum, the California flannelbush, a flowering evergreen shrub species

== See also ==
- List of Latin and Greek words commonly used in systematic names#C
