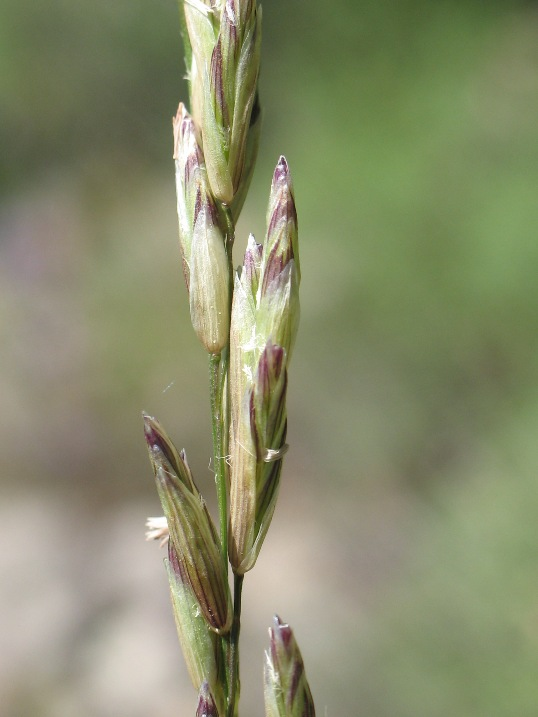

Scientific classification
- Kingdom: Plantae
- Clade: Tracheophytes
- Clade: Angiosperms
- Clade: Monocots
- Clade: Commelinids
- Order: Poales
- Family: Poaceae
- Subfamily: Pooideae
- Genus: Melica
- Species: M. californica

Binomial name
- Melica californica Scribn.

= Melica californica =

Species of flowering plant

Melica californica is a species of grass known by the common name California melic.

== Distribution ==
This grass is native to Oregon and California, where it grows in many types of habitat, from mountain forests to open grassland at sea level.

== Description ==
Melica californica is a perennial bunch grass, generally with rhizomes, producing a dense cluster of stems up to about 1.3 metres (4 ft 3 in) in maximum height. The inflorescence is a narrow series of purple-banded green spikelets.

== Cultivation ==
Melica californica is cultivated in the specialty horticulture trade and available as an ornamental grass for: natural landscape, native plant, drought tolerant water conserving, and habitat gardens

== See also ==
- California native plants
