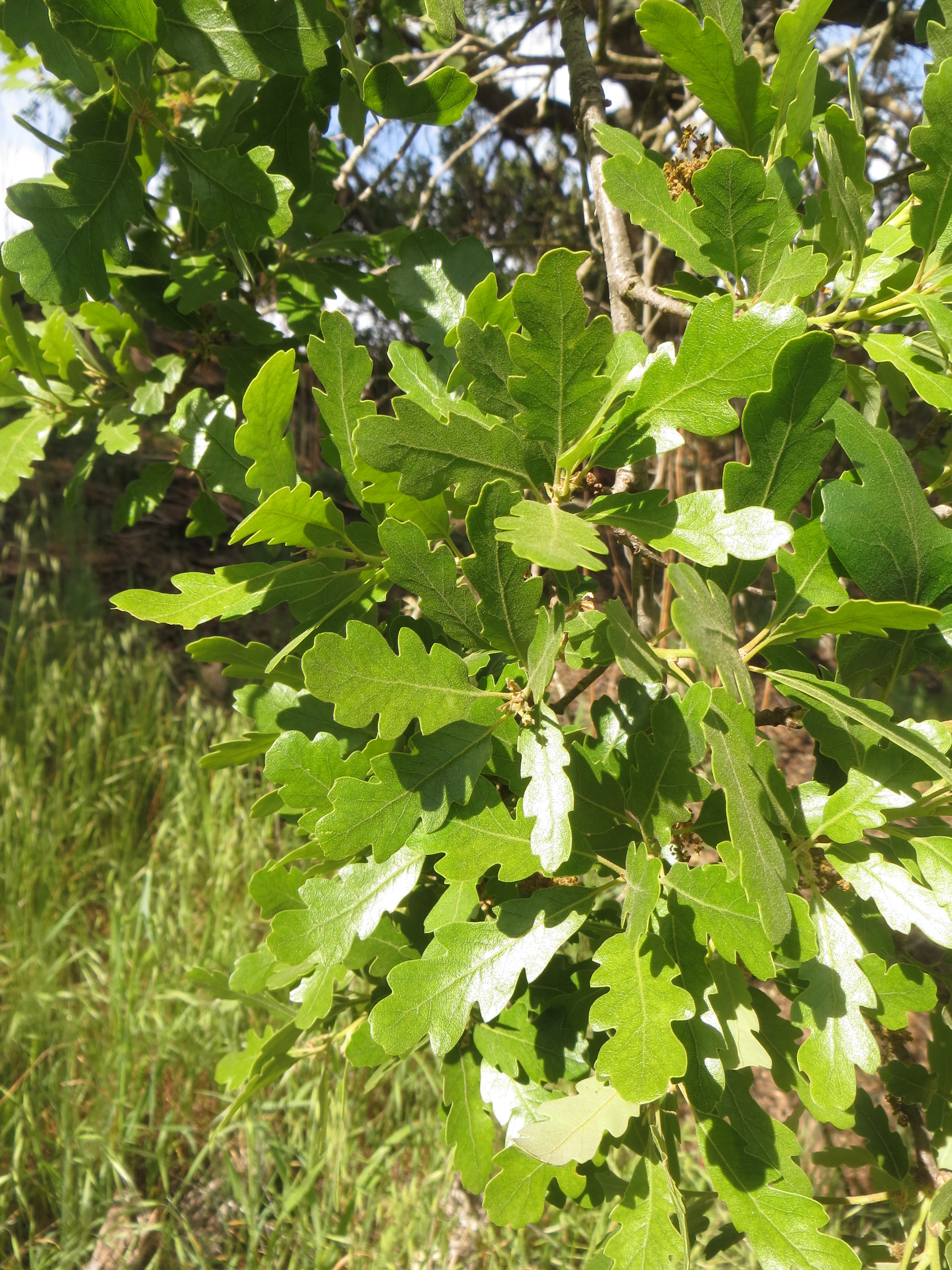
- Leaves from an individual on Santa Cruz Island, California

Scientific classification
- Kingdom: Plantae
- Clade: Tracheophytes
- Clade: Angiosperms
- Clade: Eudicots
- Clade: Rosids
- Order: Fagales
- Family: Fagaceae
- Genus: Quercus
- Subgenus: Quercus subg. Quercus
- Section: Quercus sect. Quercus
- Species: Q. × macdonaldii

Binomial name
- Quercus × macdonaldii Greene & Kellogg (pro sp.)

Synonyms
- Quercus dumosa var. macdonaldii (Greene & Kellogg) Jeps.; Quercus dumosa subsp. macdonaldii (Greene & Kellogg) A.Camus

= Quercus × macdonaldii =

Species of tree

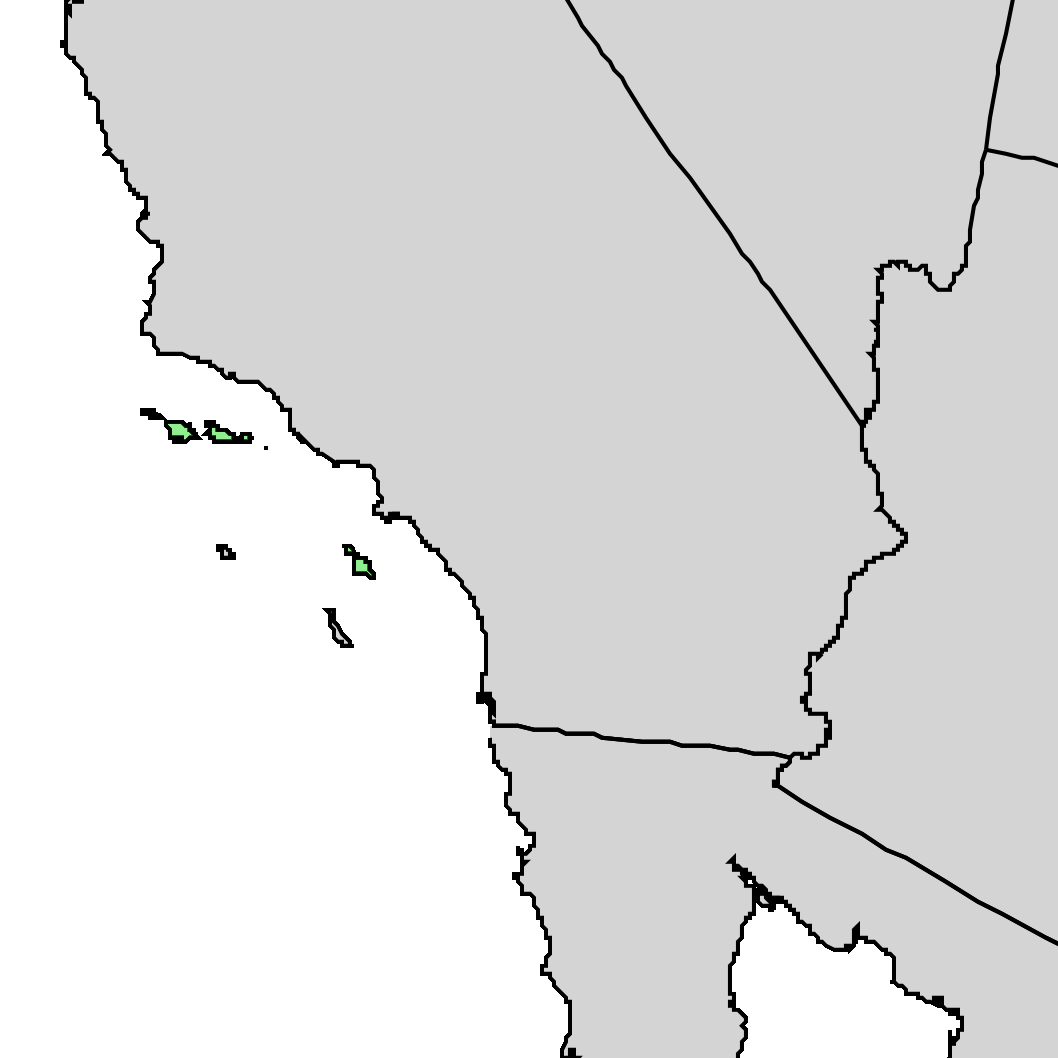
Distribution map for Quercus × macdonaldii, on the California Channel Islands

Quercus × macdonaldii, formerly Quercus macdonaldii, with the common names MacDonald's oak and Macdonald oak, is a rare hybrid species of oak in the family Fagaceae.

== Description ==
The tree is between 5 and 15 meters tall, with scaly bark on the trunk. The twigs are gray and tomentose. The leaves are between 4 and 7 centimeters in length, the blades are oblong to obovate, and adaxially glabrous to sparsely hairy. The petioles are between 3 and 10 millimeters. The fruits cup is between 10 and 20 millimeters long and 6 to 10 millimeters deep. The nuts are between 20 and 35 millimeters long and conic-oblong or ovoid. The flowering time is between the months of March and May.

== Distribution ==
The tree is endemic to the California Channel Islands, on Santa Cruz Island, Santa Rosa Island, and Santa Catalina Island, in Southern California. It is found in chaparral and woodlands habitats in canyons and slopes below 600 metres (2,000 ft).

== Taxonomy ==
The plant was reclassified as Quercus × macdonaldii, a naturally occurring hybrid of Quercus lobata and Quercus pacifica, or possibly other oak species. Both parents are placed in section Quercus. It is considered a species by Greene but derived from hybrids involving Quercus pacifica, Quercus lobata, and possibly others.

== See also ==
- California chaparral and woodlands ecoregion

- California coastal sage and chaparral sub-ecoregion

- Natural history of the Channel Islands of California
