= Theodore Payne Foundation =

California native-plant resource

Theodore Payne Foundation for Wild Flowers & Native Plants
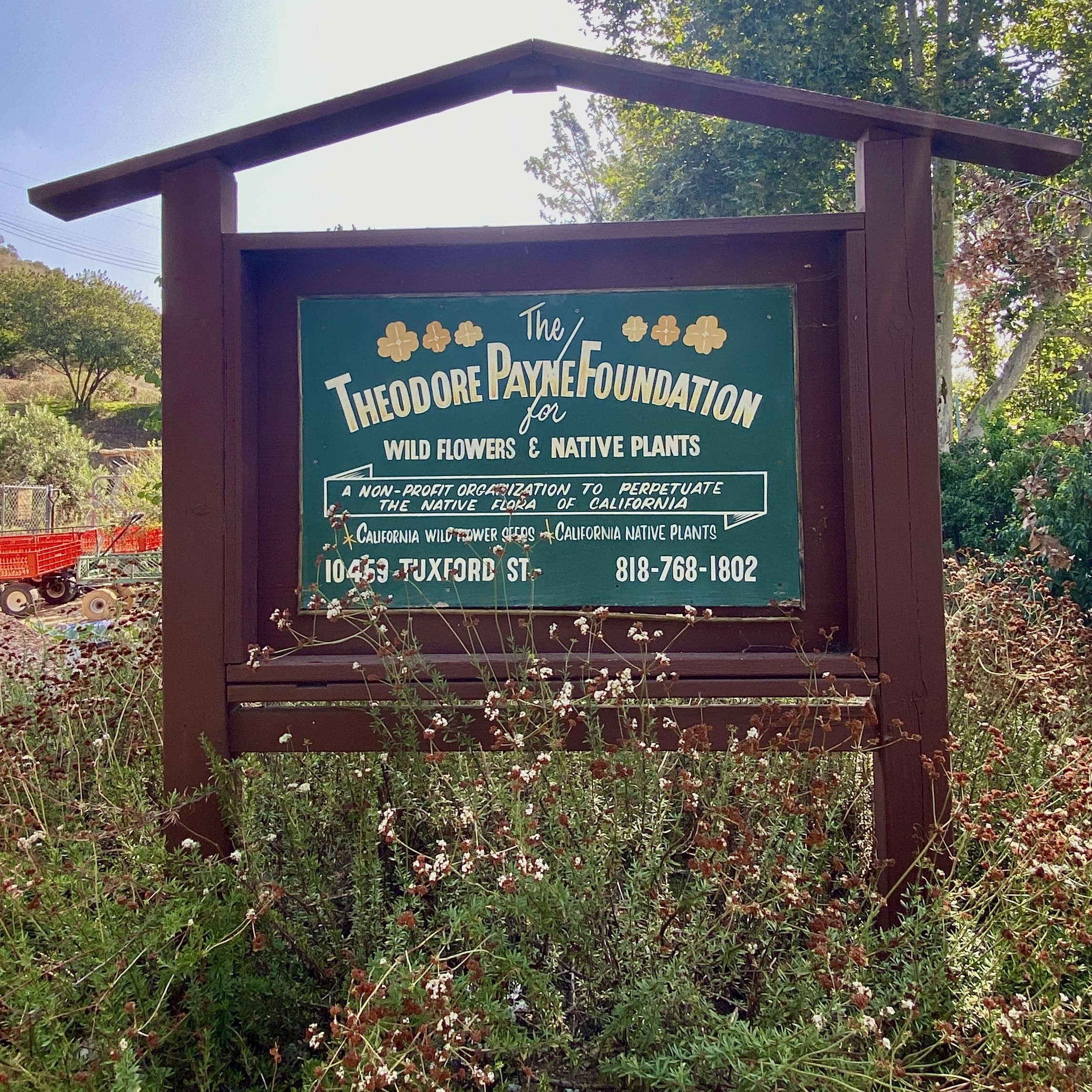
- Interactive map of Theodore Payne Foundation for Wild Flowers & Native Plants
- Type: Plant nursery, Education center, Hiking trails
- Location: 10459 Tuxford Street, Los Angeles, CA 91352-2126
- Coordinates: 34.2373°N 118.3594°W
- Area: 22 acres (8.9 ha)
- Created: 1960; 66 years ago
- Operator: TPF
- Status: Open all year
- Website: Theodore Payne Foundation for Wild Flowers and Native Plants

The Theodore Payne Foundation for Wild Flowers and Native Plants — or TPF, is a private, non-profit organization founded in 1960 to promote the understanding and preservation of California native plants. It continues the work of Theodore Payne, an English horticulturist, gardener, landscape designer, and botanist.

The Foundation is located in Sun Valley, in the northeastern San Fernando Valley and western Verdugo Mountains foothills.

== Programs ==
TPF operates a native plant nursery and education center focused on California natives. Programs include the propagation of a wide range of species and cultivars of the California flora for use in the home landscape; collection and process of seeds from the wild for use in propagation, and courses in the horticulture, botany, and ecology of California native plants for the general public, as well as a volunteer program. Educational programs for children include plant-animal relations, butterflies, and human uses of native plant materials. TPF K-12 education programs

== Events ==
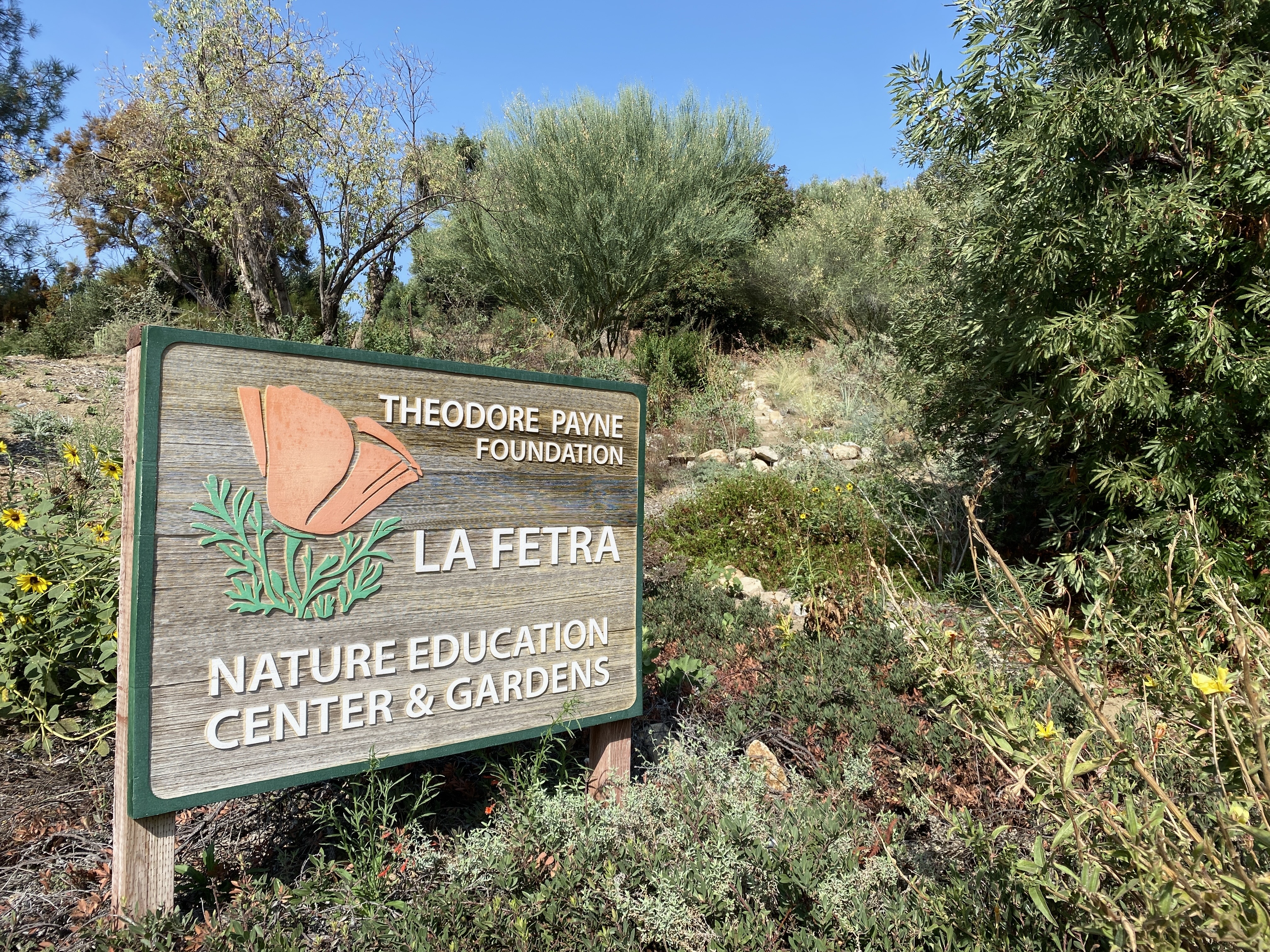
Theodore Payne Foundation Nature Education Center and Gardens

Major events include an Annual Native Plant Garden Tour in the greater Los Angeles area, featuring gardens with at least 50 percent California native plants, the Wild Flower Hotline providing locations to view Spring wild flowers in California; and changing art gallery exhibits. TPF also does outreach and education at public community events such as the LA Times Festival of Books.

=== Theodore Payne Art Gallery ===
The Theodore Payne Art Gallery exhibits feature historical and contemporary artworks depicting the California flora as botanical illustrations and botanical portrait interpretations, as well as cultural, historical, and other exhibits featuring the California flora.

Historical artists featured in the gallery include Alice Chittenden, Ethel Wickes, Ida Moody, and Jane Pinheiro. Contemporary artists featured include Gene Bauer, Fred Kuretski, Richard Dickey, and Ken Gilliland, and artists Melanie Symonds, Pamela Burgess, Ed Lum, and Elinor Nissley.

== See also ==
- List of California native plants
- Flora of California
