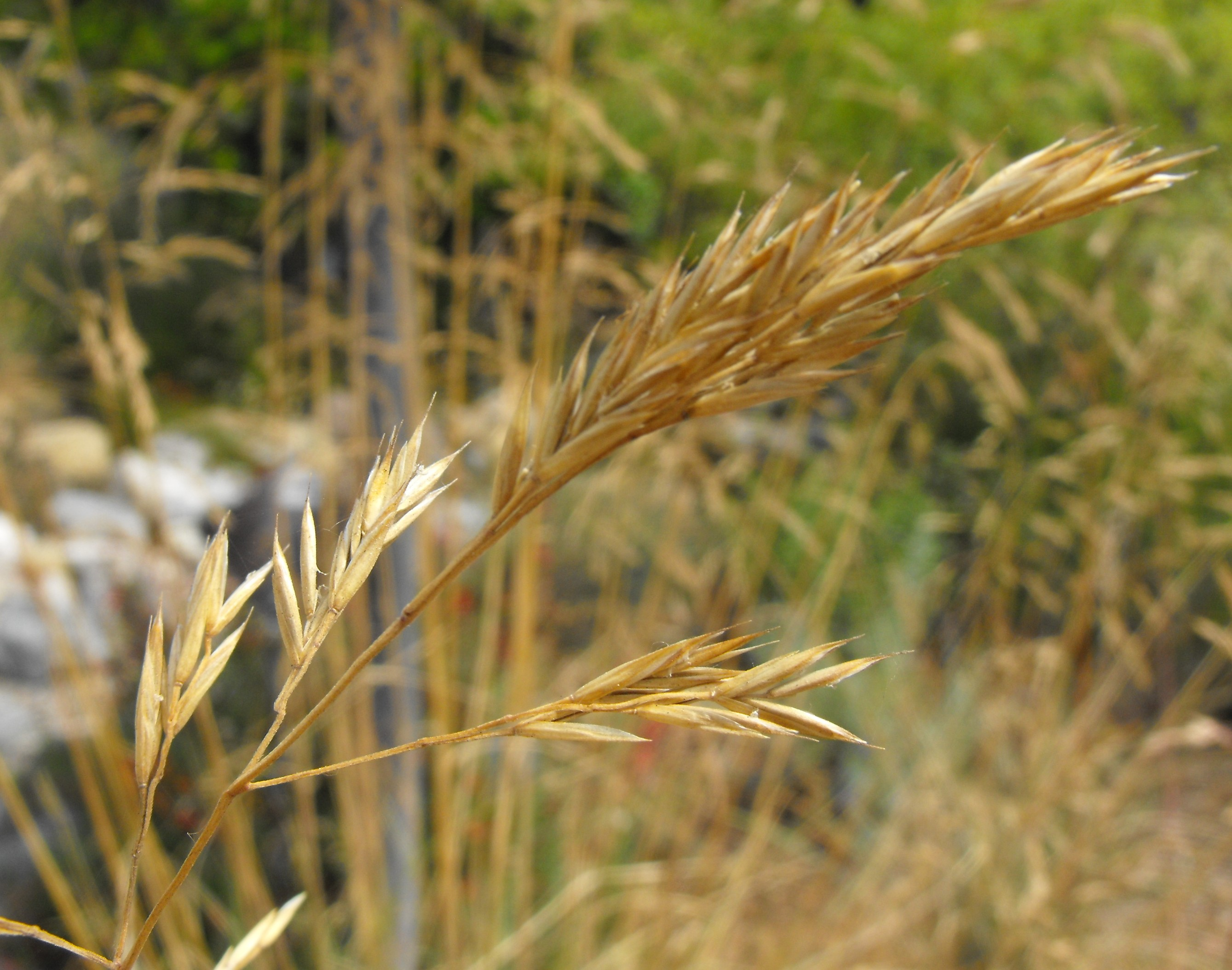

Conservation status
- Secure (NatureServe)

Scientific classification
- Kingdom: Plantae
- Clade: Embryophytes
- Clade: Tracheophytes
- Clade: Angiosperms
- Clade: Monocots
- Clade: Commelinids
- Order: Poales
- Family: Poaceae
- Subfamily: Pooideae
- Genus: Festuca
- Species: F. californica

Binomial name
- Festuca californica Vasey

= Festuca californica =

Species of grass

Festuca californica is a species of grass known by the common name California fescue.

This fescue species is native to the U.S. states of California and Oregon, where it is a member of many plant communities, including chaparral and oak woodlands, the former of which can be found in Northern and Southern coastal California and the latter in Central and Northern California.

== Description ==
Festuca californica is a clumping perennial bunch grass, without rhizomes, that grows in greenish-gray tufts.

It reaches anywhere from 1.5–4.5 feet (0.46–1.37 m) in height, and 1.5–3.5 feet (0.46–1.07 m) in width. The green-gray leaves are narrow and can reach 2 feet (0.61 m) long. Festuca californica has a yellow color when it blooms. Peak blooming time is March, April, May, June, and July.

The inflorescence, on stems reaching up to 6 feet (180 cm), holds spikelets, each 1 to 2 centimeters long. In the spring and summer, the flowers are in large open sprays. The plant reproduces from seed and buds located at the base of the clump.

== Uses ==
=== Cultivation ===
Festuca californica is cultivated as an ornamental grass by specialty plant nurseries for planting in traditional gardens, and as a potted plant for drought-tolerant and wildlife gardens and for natural landscaping projects.

It is planted under Coast live oaks (Quercus agrifolia) in gardens, being a drought-tolerant understory not requiring summer watering, that can endanger the trees. Due to its deep and dense network of roots, it is also planted in landscapes for slope stabilization and erosion control. Its light requirement makes it necessary to be planted in part shade conditions.

==== Cultivars ====
Cultivars are grown, with different foliage color and texture aesthetic variations, including:

- Festuca californica 'Serpentine Blue' — blue grey-green.
- Festuca californica 'River House Blues' (Ron's California Fescue) — chalky blue.
- Festuca californica 'Gabilan Blues' — shiny light blue.
- Festuca californica 'San Rafael Blue' — silver blue-green.
- Festuca californica 'Blue Fountain' - Suncrest Nurseries — chalky blue.

=== Restoration ===
In ecological restoration projects, Festuca californica is used with other local native grasses to restore California coastal prairie habitats.

=== Native Americans ===
People native to California, such as the Pomo people, thatched their houses with Festuca californica to provide warmth during cold seasons.

== See also ==
- List of California native plants
