= Lupinus elmeri =

Conservation status
- Critically Imperiled (NatureServe)

Scientific classification
- Kingdom: Plantae
- Clade: Tracheophytes
- Clade: Angiosperms
- Clade: Eudicots
- Clade: Rosids
- Order: Fabales
- Family: Fabaceae
- Subfamily: Faboideae
- Genus: Lupinus
- Species: L. elmeri

Binomial name
- Lupinus elmeri Greene

Synonyms
- Lupinus albicaulis var. sylvestris (Greene) Lupinus sylvestris (Drew)

Species of legume

Lupinus elmeri is an uncommon species of lupine known by the common names Elmer's lupine and South Fork Mountain lupine. It is endemic to California, where it is known only from a few scattered occurrences in the northernmost slopes of the North Coast Ranges, in Trinity county.

== Description ==
This is an erect perennial herb with a thick reddish stem and green, hairy herbage. It reaches a maximum height near 90 centimetres (35 in). Each palmate leaf is made up of 6 to 10 leaflets up to 6 centimetres (2.4 in) long. The inflorescence bears pale yellow flowers each roughly a centimeter long which are not arranged in whorls as they are in many other lupines. The fruit is a hairy legume pod up to 5 centimetres (2.0 in) long. The bloom period is from the months of July and August. The flowers color is yellow and white. It is most commonly found in the month of July.
