= Penicillium cecidicola =

Scientific classification
- Kingdom: Fungi
- Division: Ascomycota
- Class: Eurotiomycetes
- Order: Eurotiales
- Family: Aspergillaceae
- Genus: Penicillium
- Species: P. cecidicola

Binomial name
- Penicillium cecidicola Seifert, Hoekstra & Frisvad 2004

Synonyms
- Talaromyces cecidicola

Species of fungus

Penicillium cecidicola is a fungus species of the genus of Penicillium which produces pentacecilide A, pentacecilide B, pentacecilide C.

== See also ==
- List of Penicillium species
