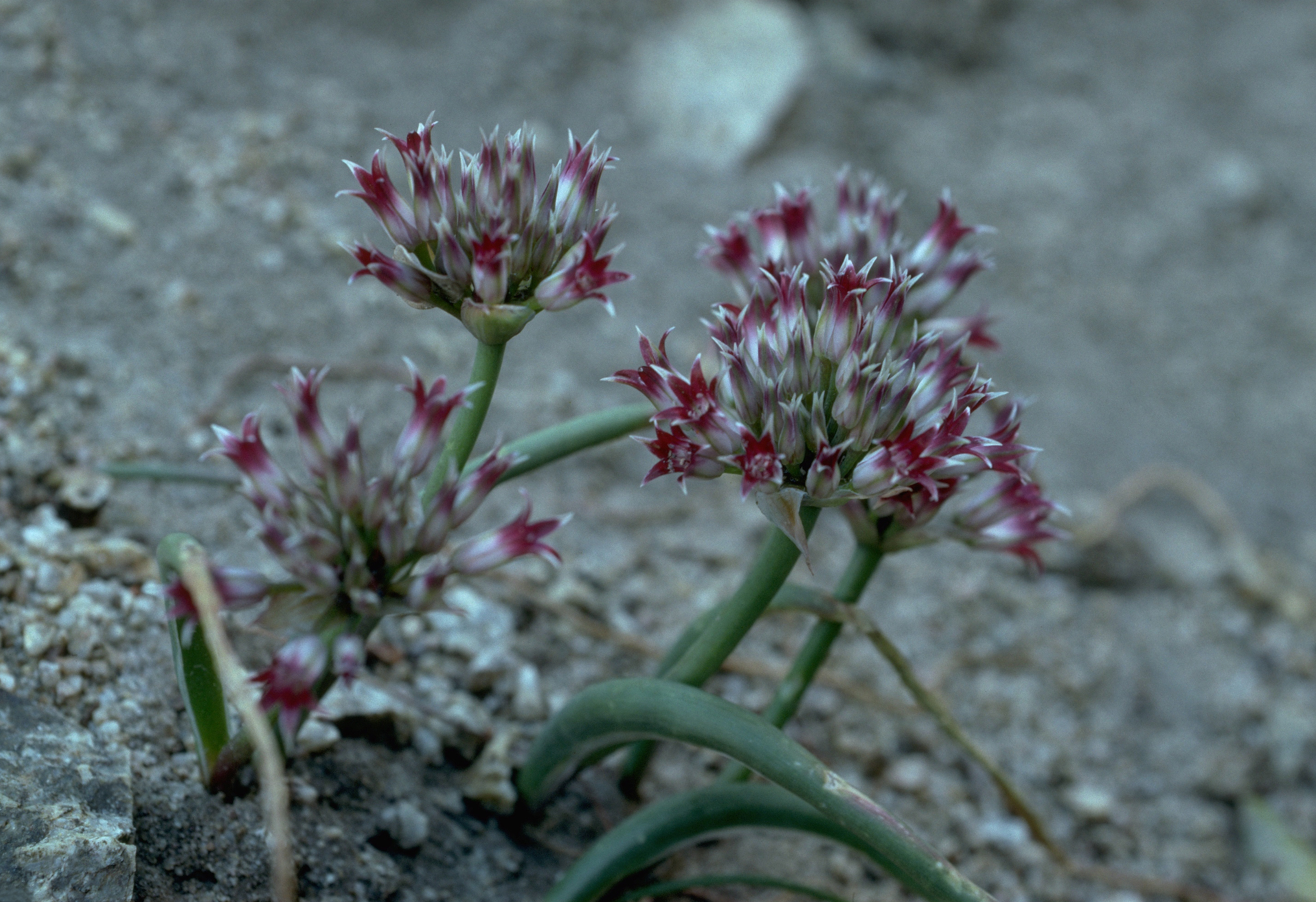

Conservation status
- Imperiled (NatureServe)

Scientific classification
- Kingdom: Plantae
- Clade: Tracheophytes
- Clade: Angiosperms
- Clade: Monocots
- Order: Asparagales
- Family: Amaryllidaceae
- Subfamily: Allioideae
- Genus: Allium
- Species: A. monticola

Binomial name
- Allium monticola Davidson

Synonyms
- Allium monticola subsp. keckii (Munz) Traub & Ownbey; Allium monticola var. keckii (Munz) Ownbey & Aase; Allium parishii var. keckii Munz; Allium peirsonii Jeps.

= Allium monticola =

San Bernardino Mountain onion

Species of flowering plant

Allium monticola is an uncommon species of wild onion known by the common name San Bernardino Mountain onion. It is endemic to southern California, where it is found in the Transverse Ranges and the northernmost section of the Peninsular Ranges. It has been reported from San Bernardino, Los Angeles, Orange, Ventura and Santa Barbara Counties.

Allium monticola generally grows in rocky areas at elevations 1400–3200 m. This onion grows from a bulb one or two centimeters long which often has daughter bulbs attached to it on stalks. The waxy stem reaches a maximum height near 25 centimeters and the single leaf may be a bit longer. The inflorescence contains up to about 25 flowers, each with tepals nearly two centimeters long and white or light pink with darker pink tips. Pollen and anthers are yellow.
