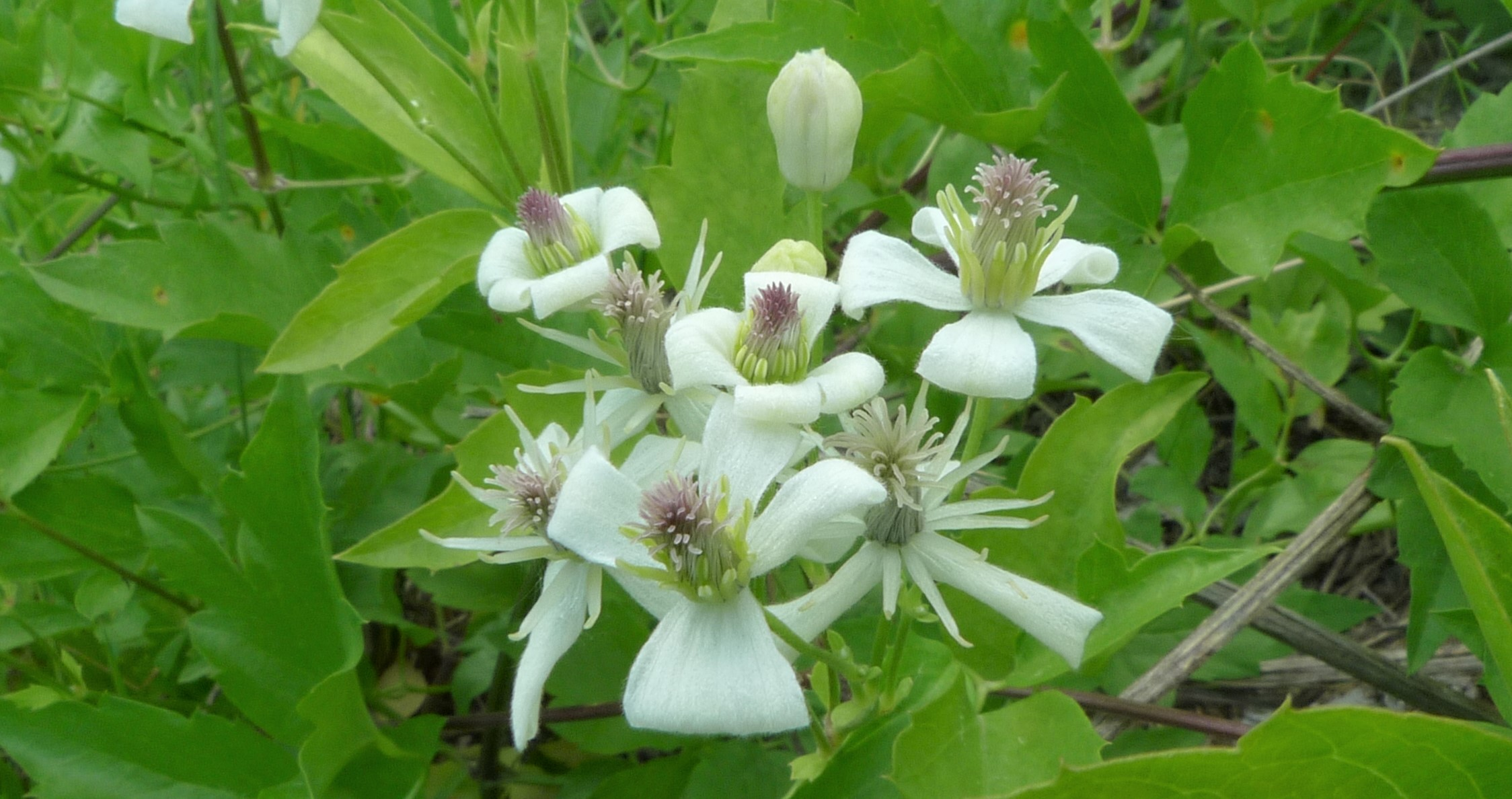

Conservation status
- Secure (NatureServe)

Scientific classification
- Kingdom: Plantae
- Clade: Tracheophytes
- Clade: Angiosperms
- Clade: Eudicots
- Order: Ranunculales
- Family: Ranunculaceae
- Genus: Clematis
- Species: C. ligusticifolia

Binomial name
- Clematis ligusticifolia Nutt.

= Clematis ligusticifolia =

Species of flowering plant in the buttercup family

Clematis ligusticifolia is a climbing, spreading vine with showy flowers. It is also known as old-man's beard, yerba de chiva, and virgin's bower, (though old-man's beard may also refer to C. vitalba, and virgin's bower may also refer to C. lasiantha). It is native to North America where it is widespread across the western United States in streamside thickets, wooded hillsides, and coniferous forests up to 8,500 feet (2,600 m).

It was called "pepper vine" by early travelers and pioneers of the American Old West. They used it as a pepper substitute to spice up food since real black pepper (Piper nigrum) was a costly and rarely obtainable spice. Like the rest of the genus Clematis, it contains essential oils and compounds which are extremely irritating to the skin and mucous membranes. Unlike Black Pepper or Capsicum, however, the compounds in clematis cause internal bleeding of the digestive tract if ingested internally in large amounts. The plants can be toxic if consumed in large enough amounts, and can be toxic to small animals. Native Americans used very small amounts of clematis for migraine headaches and nervous disorders. It was also used as an effective treatment of skin infections. A whole-plant hot water extraction was used to treat eczema, and a leaf compress is used to treat chest pain, sores, and boils.

It is dioecious, with male and female flowers on separate plants.
