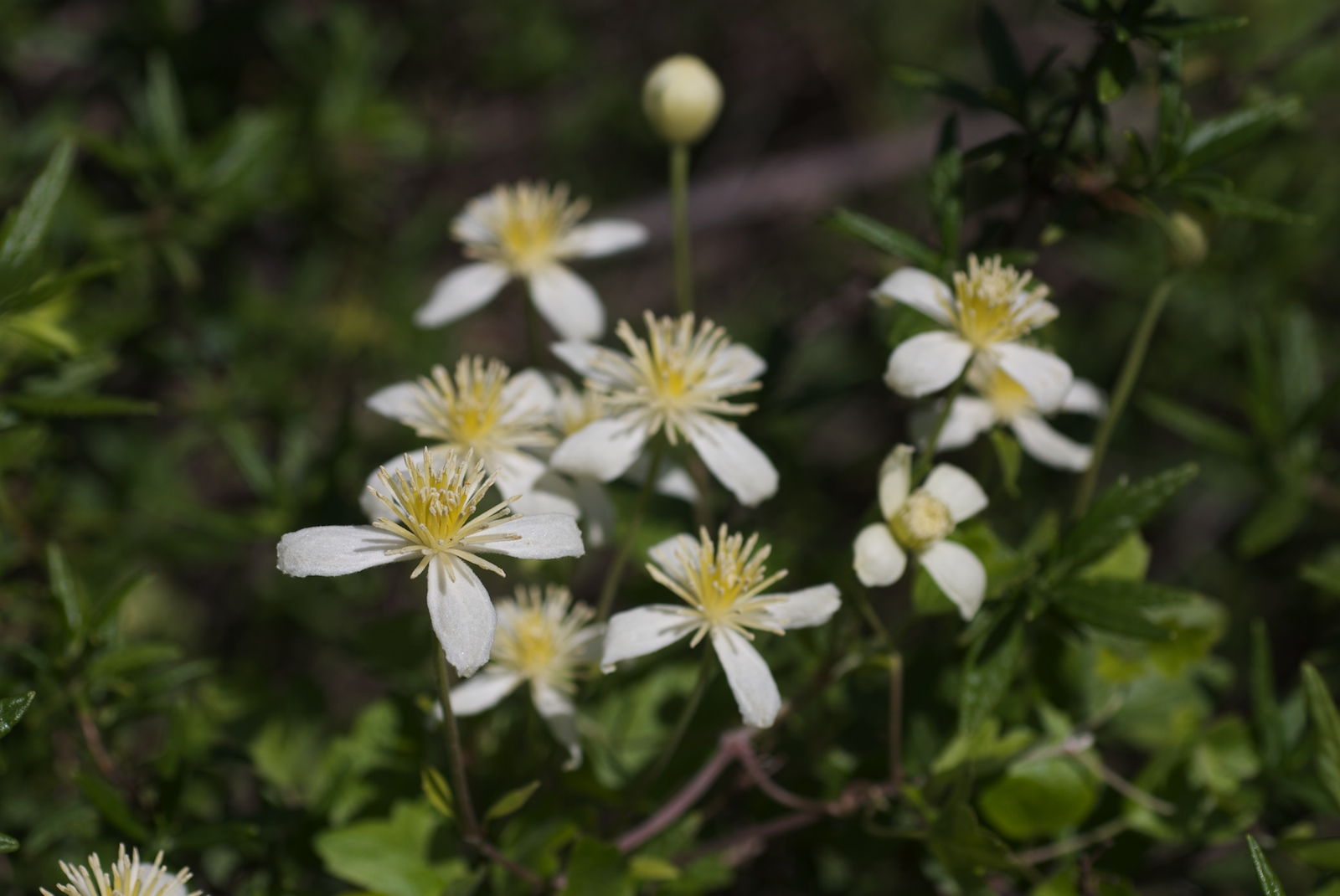
- Clematis lasiantha in Mt. Diablo State Park, Contra Costa County, California

Conservation status
- Apparently Secure (NatureServe)

Scientific classification
- Kingdom: Plantae
- Clade: Embryophytes
- Clade: Tracheophytes
- Clade: Angiosperms
- Clade: Eudicots
- Order: Ranunculales
- Family: Ranunculaceae
- Genus: Clematis
- Species: C. lasiantha

Binomial name
- Clematis lasiantha Nutt.

= Clematis lasiantha =

Species of flowering plant in the buttercup family

Clematis lasiantha, the pipestem clematis or chaparral clematis, is a creamy-white flowering liana vine, belonging to subgenus Clematis of the large genus Clematis.

== Distribution ==
It is found on the Pacific coast of North America, from the San Francisco Bay Area southwards into Baja California. It extends as far east as the western foothills of the Sierra Nevada mountains, but does not grow in the Central Valley, nor at heights greater than about 2,000 metres (6,600 ft). It grows on hillsides, in chaparral, and in open woodland.

== Description ==
Clematis lasiantha, the pipestem clematis, flowers from January to June. Its leaves are 3-lobed, and generally grow groups of three to five leaflets, the largest leaves on the plant normally being between 3 and 5 cm in size. The pipestem clematis can be distinguished from the similar (but much more widely ranging) virgin's bower by the fact that pipestems normally only have one flower on each stalk, and at most three, whereas the virgin's bower has multiple flowers on each stem. The pipestem also has more pistils in each flower, but since both species have many, this is not an easy criterion to apply. The virgin's bower is more likely to be found along streams or in other wet places, whereas the pipestem tolerates more open, drier places. The plant attracts butterflies.
