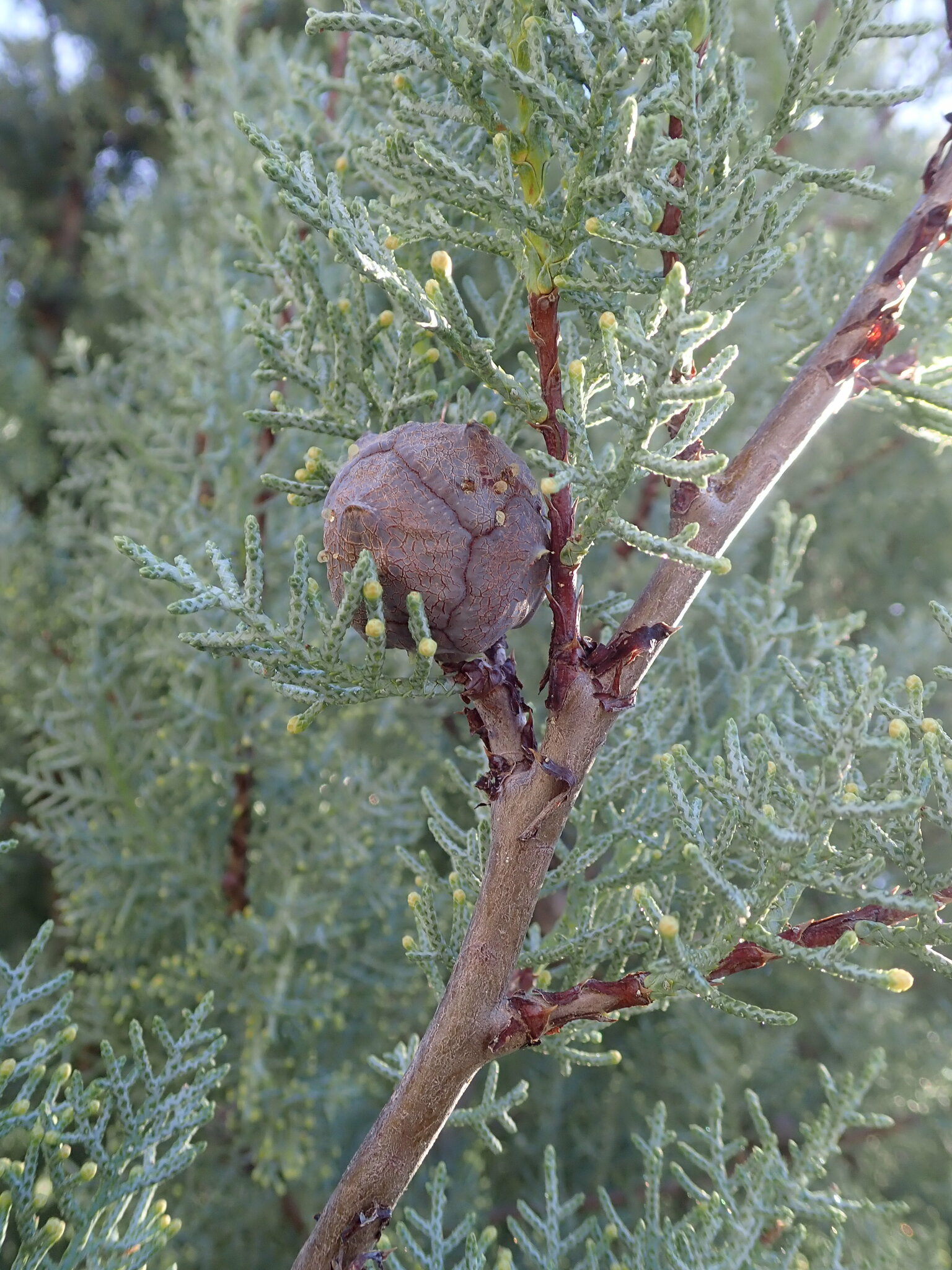
- Hesperocyparis arizonica (Arizona cypress) foliage and cone

Conservation status
- Least Concern (IUCN 3.1)

Scientific classification
- Kingdom: Plantae
- Clade: Tracheophytes
- Clade: Gymnosperms
- Division: Pinophyta
- Class: Pinopsida
- Order: Cupressales
- Family: Cupressaceae
- Genus: Hesperocyparis
- Species: H. arizonica

Binomial name
- Hesperocyparis arizonica (Greene) Bartel
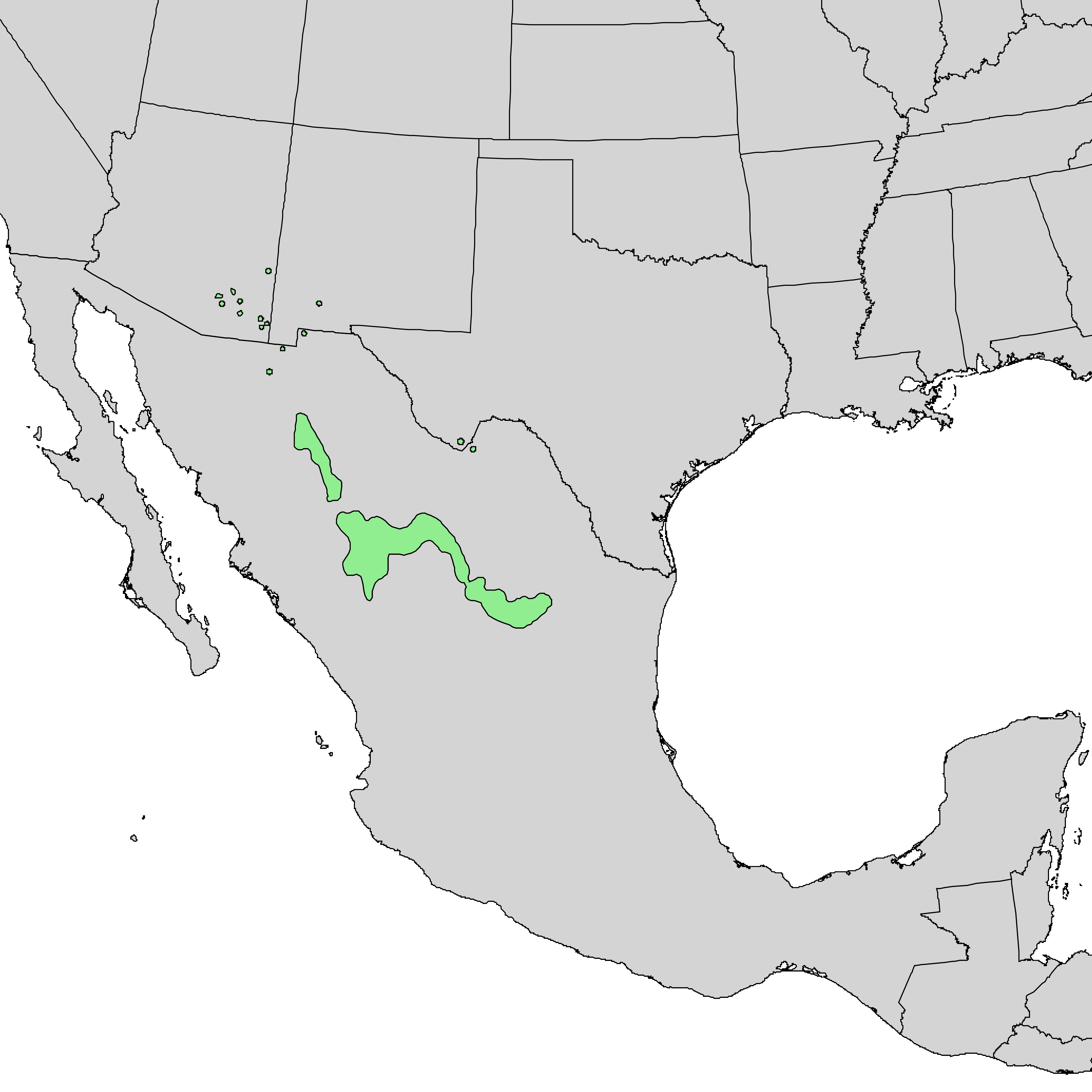
- Natural range of Hesperocyparis arizonica

Synonyms
- List: Callitropsis arizonica (Greene) D.P.Little; Cupressus arizonica Greene; Cupressus arizonica var. bonita Lemmon; Cupressus arizonica var. compacta C.K.Schneid.; Cupressus arizonica f. compacta (C.K.Schneid.) Rehder; Cupressus arizonica glauca Woodall; Cupressus arizonica f. glauca (Woodall) Rehder; Cupressus arizonica f. glomerata Martínez; Cupressus arizonica f. minor Martínez; Cupressus arizonica f. typica Martínez; Cupressus benthamii var. arizonica (Greene) Mast.; Cupressus lusitanica subsp. arizonica (Greene) Maire; Neocupressus arizonica (Greene) de Laub.

= Hesperocyparis arizonica =

Species of conifer

Hesperocyparis arizonica, the Arizona cypress, is a species of conifer in the cypress family, Cupressaceae, native to the southwestern United States and Mexico. Populations may be scattered rather than in large, dense stands.

== Description ==
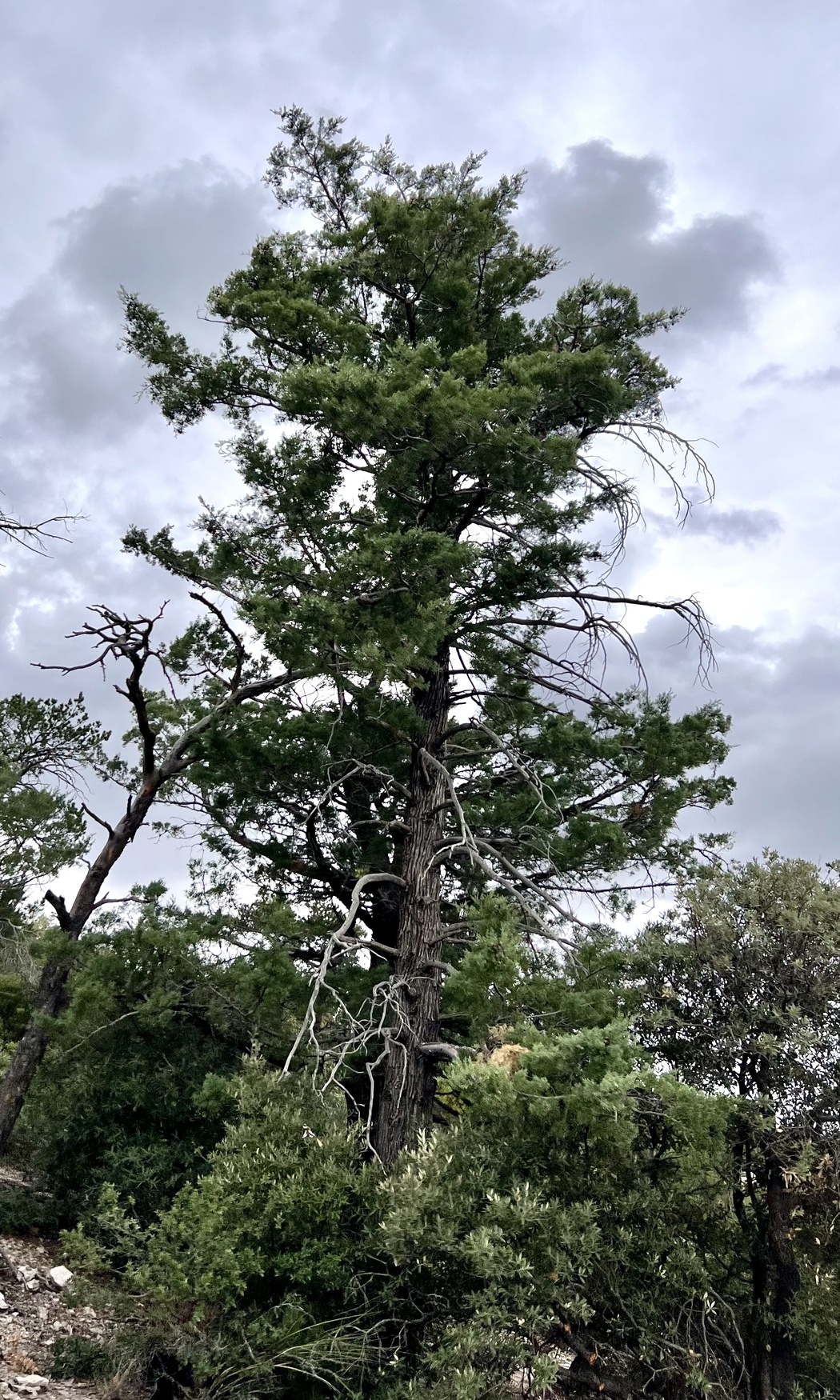
Hesperocyparis arizonica tree in Chiricahua National Monument, Arizona

Hesperocyparis arizonica is a coniferous tree with a conic to ovoid-conic crown. It grows to heights of 10–25 m (33–82 ft), and its trunk diameter reaches 55 cm (22 in). The foliage grows in dense sprays, varying from dull gray-green to bright glaucous blue-green. The leaves are scale-like, 2–5 mm long, and produced on rounded (not flattened) shoots. The seed cones are globose to oblong, 15–33 mm long, with 6 or 8 (rarely 4 or 10) scales, green at first, maturing gray or gray-brown about 20–24 months after pollination. The cones remain closed for many years, only opening after the bearing branch is killed (in a wildfire or otherwise), allowing the seeds to colonize the bare ground exposed by the fire. The male cones are 3–5 mm long, and release pollen in February–March.

== Taxonomy ==
Hesperocyparis arizonica was given its first scientific name and described by Edward Lee Greene in 1882 as Cupressus arizonica, placing it in genus Cupressus. This description was soon after disputed by Maxwell T. Masters who, in 1896, published a journal article where he said it should be considered a subspecies of Cupressus benthamii with the variety name of arizonica. A similar classification reducing it to a subspecies as Cupressus lusitanica subsp. arizonica was posthumously published by René Maire in 1952. There also have been publications that suggested moving it as a species to a different genus such as Callitropsis in 2006 and a new genus, Neocupressus, in 2009.

As of 2024 Plants of the World Online (POWO), World Flora Online (WFO), and the USDA Natural Resources Conservation Service PLANTS database (PLANTS) list H. arizonica as the correct species name. This classification was published by Jim A. Bartel in 2009. However, Cupressus continues to be used in professional papers by some scientists.

Other disagreements have been over the validity of various subspecies of H. arizonica. A total of eleven have been validly published. However seven of these are listed as synonyms by POWO and WFO as of 2024. The remaining four are listed as separate species:

- Hesperocyparis glabra formerly Cupressus arizonica var. glabra – Smooth Arizona cypress
- Hesperocyparis montana formerly Cupressus arizonica var. montana – San Pedro Mártir cypress
- Hesperocyparis nevadensis formerly Cupressus arizonica var. nevadensis – Paiute cypress
- Hesperocyparis stephensonii formerly Cupressus arizonica var. stephensonii – Cuyamaca cypress

== Distribution ==
Hesperocyparis arizonica is found mainly in northern Mexico in the states of Chihuahua, Coahuila, Durango, Tamaulipas, and Zacatecas. It is also found in small areas of the southwestern United States in the southern parts of Arizona, New Mexico, and Texas. In the US it is found at 1,000–1,500 m (3,000–5,000 ft) elevation, while in Mexico it reaches as high as 2,200 m (7,200 ft) in some forests. In the wild, the species is often found in small, scattered populations, not necessarily in large forests. An example occurrence is within the Sierra Juárez and San Pedro Mártir pine–oak forests of Mexico, where it is found along with canyon live oak and California fan palm.

== Uses ==
Arizona cypress is widely cultivated as an ornamental tree. Unlike Monterey cypress, it has proved highly resistant to cypress canker, caused by the fungus Seiridium cardinale, and growth is reliable where this disease is prevalent.

The cultivar 'Pyramidalis' has gained the Royal Horticultural Society's Award of Garden Merit (confirmed 2017).

== Example of neoendemism and conservation challenges ==
The ease of hybridization of western cypress species in the American southwest has fostered a parallel history of taxonomic disagreements of where genus and species distinctions should apply. It thus provides a case study of neoendemism in conifers. Close taxonomic relatedness, in turn, offers both challenges and opportunities if and when assisted migration is considered as a mode of climate adaptation to prevent extinctions of endemic cypresses in the American southwest.
