= Conidium =

Asexual, non-motile spore of a fungus

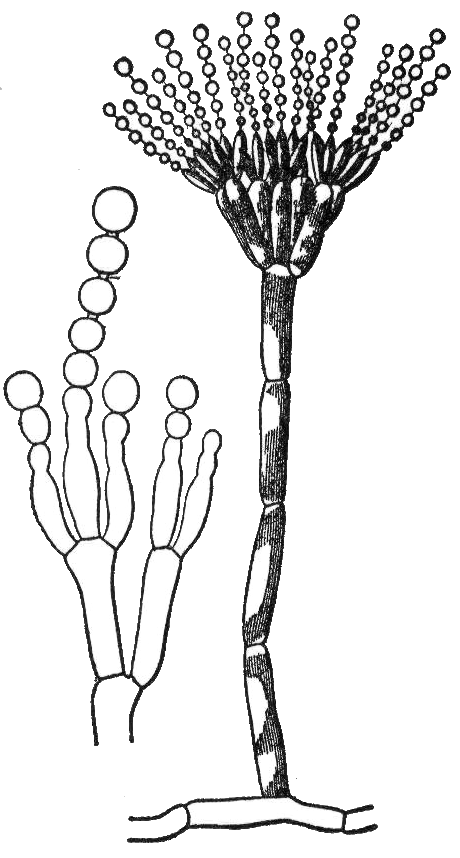
Conidia on conidiophores

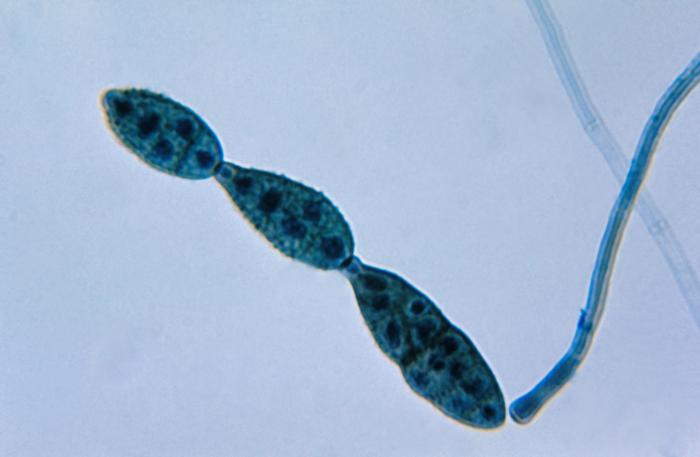
Chain of conidia of Alternaria

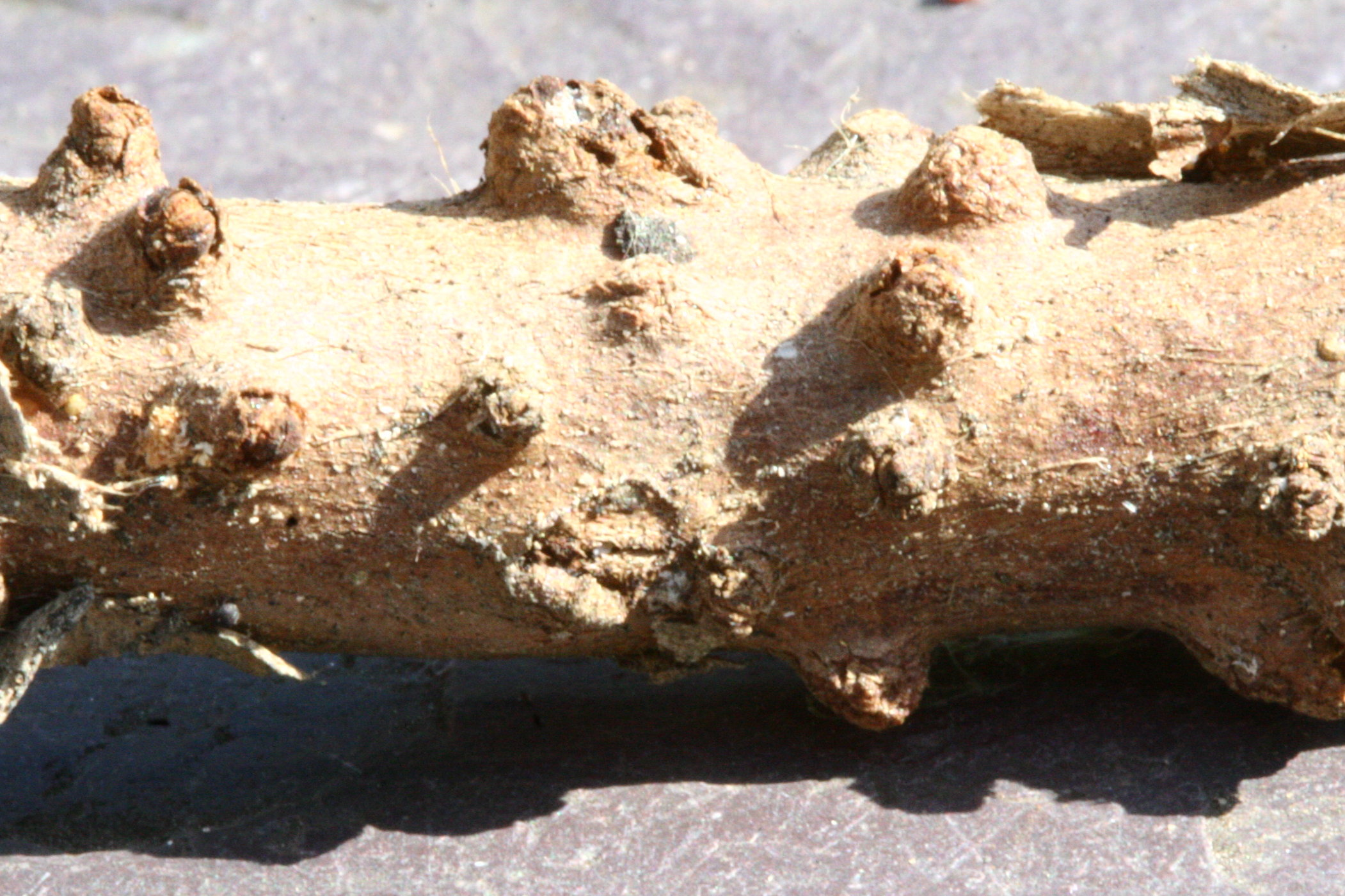
Conidiomata of Cypress canker (probably Seiridium cardinale) erupting on a Thuja twig

A conidium (/kəˈnɪdiəm, koʊ-/ kə-NID-ee-əm, koh-; pl.: conidia), sometimes termed an asexual chlamydospore or chlamydoconidium (pl.: chlamydoconidia), is an asexual, non-motile spore of a fungus. The word conidium comes from the Ancient Greek word for dust, κόνις (kónis). Some conidia are also called mitospores due to the way they are generated through the cellular process of mitosis. They are produced exogenously. The two new haploid cells are genetically identical to the haploid parent, and can develop into new organisms if conditions are favorable, and serve in biological dispersal.

Asexual reproduction in ascomycetes and basidiomycetes is by the formation of conidia, which are borne on specialized stalks called conidiophores. The morphology of these specialized conidiophores is often distinctive between species and, before the development of molecular techniques at the end of the 20th century, was widely used for identification of (e.g. Metarhizium) species. In aquatic environments, like on driftwood or in streams, conidiogenesis are common strategies.

The terms microconidia and macroconidia are sometimes used.

== Conidiogenesis ==
There are two main types of conidium development:

- Blastic conidiogenesis, where the spore is already evident before it separates from the conidiogenic hypha which is giving rise to it, and
- Thallic conidiogenesis, where first a cross-wall appears and thus the created cell develops into a spore.

=== Conidia germination ===
A conidium may form germ tubes (germination tubes) and/or conidial anastomosis tubes (CATs) in specific conditions. These two are some of the specialized hyphae that are formed by fungal conidia. The germ tubes will grow to form the hyphae and fungal mycelia. The conidial anastomosis tubes are morphologically and physiologically distinct from germ tubes. After conidia are induced to form conidial anastomosis tubes, they grow homing toward each other, and they fuse. Once fusion happens, the nuclei can pass through fused CATs. These are events of fungal vegetative growth and not sexual reproduction. Fusion between these cells seems to be important for some fungi during early stages of colony establishment. The production of these cells has been suggested to occur in 73 different species of fungi.

=== Germination in Aspergillus ===
As evidenced by recent literature, conidia germination of Aspergillus, a common mold, specifically is of interest. Aspergillus is not only a familiar fungus found across various different settings in the world, but it poses a danger for immunocompromised individuals, as inhaled Aspergillus conidia could germinate inside the respiratory tract and cause aspergillosis, a form of pulmonary infection, and continual developments of aspergillosis such as new risk groups and the resistance against antifungal drugs.

==== Stages of Germination: Dormancy ====
Germination in Aspergillus follows a sequence of three different stages: dormancy, isotropic growth, and polarized growth. The dormant conidia are able to germinate even after an year of remaining at room temperature, due to their resilient intracellular and extracellular characteristics, which enable them to undergo harsh conditions like dehydration, variation in osmotic pressure, oxidation, and temperature, and change in UV exposure and acidity levels. These abilities of the dormant conidia are dictated by a few central regulatory proteins, which are the main drivers of the conidia and conidiophore formation. One of these proteins, the developmental regulatory protein wetA, has been found to be particularly essential; in wetA-defective mutants have reduced tolerance to external factors mentioned above, and exhibit weak synthesization of the conidial cell wall. In addition to these central regulators, some notable groups of genes/proteins include other regulatory proteins like the velvet regulator proteins, which contribute to fungal growth, and other molecules that target specific unfavorable intra and extracellular conditions, like heat shock proteins.

==== Stages of Germination: Isotropic and Polarized Growth ====
The phases following dormancy include isotropic growth, in which increased intracellular osmotic pressure and water uptake causes swelling of the conidia and increased cellular diameter, and polarized growth, in which the swelling from isotropic growth directs the growth to one side of the cell, and leads to the formation of a germ tube. First, however, the conidia must go through the stage of breaking dormancy. In some species of Aspergillus, dormancy is broken when the dormant conidia is introduced to a carbon source in the presence of water and air, while in other species, the mere presence of glucose is enough to trigger it. The dense outer layer of the dormant conidia is shed and the growth of the hyphae cells begins, which has a significantly different composition compared to the dormant conidia cell. Breaking of dormancy involves transcription, but not translation; protein synthesis inhibitors prevent isotropic growth, while DNA and RNA synthesis inhibitors do not, and the start of breaking of dormancy is accompanied by and increase in transcripts for genes for biosynthesis of proteins, and immediate protein synthesis. Following the expansion of the cell via isotropic growth, studies have observed many new proteins emerging from the processes in the breaking of dormancy and transcripts associated with remodeling of the cell wall, suggesting that remodeling of the cell wall is a central process during isotropic growth. In the polarized growth stage, upregulated and overexpressed proteins and transcripts included ones involved in synthesis of chitin (a major component of the fungal cell wall), mitosis and DNA processing, remodeling of cell morphology, and ones in germ tube formation pertaining to infection and virulence factors.

=== Structures for release of conidia ===
Conidiogenesis is an important mechanism of spread of plant pathogens. In some cases, specialized macroscopic fruiting structures perhaps 1 mm or so in diameter containing masses of conidia are formed under the skin of the host plant and then erupt through the surface, allowing the spores to be distributed by wind and rain. One of these structures is called a conidioma (plural: conidiomata).

Two important types of conidiomata, distinguished by their form, are:

- pycnidia (singular: pycnidium), which are flask-shaped, and
- acervuli (singular: acervulus), which have a simpler cushion-like form.

Pycnidial conidiomata or pycnidia form in the fungal tissue itself, and are shaped like a bulging vase. The conidia are released through a small opening at the apex, the ostiole.

Acervular conidiomata, or acervuli, are cushion-like structures that form within the tissues of a host organism:

- subcuticular, lying under the outer layer of the plant (the cuticle),
- intraepidermal, inside the outer cell layer (the epidermis),
- subepidermal, under the epidermis, or deeper inside the host.

Mostly they develop a flat layer of relatively short conidiophores which then produce masses of spores. The increasing pressure leads to the splitting of the epidermis and cuticle and allows release of the conidia from the tissue.

== Health issues ==
Conidia are always present in the air, but levels fluctuate from day to day and with the seasons. An average person inhales at least 40 conidia per hour. Exposure to conidia from certain species, such as those of Cryptostroma corticale, is known to cause hypersensitivity pneumonitis, an occupational hazard for forest workers and paper mill employees.

Conidia are often the method by which some normally harmless but heat-tolerating (thermotolerant), common fungi establish infection in certain types of severely immunocompromised patients (usually acute leukemia patients on induction chemotherapy, AIDS patients with superimposed B-cell lymphoma, bone marrow transplantation patients (taking immunosuppressants), or major organ transplant patients with graft versus host disease). Their immune system is not strong enough to fight off the fungus, and it may, for example, colonise the lung, resulting in a pulmonary infection. Especially with species of the Aspergillus genus, germination in the respiratory tract can lead to aspergillosis, which is quite common, can vary in severity, and has shown signs of developing new risk groups and antifungal drug resistance.

== See also ==
- Arthroconidium
- Ascocarp
- Basidiocarp
- Budding
- Gemma
- Phialide
