= Tilloidea notata =

Scientific classification
- Kingdom: Animalia
- Phylum: Arthropoda
- Class: Insecta
- Order: Coleoptera
- Suborder: Polyphaga
- Infraorder: Cucujiformia
- Family: Cleridae
- Subfamily: Tillinae
- Genus: Tilloidea
- Species: T. notata

Binomial name
- Tilloidea notata ( Klug, 1842)

Synonyms
- Tillus bipartitus Blanchard, 1853; Tillus distinctus White, 1849; Tillus lewisii Gorham, 1878; Tillus multicolor Fairmaire, 1886; Tillus multipartitus Fairmaire, 1888; Tillus notatus Klug, 1842; Tillus quadricolor Heller, 1921

Species of beetle

Tilloidea notata, is a species of checkered beetle found in India, Sri Lanka, Sumatra, Philippines, China, Japan.

== Biology ==
Adult female lays about 90 to 400 eggs in egg masses. Life span of the adult ranges from 21 to 62 days.

It is a predator of Phloeosinus aubei, Dinoderus minutus, Dinoderus ocellaris, Lasioderma serricorne, Rhyzopertha dominica, Sitophilus zeamais, and Stegobium paniceum.
