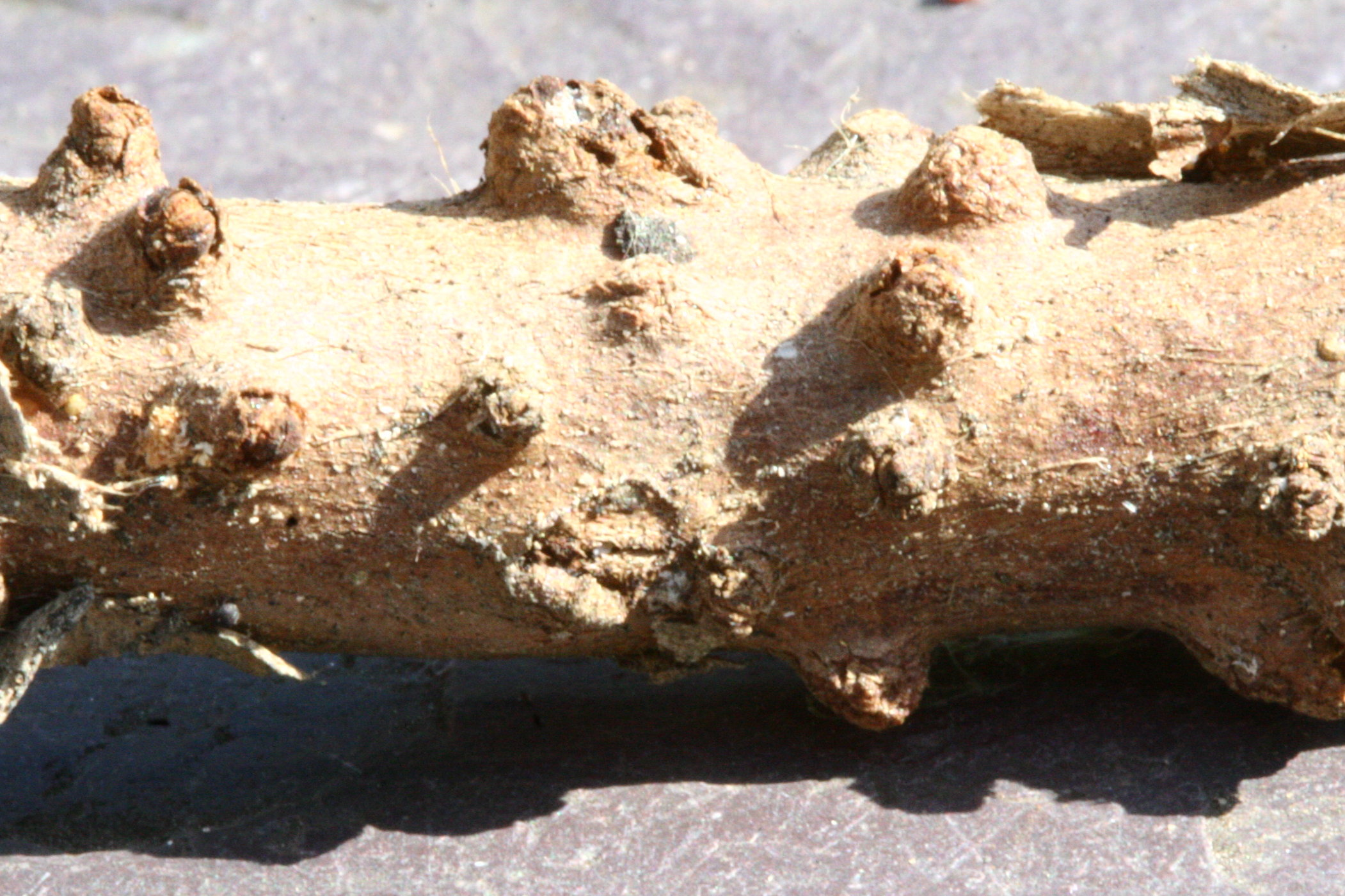
- Asexual fructifications of Cypress canker disease

Scientific classification
- Kingdom: Fungi
- Division: Ascomycota
- Class: Sordariomycetes
- Order: Amphisphaeriales
- Family: Amphisphaeriaceae
- Genus: Lepteutypa; Petr. (1923)

Type species
- Lepteutypa fuckelii (Nitschke) Petr. (1923)

= Lepteutypa =

Genus of fungi

Lepteutypa is a genus of plant pathogens in the family Amphisphaeriaceae. First described by the Austrian mycologist Franz Petrak in 1923, the genus contains 10 species according to a 2008 estimate. It was increased to 15 in 2020.

The genus Lepteutypa is teleomorphic (reproducing sexually) and the corresponding anamorphic name, used to describe the asexual form, is Seiridium (formerly Coryneum). For instance, the name Seiridium cupressi can still be used for the anamorphic form of that species, but now that it is known that a sexual stage exists, the name Seiridium cupressi should be preferred for the species as a whole. On the other hand, no sexual stage of species Seiridium cardinale is known, so that is its only name. Other separate species of Seiridium have also found, so it is now classed as a genus in its own right as well.

Seiridium cardinale is important to gardeners and foresters as they cause the devastating Cyprus canker disease on Cupressus, Thuja, and related conifers in Northern Europe, America, Australia, and New Zealand. S. cardinale is from California and was introduced to Europe around the 1930s, probably from infected nursery stock. A separate introduction affected the southern hemisphere.

== Species ==
As accepted by Species Fungorum;

- Lepteutypa alpestris (Ellis & Everh.) M.E. Barr (1993)
- Lepteutypa biseptata Petr. (1954)
- Lepteutypa fuckelii Petr. (1923)
- Lepteutypa fusispora Petr. (1953)
- Lepteutypa hederae (Fuckel) Rappaz (1995)
- Lepteutypa hexagonalis Goh & K.D. Hyde (1997)
- Lepteutypa podocarpi (Butin) Aa (1987)
- Lepteutypa sabalicola (Ellis & G. Martin) M.E. Barr (1993)
- Lepteutypa tropicalis Dulym., Sivan., P.F. Cannon & Peerally (2001)
- Lepteutypa ulmicola (Ellis & Everh.) M.E. Barr (1993)

Former species;

- L. aquatica Z.L. Luo, K.D. Hyde & H.Y. Su (2019) = Amphisphaeria neoaquatica, Amphisphaeriaceae
- L. concentrica (M.E. Barr) Arx (1981) = Pestalotiopsis guepinii, Sporocadaceae
- L. cupressi (Nattrass, C. Booth & B. Sutton) H.J. Swart (1973) = Seiridium cupressi, Sporocadaceae
- L. elaeidis (C. Booth & J.S. Robertson) Arx (1981) = Pseudopestalotiopsis elaeidis, Sporocadaceae
- L. hippophaes (Sollm.) Arx (1970) = Hymenopleella hippophaicola, Amphisphaeriaceae
- L. indica (Punith.) Arx (1970) = Hyalotiella subramanianii, Sporocadaceae
- L. qujingensis Dissan., J.C. Kang & K.D. Hyde (2020) = Amphisphaeria qujingensis, Amphisphaeriaceae
- L. sambuci Jaklitsch & Voglmayr (2016) = Amphisphaeria sambuci, Amphisphaeriaceae
- L. uniseptata (C.K.M. Tsui, K.D. Hyde & Hodgkiss) Jaklitsch & Voglmayr (2016) = Amphisphaeria uniseptata, Amphisphaeriaceae
