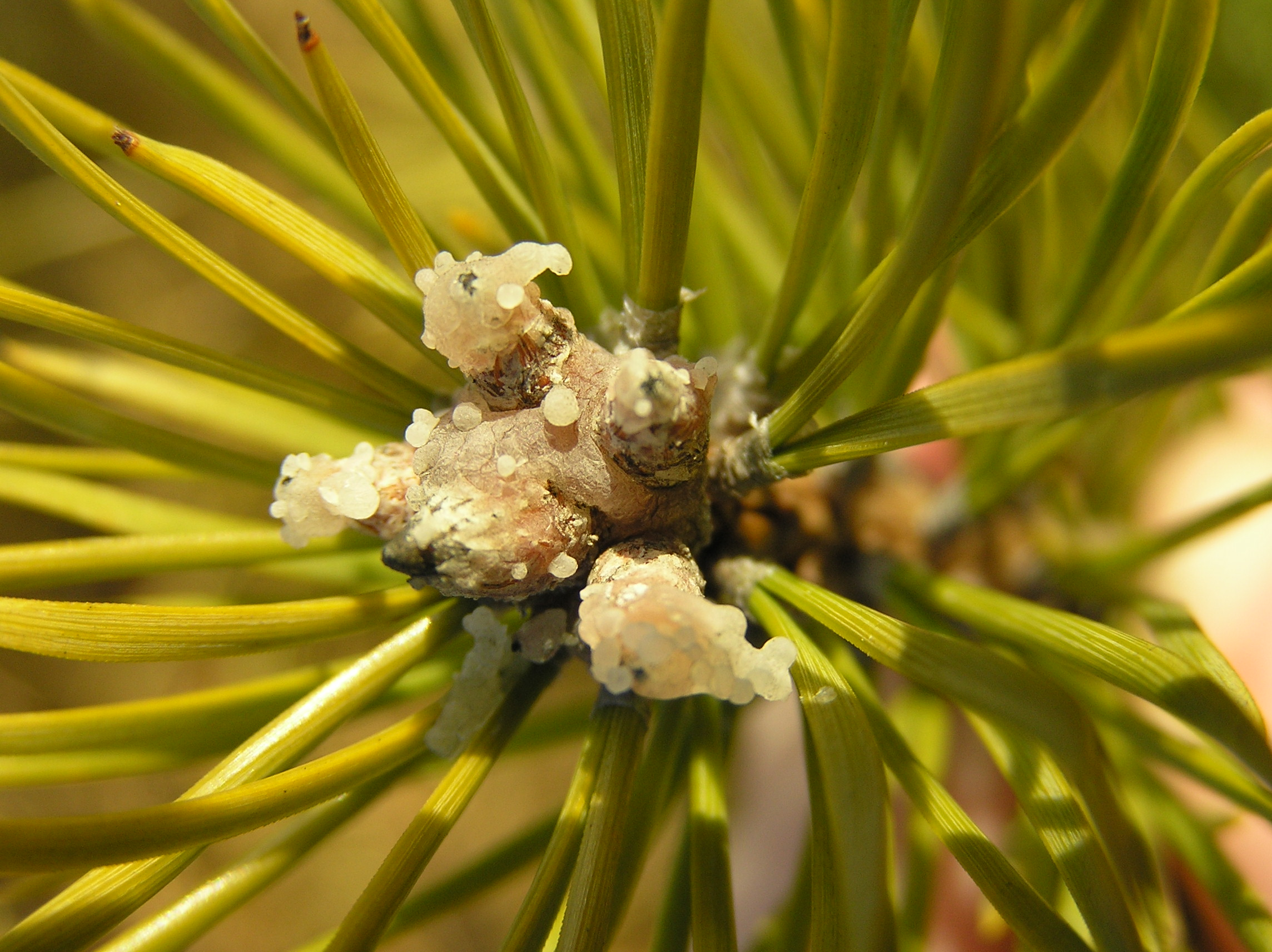
- Canker caused by Gremmeniella abietina

Scientific classification
- Kingdom: Fungi
- Division: Ascomycota
- Class: Leotiomycetes
- Order: Helotiales
- Family: Helotiaceae
- Genus: Gremmeniella; M. Morelet

Type species
- Gremmeniella abietina (Lagerb.) M. Morelet

Species
- G. abietina G. laricina

= Gremmeniella =

Genus of fungi

Gremmeniella is a genus of fungi in the family Helotiaceae. The genus contains at least 3 species.

The genus name of Gremmeniella is in honour of J. Gremmen (fl. 1953) a Dutch botaniker (Mycology), plant pathologist, from the Forest Research Station T.N.O. in Wageningen.

The genus was circumscribed by Michel Morele in Bull. Soc. Sci. Nat. Archéol. Toulon & Var vol.183 on page 9 in 1969.

Gremmeniella abietina is a plant pathogen that causes scleroderris canker.

== Species ==
- Gremmeniella abietina
- Gremmeniella juniperina
- Gremmeniella laricina
- Gremmeniella pinicola
- Gremmeniella baggina
