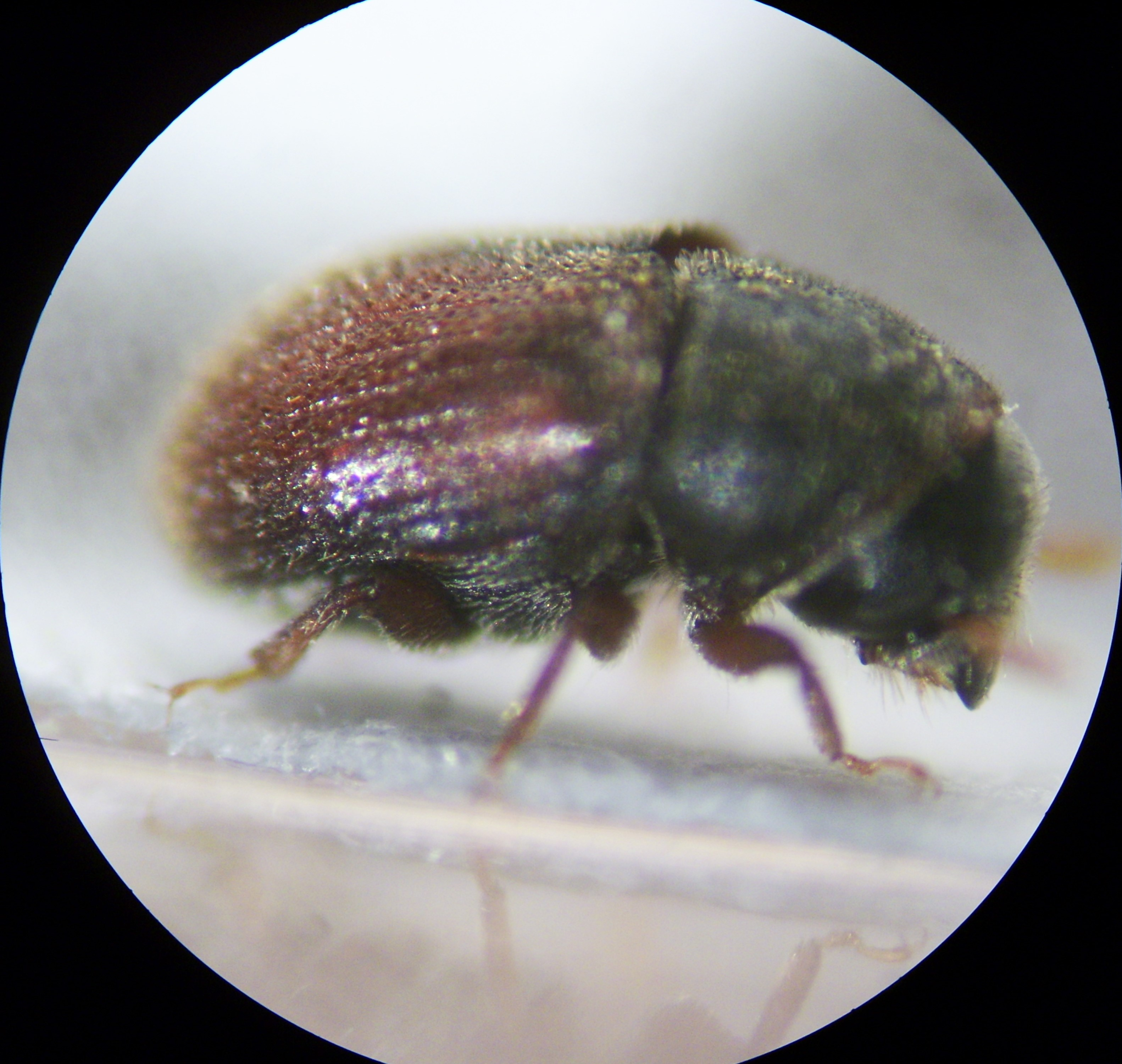

Scientific classification
- Kingdom: Animalia
- Phylum: Arthropoda
- Class: Insecta
- Order: Coleoptera
- Suborder: Polyphaga
- Infraorder: Cucujiformia
- Family: Curculionidae
- Genus: Phloeosinus
- Species: P. aubei

Binomial name
- Phloeosinus aubei Perris, 1855

Synonyms
- Phloeosinus bicolor Bedel; Phloeosinus hercegovinensis Eggers

= Phloeosinus aubei =

Species of bark beetle

Phloeosinus aubei is a species of bark beetle in the family Curculionidae. It is commonly known as the cedar bark beetle, eastern juniper bark beetle, or small cypress bark beetle.

== Description ==
Adult members of Phloeosinus aubei are 2-2.7 millimeters (mm) long. Its dorsum has many small points and small hairs. The thorax is a darker color than the elytra, and it has clearly visible stripes that run front to back. Larvae of the species are a whitish color with a brown head.

== Distribution and habitat ==
Phloeosinus aubei is native to the Caucasus, Anatolia, and around the Mediterranean from Israel to France. Over the past century, the species' distribution has expanded northward into Central Europe due to climate change and more susceptible host populations, and it is now considered an invasive species in several Central European nations. For example, it has been present in the Czech Republic since at least the 1950s, and is now widely distributed across the country.

== Ecology ==
Phloeosinus aubei is an invasive pest species which damages or possibly kills its host trees, which are typically cypresses, junipers, and thujas. The beetle is capable of flying up to 24 km (15 mi), and has strong dispersal capabilities and ability to locate its host trees. In the Czech Republic, it is typically found in the common juniper, Juniperus communis, and it is considered to be a threat to that species, which is near-threatened.

P. aubei has several natural parasites. Dendrosoter protuberans and Theocolax phloeosini parasitize the species at all stages of its life, while Eurytoma morio parasitizes the larvae and pupae.

P. aubei is a vector for pathogens, including the cypress canker, Seiridium cardinale.
