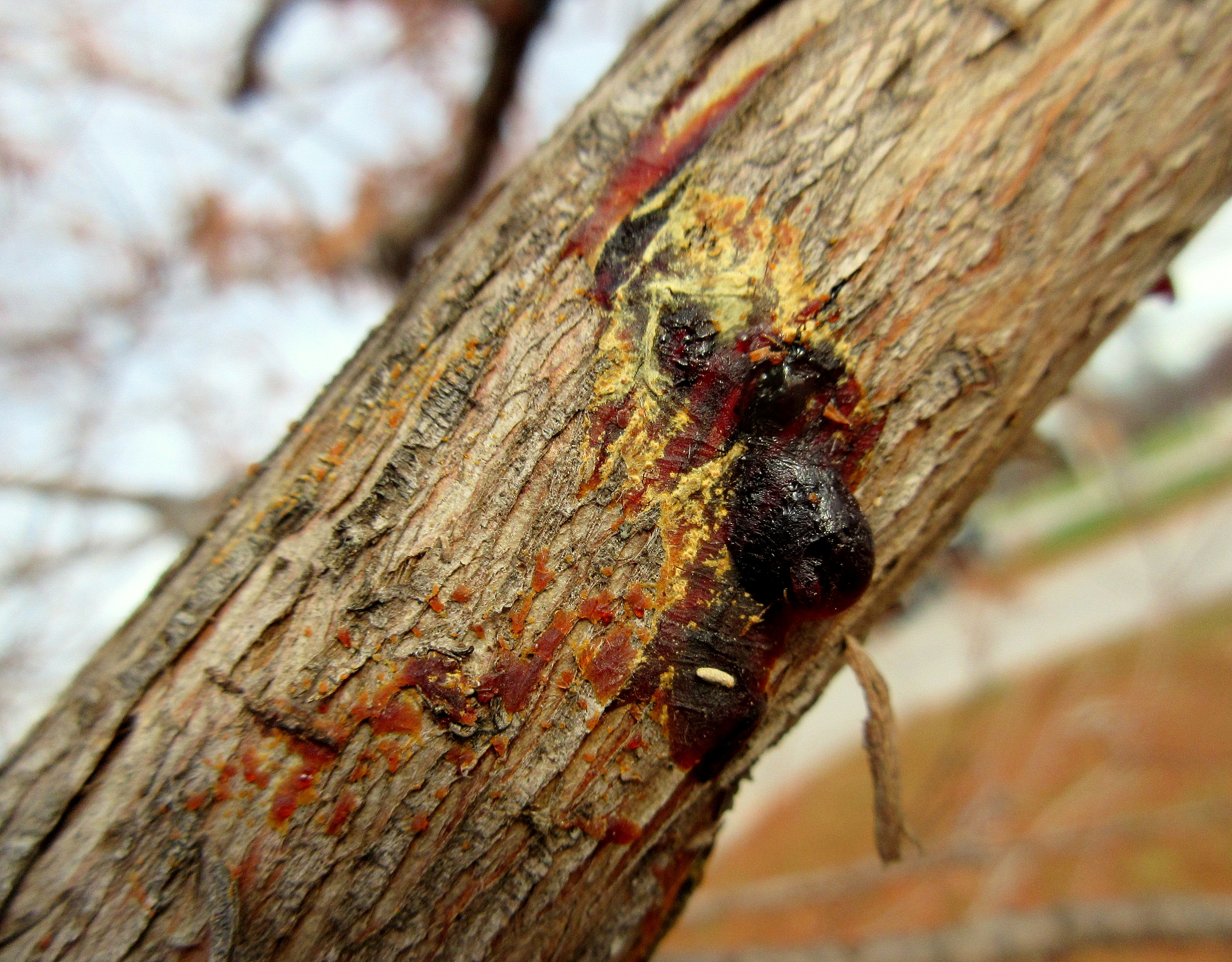
- Teleomorph stage of Lepteutypa cupressi found at Creve Coeur Lake Memorial Park, Maryland Heights, Missouri, USA

Scientific classification
- Kingdom: Fungi
- Division: Ascomycota
- Class: Sordariomycetes
- Order: Amphisphaeriales
- Family: Amphisphaeriaceae
- Genus: Lepteutypa
- Species: L. cupressi

Binomial name
- Lepteutypa cupressi (Nattrass, C. Booth, & B. Sutton) H.J. Swart, (1973)

Synonyms
- Cryptostictis cupressi Monochaetia unicornis Pestalotia unicornis Rhynchosphaeria cupressi Seiridium cupressi Seiridium unicorne

= Lepteutypa cupressi =

Species of fungus

Lepteutypa cupressi is a plant pathogen which causes a disease ("Cypress canker") in Cupressus, Thuja, and related conifer types.

The name Seiridium cupressi (formerly Coryneum cupressi) is for the anamorph of this fungus, that is, it is used for the asexual form. Now that it is known to have a sexual stage the genus name Lepteutypa should take precedence.
