= Phloeosinus dentatus =

Scientific classification
- Domain: Eukaryota
- Kingdom: Animalia
- Phylum: Arthropoda
- Class: Insecta
- Order: Coleoptera
- Suborder: Polyphaga
- Infraorder: Cucujiformia
- Family: Curculionidae
- Genus: Phloeosinus
- Species: P. dentatus

Binomial name
- Phloeosinus dentatus (Say, 1826)

Species of beetle

Phloeosinus dentatus is a species of crenulate bark beetle in the family Curculionidae. It is found in North America.
