= Phloeosinus sequoiae =

Scientific classification
- Kingdom: Animalia
- Phylum: Arthropoda
- Clade: Pancrustacea
- Class: Insecta
- Order: Coleoptera
- Suborder: Polyphaga
- Infraorder: Cucujiformia
- Family: Curculionidae
- Genus: Phloeosinus
- Species: P. sequoiae

Binomial name
- Phloeosinus sequoiae Hopkins, 1903

Species of beetle

Phloeosinus sequoiae is a species of crenulate bark beetle in the family Curculionidae. It is found in North America.
