= Cypress canker =

Plant fungal disease

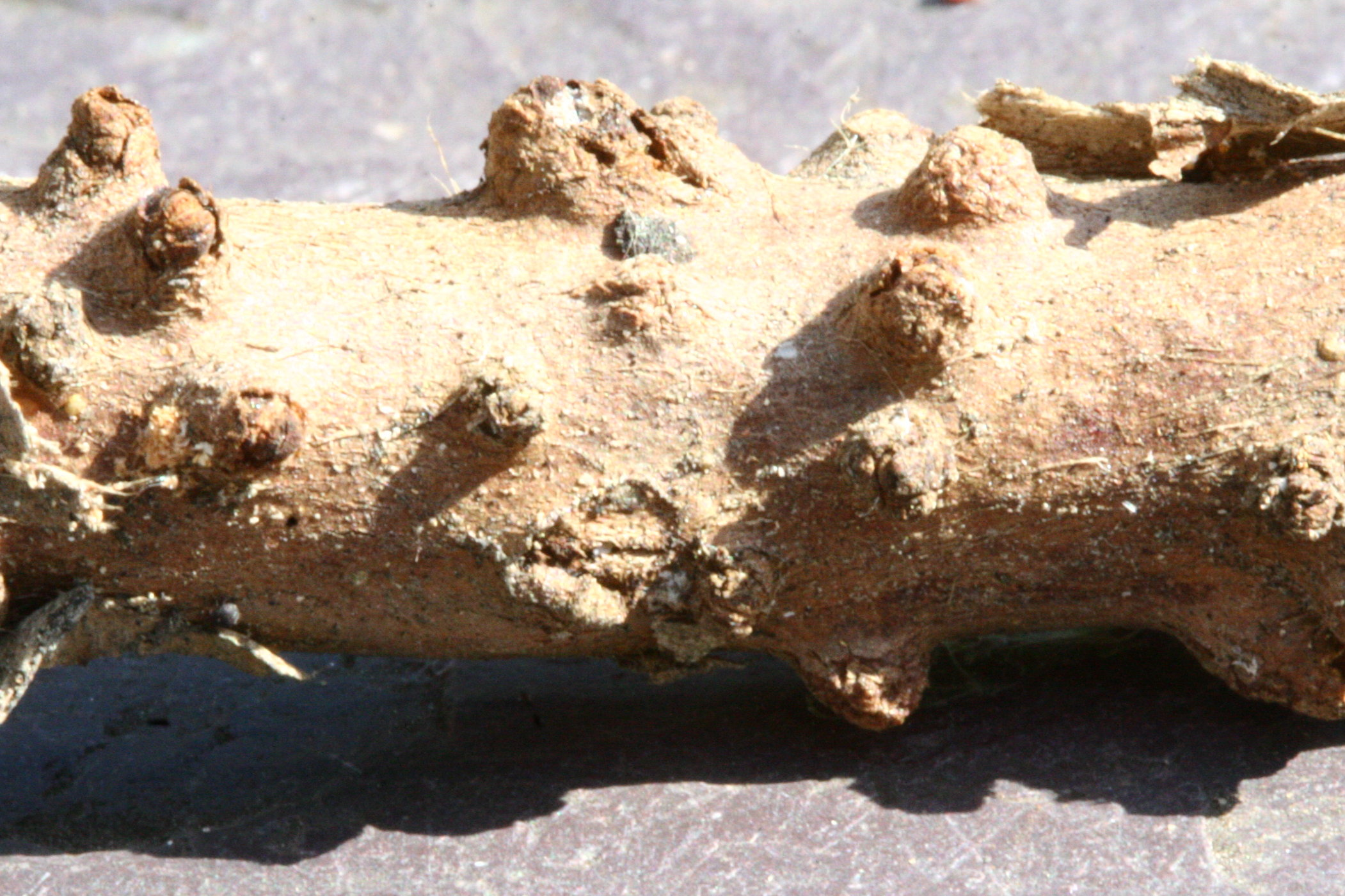
- Asexual fructifications of cypress canker disease
- Causal agents: Seiridium spp.
- Hosts: Cypress trees
- Distribution: Europe, North America, Australia, New Zealand

Cypress canker is a disease affecting Cupressus species, caused by one of several species of fungus in the genus Seiridium. Infection causes die-back of twigs and branches in susceptible cypress trees, with rapidly increasing amounts of damage and the death of the tree.

== History ==
The first epidemic of cypress canker was recorded in California in 1928, with Monterey cypress (Cupressus macrocarpa) being affected. Within a few years the local populations of this tree had been killed. The species is widely traded as an ornamental tree and the disease had soon spread worldwide, probably with nursery stock. Within five decades the disease had reached New Zealand, France, Chile, Italy, Argentina, Greece, most of Europe, Canada, North Africa, South Africa and Australia. The causal agent of this pandemic spread was the pathogenic fungus Seiridium cardinale, with Seiridium cupressi and Seiridium unicorne sometimes being involved, but being less aggressive; other pathogenic fungi can also cause cankers in cypresses.

== Hosts ==
Besides Monterey cypress, other trees attacked by the fungi that cause this canker include Cupressus sempervirens, Cupressus pygmaea, Cupressus lusitanica, Platycladus orientalis, Chamaecyparis lawsoniana, Calocedrus decurrens, Juniperus chinensis and Juniperus sabina. Even when a species is susceptible, environmental factors are important in the development of the disease. In California, for example, Monterey cypresses growing on the coastal ranges were found to be much less affected than those growing in inland areas where the climate was of a Mediterranean type.

== Symptoms ==
The fungal spores gain entry into the tree through natural fissures or through injuries to the bark. The growth of the fungal thalli interferes with the phloem tissue of the host tree, cutting off the flow of sap and eventually killing the branch above the wound. The foliage turns yellow and the branch rapidly dies. A sunken canker with a reddish tinge develops at the original site of infection and resin often oozes out nearby. Each canker is long and narrow and there may be several on one branch. Black circular sporing structures later appear alongside the canker.

== Ecology ==
The disease can be spread between trees by rain splashes, small animals, birds or insects. The spores can gain entry through the stomata and lenticels under optimal conditions and conidia can get washed down branches by water trickles to lodge as new infective sites. The fungus can remain viable in dead tissue for several years. Vectors include bark beetles in the genus Phloeosinus, and the cypress aphid (Cinara cupressi).
