= Phloeosinus serratus =

Scientific classification
- Domain: Eukaryota
- Kingdom: Animalia
- Phylum: Arthropoda
- Class: Insecta
- Order: Coleoptera
- Suborder: Polyphaga
- Infraorder: Cucujiformia
- Family: Curculionidae
- Genus: Phloeosinus
- Species: P. serratus

Binomial name
- Phloeosinus serratus (LeConte, 1868)

Species of beetle

Phloeosinus serratus, the juniper bark beetle, is a species of crenulate bark beetle in the family Curculionidae. It is found in North America.
