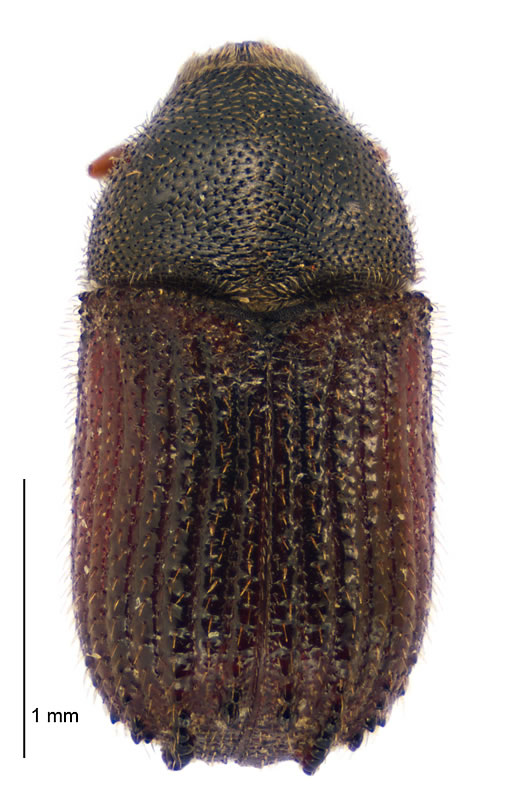

Scientific classification
- Domain: Eukaryota
- Kingdom: Animalia
- Phylum: Arthropoda
- Class: Insecta
- Order: Coleoptera
- Suborder: Polyphaga
- Infraorder: Cucujiformia
- Family: Curculionidae
- Genus: Phloeosinus
- Species: P. cupressi

Binomial name
- Phloeosinus cupressi Hopkins, 1903

= Phloeosinus cupressi =

Species of beetle

Phloeosinus cupressi, the cypress bark beetle, is a species of crenulate bark beetle in the family Curculionidae. It is found in North America.

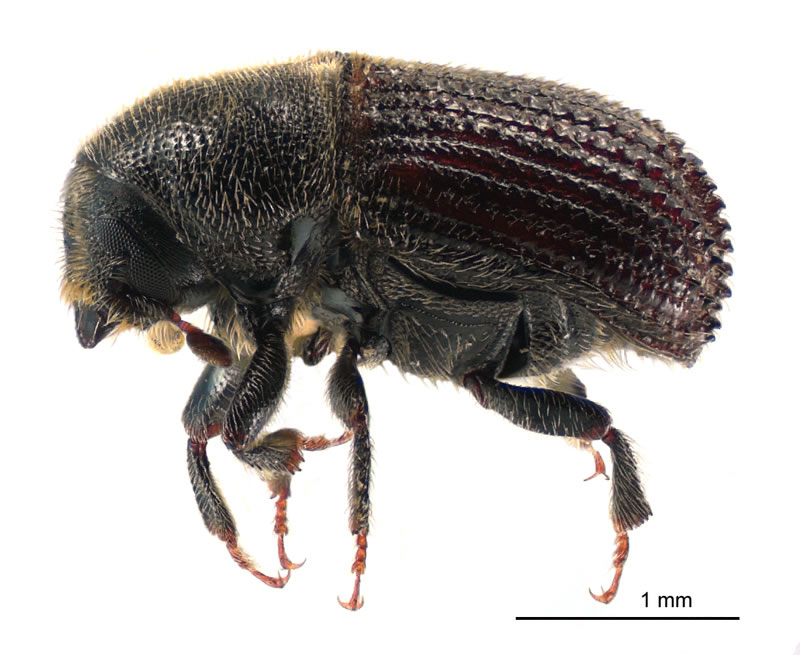
Cypress bark beetle, Phloeosinus cupressi
