= Canker =

Common name for a tree disease

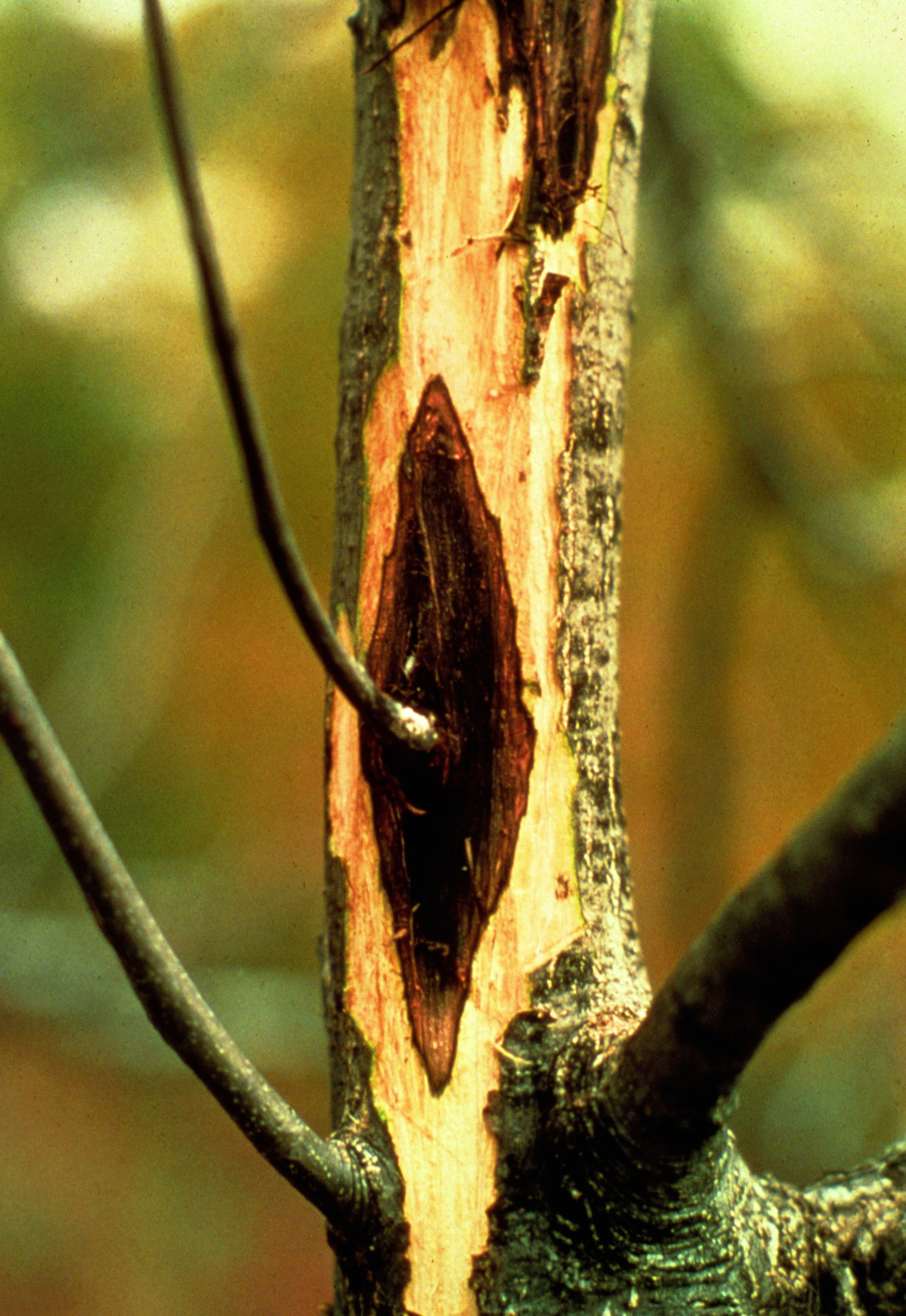
Butternut canker is a lethal disease of butternut trees, and has no cure.

A plant canker is a small area of dead tissue, which grows slowly, often over years. Some cankers are of only minor consequence, but others are ultimately lethal and therefore can have major economic implications for agriculture and horticulture. Their causes include a wide range of organisms such as fungi, bacteria, mycoplasmas and viruses. The majority of canker-causing organisms are bound to a unique host species or genus, but a few will attack other plants. Weather (via frost or windstorm damage) and animal damage can also cause stress to the plant resulting in cankers. Other causes of cankers is pruning when the bark is wet or using un-sterilized tools.

Although fungicides or bactericides can treat some cankers, often the only available treatment is to destroy the infected plant to contain the disease.

== Examples ==
Tree cankers (right) are caused by injuries to the bark that allow pathogens or insects in to infect the tree. Compared above is a healthy tree and segment (left) to a tree infected and containing a canker.

- Apple canker, caused by the fungus Neonectria ditissima (formerly Neonectria galligena.)
- Ash bacterial canker, now understood to be caused by the bacterium Pseudomonas savastanoi, rather than Pseudomonas syringae. After DNA-relatedness studies Pseudomonas savastanoi has been instated as a new species.
- Butternut canker, caused by the fungus Sirococcus clavigignenti-juglandacearum
- Bleeding canker of horse chestnut, caused by the bacterium Pseudomonas syringae pv. aesculi
- Citrus canker, caused by the bacterium Xanthomonas axonopodis
- Cypress canker, caused by the fungus Seiridium cardinale
- Foamy bark canker of oaks in California, caused by the fungus Geosmithia putterillii
- Dogwood anthracnose, caused by the fungus Discula destructiva
- Grape canker, caused by the fungus Eutypa lata
- Honey locust canker, caused by the fungus Thyronectria austro-americana
- Larch canker, caused by the fungus Lachnellula willkommii
- Mulberry canker, caused by the fungus Gibberella baccata
- Oak canker, caused by the fungus Diplodia quercina
- Pine pitch canker, caused by the fungus Fusarium circinatum
- Plane anthracnose, caused by the fungus Apiognomonia veneta
- Poplar canker, caused by the bacterium Xanthomonas populi
- Rapeseed stem canker, caused by the blackleg fungus Leptosphaeria maculans
- Rose cankers, caused by the fungus Leptosphaeria coniothyrium and Cryptosporella umbrina
- Scleroderris canker, caused by the fungus Gremmeniella abietina
- Southwest canker, caused by environmental conditions (frost damage and sun-scalding)
- Strawberry anthracnose, caused by the fungus species complexes Colletotrichum acutatum and C. gloeosporioides (incl. C. fragariae)
- Tomato anthracnose, caused by the fungus Colletotrichum coccodes
- Willow anthracnose, caused by the fungus Marssonina salicicola
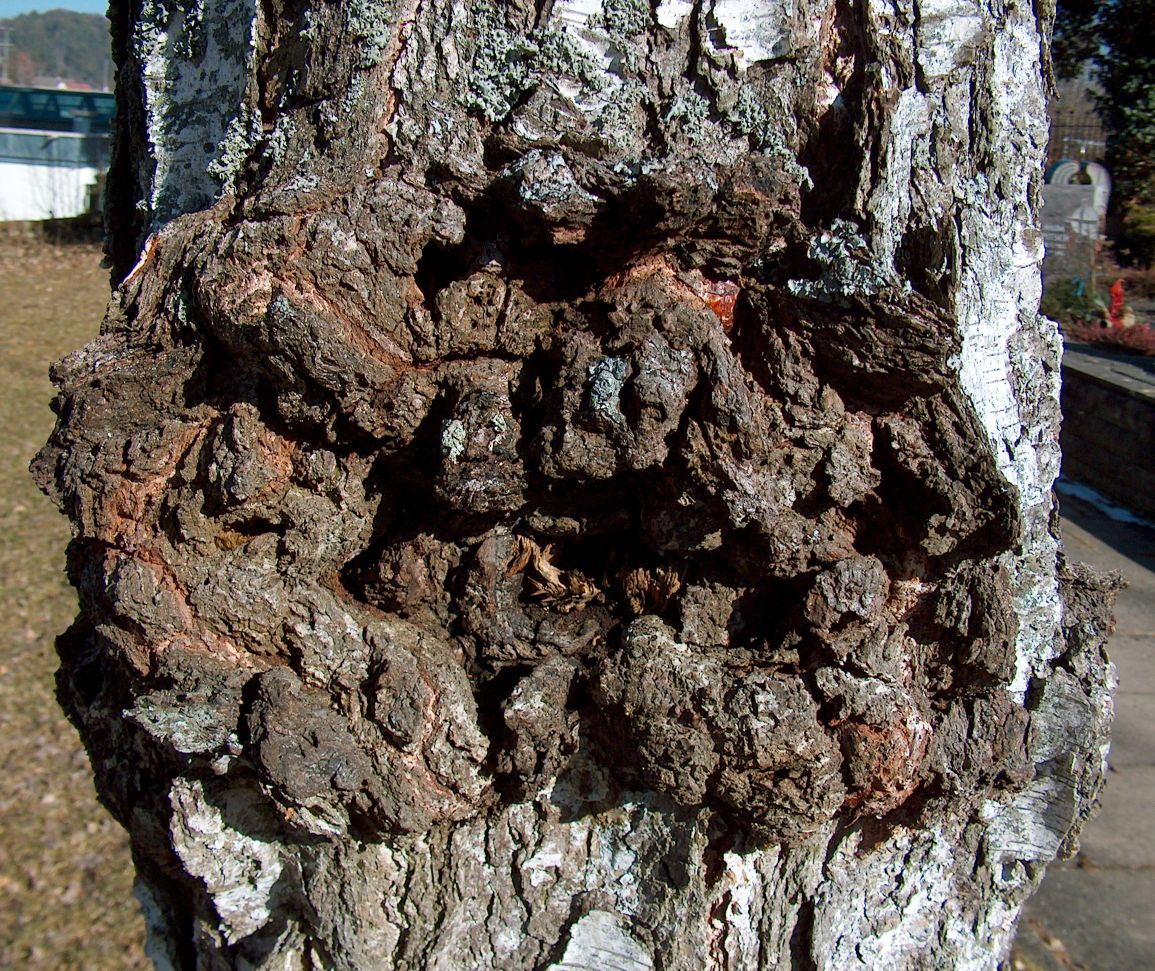
Canker on a birch

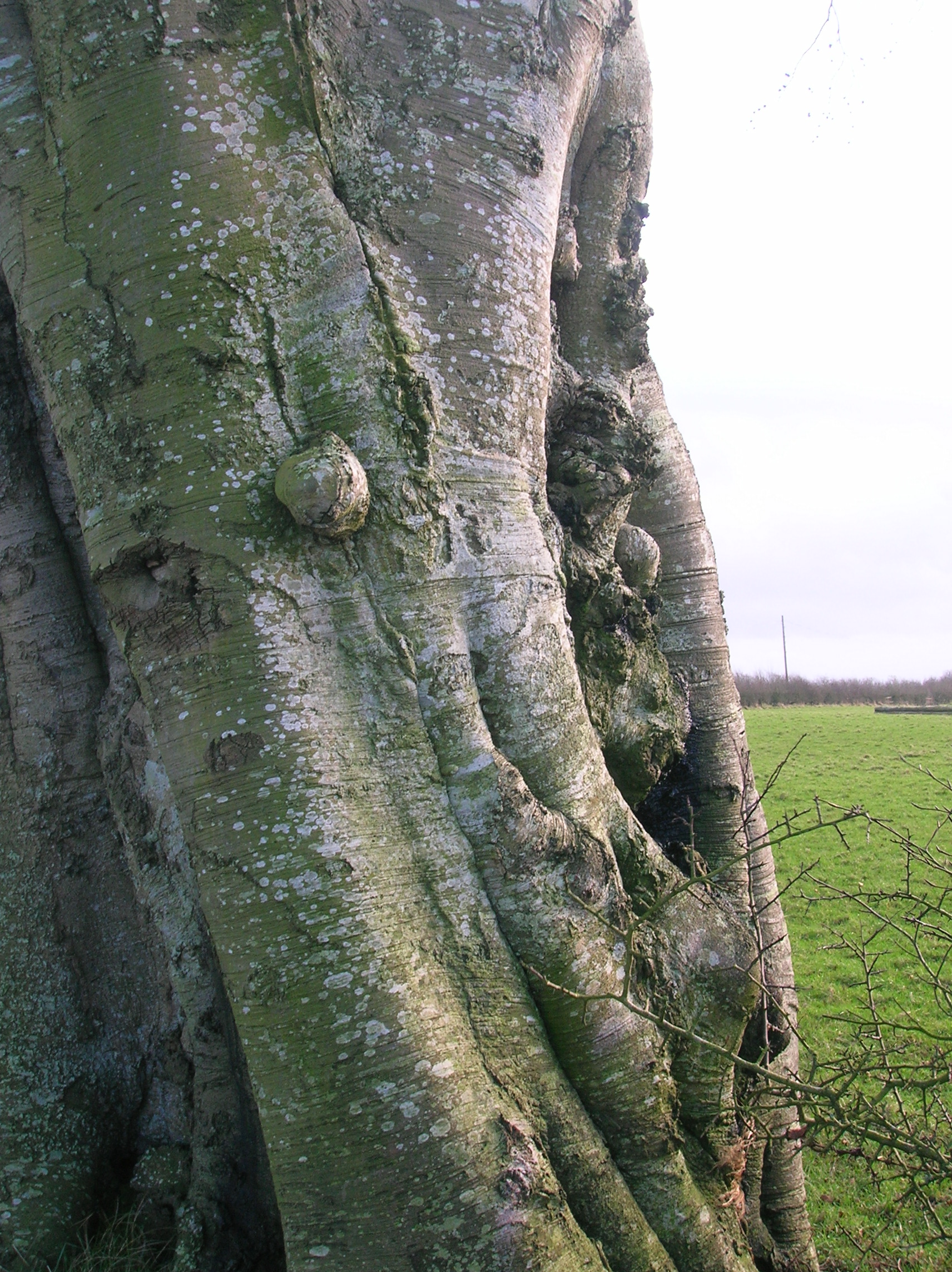
Canker on a beech tree

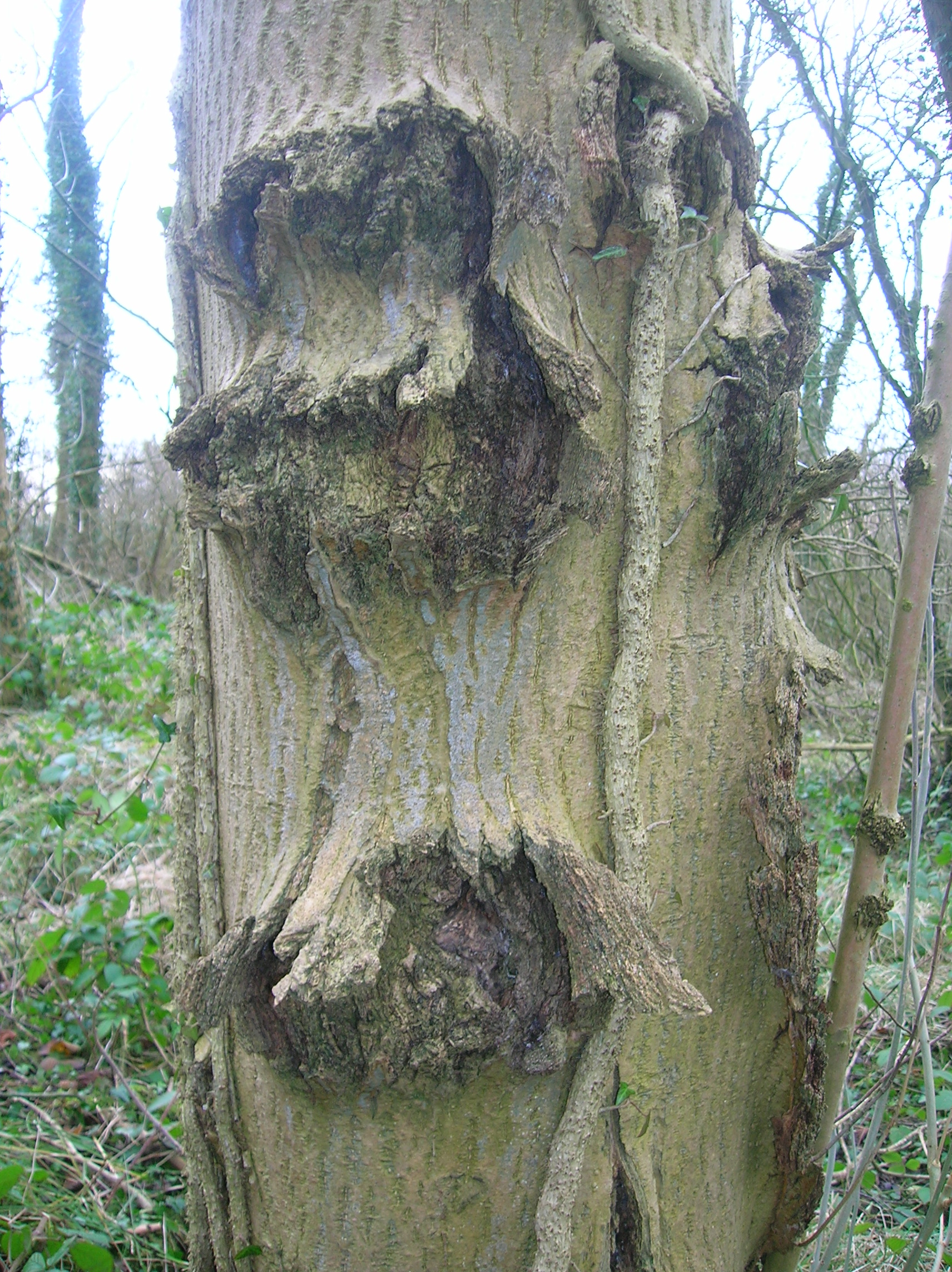
Canker on an ash tree in North Ayrshire, Scotland

== See also ==
- Forest pathology
- Burl or Burr
