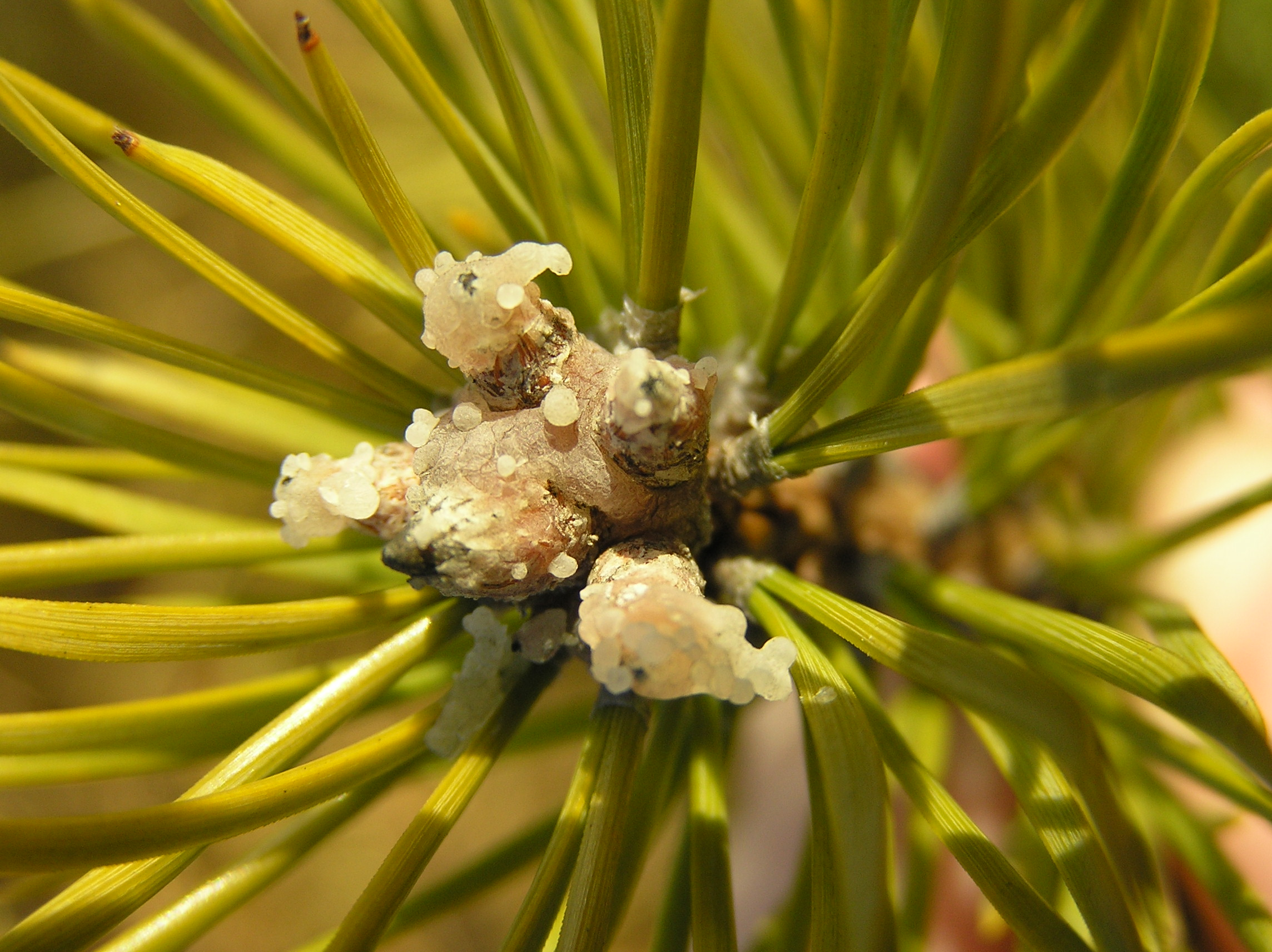
- Gremmeniella abietina

Scientific classification
- Domain: Eukaryota
- Kingdom: Fungi
- Division: Ascomycota
- Class: Leotiomycetes
- Order: Helotiales
- Family: Helotiaceae
- Genus: Gremmeniella
- Species: G. abietina

Binomial name
- Gremmeniella abietina (Lagerberg) Morelet

Synonyms
- Ascocalyx abietina (Lagerberg); Scleroderris lagerbergii (Lagerberg); Lagerbergia abietina

= Scleroderris canker =

Species of fungus

Scleroderris canker (American name), or Brunchorstia disease (European name), Gremmeniella abietina, is a species of fungal diseases infecting coniferous forests. The main symptom is the death of the needles, leading to the death of the tree. In the forest industry, fighting off an infection of Scleroderris canker is usually not cost-effective. Clearing is often preferred over fungicidal methods, as the latter is harmful to other living organisms.

== Geographical distribution ==
The European strain is present throughout all of Europe, including the European part of Russia. The American strain limits itself to north of 44°N.

== Cause and symptoms ==
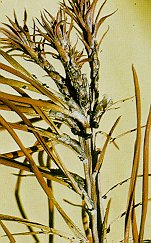
Needles of a conifer infected with Scleroderris canker

There are two strains of the fungus in existence, the North American and European. The latter is more virulent, capable of infecting an entire tree and killing it over a few years time, whereas the North American strain limits itself to the first few metres of the stem. Another reason behind the high potency of the European strain is that trees are unable to defend themselves from the fungus during winters, as the fungus can remain active at temperatures as low as -5°C

Early signs of a Scleroderris canker infection includes a purple tint in the needles and, more evidently, the falling off the needles in the wrong season. A severe Scleroderris canker infection can sometimes be disastrous, as the fungus survives on the pine cones, killing any new seedlings within two years.

Chances of infection increase greatly if the previous winter has been mild and the spring season is cool and wet, due to the active temperature. Infection occurs in damaged buds and proceeds downwards into the stem, and ascospores are released from November to July.

== Control ==
=== Chemical ===
The fungicide Chlorothalonil can be used to ward off the disease in nurseries. However, it is ineffective in adult populations.

=== Resistance ===
Resistant species of Jack pine have been observed in Ontario.

=== Regulatory ===
It has been found that the European strain can spread via the import of Christmas trees. Regulating such imports can limit the spread of the disease.

== Main host genera ==
- Abies
- Picea
- Pinus

== Synonyms ==
- Lagerbergia abietina (Lagerberg)
- Ascocalyx abietina (Lagerberg)
- Scleroderris abietina (Lagerberg)
- Scleroderris lagerbergii
