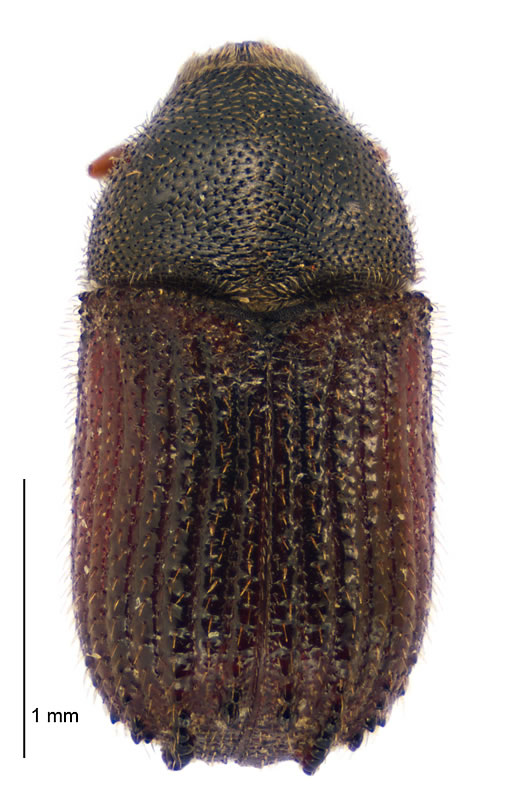
- Phloeosinus cupressi

Scientific classification
- Domain: Eukaryota
- Kingdom: Animalia
- Phylum: Arthropoda
- Class: Insecta
- Order: Coleoptera
- Suborder: Polyphaga
- Infraorder: Cucujiformia
- Family: Curculionidae
- Subfamily: Scolytinae
- Genus: Phloeosinus; Chapuis, 1869

= Phloeosinus =

Genus of beetles

Phloeosinus is a genus of cedar bark beetles in the family Curculionidae. There are at least 20 described species in Phloeosinus.

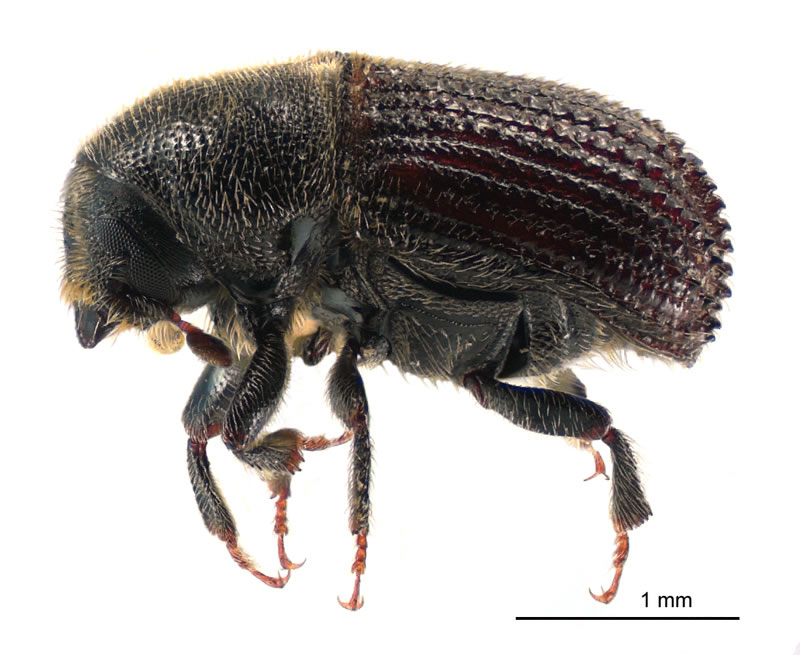
Phloeosinus cupressi

== Species ==
- Phloeosinus antennatus Swaine, 1924
- Phloeosinus arizonicus Blackman, 1942
- Phloeosinus armatus Reitter, 1887b
- Phloeosinus aubei Perris, 1855
- Phloeosinus baumanni Hopkins, 1905
- Phloeosinus canadensis Swaine, 1917 (northern cedar bark beetle)
- Phloeosinus cristatus (LeConte, 1868)
- Phloeosinus cupressi Hopkins, 1903 (cypress bark beetle)
- Phloeosinus dentatus (Say, 1826)
- Phloeosinus frontalis Bruck, 1933
- Phloeosinus fulgens Swaine, 1924
- Phloeosinus furnissi Blackman, 1942
- Phloeosinus hoferi Blackman, 1942
- Phloeosinus hoppingi Swaine, 1915
- Phloeosinus keeni Blackman, 1942
- Phloeosinus pini Swaine, 1915
- Phloeosinus punctatus LeConte, 1876 (western cedar bark beetle)
- Phloeosinus scopulorum Swaine, 1924
- Phloeosinus sequoiae Hopkins, 1903
- Phloeosinus serratus (LeConte, 1868) (juniper bark beetle)
- Phloeosinus setosus Bruck, 1933
- Phloeosinus spinosus Blackman, 1942
- Phloeosinus swainei Bruck, 1933
- Phloeosinus taxodii Blackman, 1922
- Phloeosinus vandykei Swaine, 1915
- Phloeosinus variolatus Bruck, 1931
