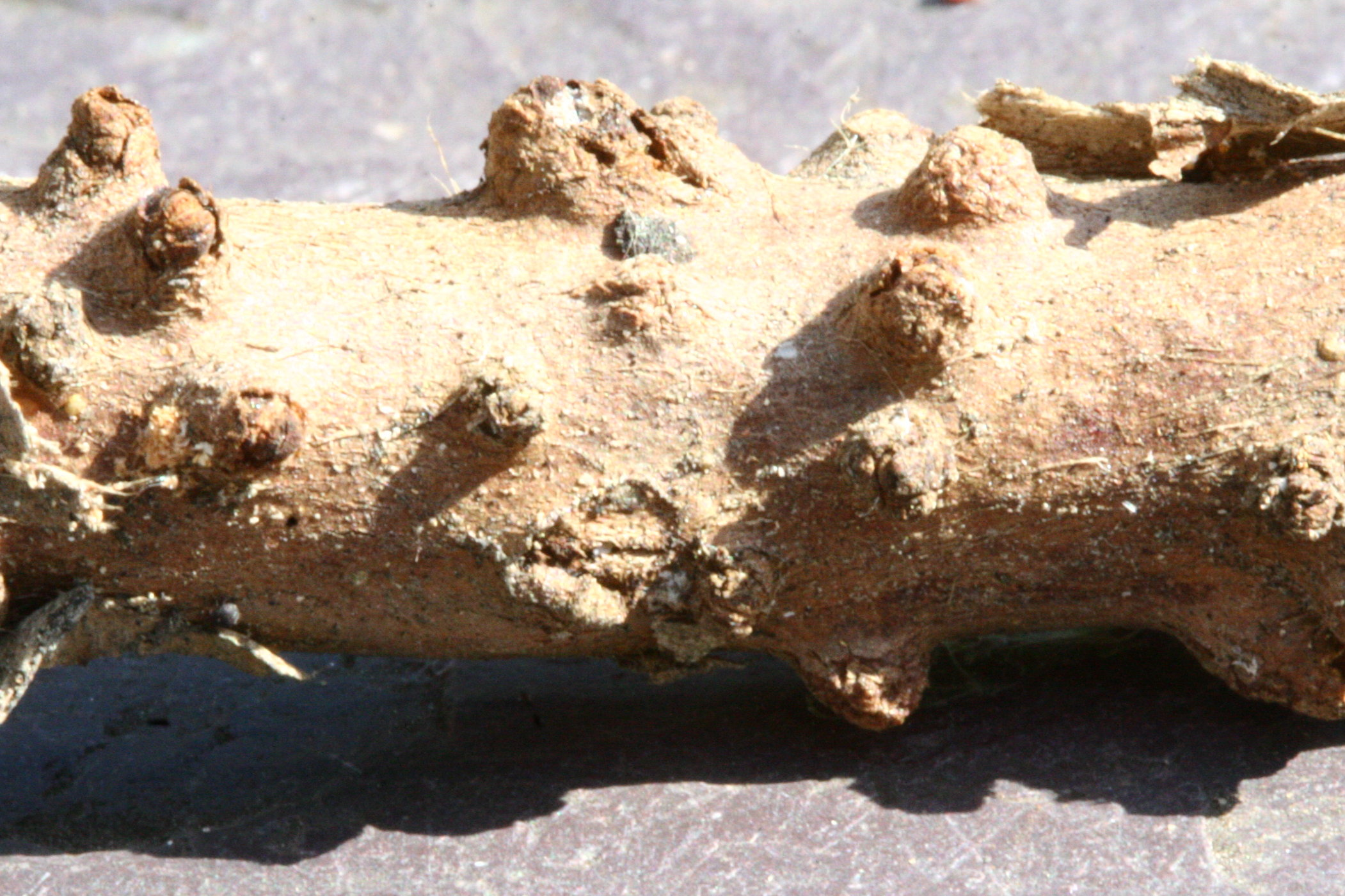
- Asexual fructifications of Cypress canker disease

Scientific classification
- Kingdom: Fungi
- Division: Ascomycota
- Class: Sordariomycetes
- Order: Amphisphaeriales
- Family: Sporocadaceae
- Genus: Seiridium; Nees (1816)

Type species
- Seiridium marginatum Nees (1817)

= Seiridium =

Genus of fungi

Seiridium is a genus of plant pathogens in the family Sporocadaceae.

Seiridium cardinale is important to gardeners and foresters as they cause the devastating Cypress canker disease on Cupressus, Thuja, and related conifers in Northern Europe, America, Australia, and New Zealand. Seiridium cardinale is from California and was introduced to Europe around the 1930s, probably from infected nursery stock. A separate introduction affected the southern hemisphere.

== Species ==
As accepted by Species Fungorum;

- Seiridium abietinum (Ellis & Everh.) B. Sutton (1975)
- Seiridium anceps (Sacc.) B. Sutton (1975)
- Seiridium aquaticum Z.L. Luo, K.D. Hyde & H.Y. Su (2019)
- Seiridium bignoniae (Sousa da Câmara) B. Sutton (1975)
- Seiridium breviaristatum (Tracy & Earle) B. Sutton (1975)
- Seiridium caffrum Matsush. (1996)
- Seiridium camelliae Maharachch. & K.D. Hyde (2015)
- Seiridium canariense (Petr.) Nag Raj & W.B. Kendr. (1986)
- Seiridium cancrinum G. Bonthond, M. Sand.-Den. & P.W. Crous (2017)
- Seiridium cardinale (W.W. Wagener) B. Sutton & I.A.S. Gibson (1972)
- Seiridium castaneae (Berk. & M.A. Curtis ex Sacc.) B. Sutton (1975)
- Seiridium ceratosporum (De Not.) Nag Raj (1993)
- Seiridium chinense C.M. Tian & N. Jiang (2019)
- Seiridium corni (Allesch.) B. Sutton (1970)
- Seiridium cupressi (Nattrass, C. Booth & B. Sutton) Bonthond, Sand.-Den. & Crous (2019)
- Seiridium delleanii (Servazzi) B. Sutton (1963)
- Seiridium embeliae Rashmi Dubey & Akh.K. Pandey (2009)
- Seiridium eriobotryae Y.X. Chen & G. Wei (2002)
- Seiridium eucalypti Nag Raj (1993)
- Seiridium indicum Pavgi & U.P. Singh (1971)
- Seiridium intermedium (Sacc.) B. Sutton (1975)
- Seiridium italicum Samarak., Camporesi & K.D. Hyde (2022)
- Seiridium jefferisii (Ellis) Nag Raj (1993)
- Seiridium kartense G. Bonthond, M. Sand.-Den. & P.W. Crous (2017)
- Seiridium kenyanum G. Bonthond, M. Sand.-Den. & P.W. Crous (2017)
- Seiridium mali (Ellis & Everh.) Nag Raj (1993)
- Seiridium marginatum Nees (1816)
- Seiridium neocupressi G. Bonthond, M. Sand.-Den. & P.W. Crous (2017)
- Seiridium papillatum Z.Q. Yuan (1997)
- Seiridium persooniae Crous (2017)
- Seiridium pezizoides (De Not.) Crous (2019)
- Seiridium phylicae Crous & M.J. Wingf. (2012)
- Seiridium podocarpi Crous & A.R. Wood (2014)
- Seiridium proteae Marinc., M.J. Wingf. & Crous (2008)
- Seiridium pseudocardinale Wijayaw., Camporesi, McKenzie & K.D. Hyde (2016)
- Seiridium rosarum Wanas., Camporesi, E.B.G. Jones & K.D. Hyde (2018)
- Seiridium rostratum (Zabriskie) Nag Raj (1993)
- Seiridium spyridiicola G. Bonthond, M. Sand.-Den. & P.W. Crous (2017)
- Seiridium syzygii Crous (2021)
- Seiridium tecomae (Sacc.) B. Sutton (1975)
- Seiridium terebinthi (Briosi) Nag Raj (1993)
- Seiridium turgidum (G.F. Atk.) Nag Raj (1993)
- Seiridium venetum (Sacc.) Nag Raj (1989)
- Seiridium viburni (Sousa da Câmara & Luz) B. Sutton (1963)

Former species;

- S. acerinum (Bäumler) B. Sutton (1975) = Sporocadus acerinus, Sporocadaceae
- S. banksiae Crous & Summerell (2011) = Distononappendiculata banksiae, Sporocadaceae
- S. juniperi (Allesch.) B. Sutton (1975) = Pestalotia juniperi, Pestalotiopsidaceae
- S. liquidambaris Berk. & M.A. Curtis (1874) = Harknessia liquidambaris, Harknessiaceae
- S. unicorne (Cooke & Ellis) B. Sutton (1975) = Seiridium cupressi
