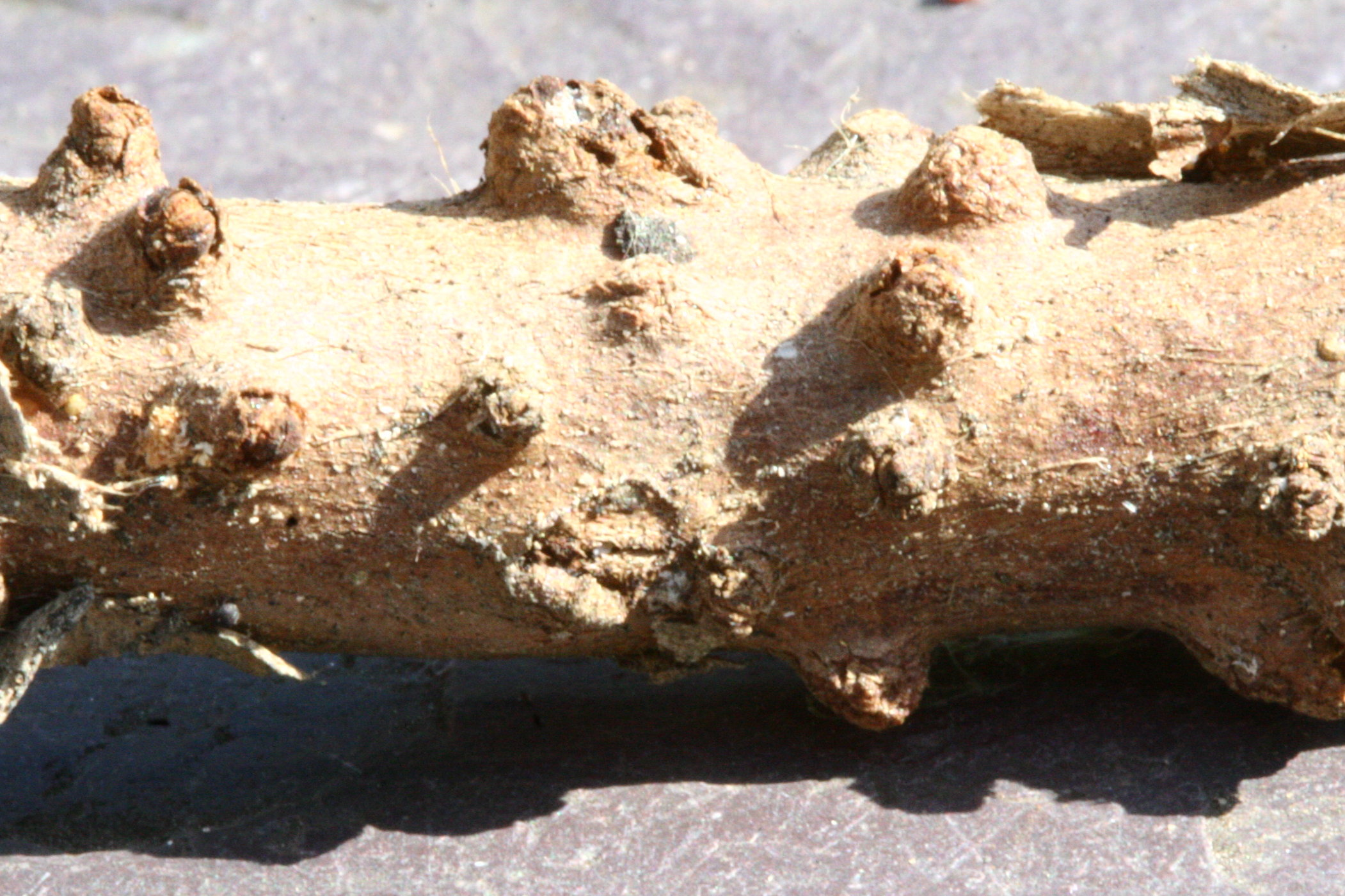
- Asexual fructifications (acervular connidiomata) of Cypress canker disease on a twig of Thuja plicata. The fungus is probably Seiridium cardinale.

Scientific classification
- Kingdom: Fungi
- Division: Ascomycota
- Class: Sordariomycetes
- Order: Amphisphaeriales
- Family: Sporocadaceae
- Genus: Seiridium
- Species: S. cardinale

Binomial name
- Seiridium cardinale (W.W. Wagener) B. Sutton & I.A.S. Gibson

Synonyms
- Coryneum cardinale WW Wagener 1939

= Seiridium cardinale =

Species of fungus

Seiridium cardinale is a species of fungus within the genus of Seiridium, in the Sporocadaceae family.

It is the primary cause of Cypress canker, a fungal disease that affects various species of trees in the genus Cupressus, including Cupressus sempervirens, the Provence cypress. This disease leads to the decline of infected trees and has led to the destruction of millions in central Italy in particular. It causes branch and trunk cankers. In 2009, it was found in Morocco on Cupressus sempervirens trees.
