= A. glutinosa =

A. glutinosa may refer to:

- Alnus glutinosa, the black alder, European alder or common alder, a tree species native to most of Europe
- Arctostaphylos glutinosa, the Schreiber's manzanita, a plant species endemic to Santa Cruz County, California
- Aristeguietia glutinosa, the matico, a flowering plant species found only in Ecuador

== See also ==
- Glutinosa
