= Antaeotricha manzanitae =

Scientific classification
- Domain: Eukaryota
- Kingdom: Animalia
- Phylum: Arthropoda
- Class: Insecta
- Order: Lepidoptera
- Family: Depressariidae
- Genus: Antaeotricha
- Species: A. manzanitae

Binomial name
- Antaeotricha manzanitae Keifer, 1937

Species of moth

Antaeotricha manzanitae is a moth in the family Depressariidae. It was described by Hartford Hammond Keifer in 1937. It is found in North America, where it has been recorded from California, Oregon and British Columbia.

The wingspan is 25–30 mm. The forewings are white, irregularly shaded with fuscous scales and with two patches of dark scales at the anal angle. The apical margin has a row of faint, transverse fuscous dots. The hindwings are light fuscous.

The larvae feed on Arctostaphylos species.
