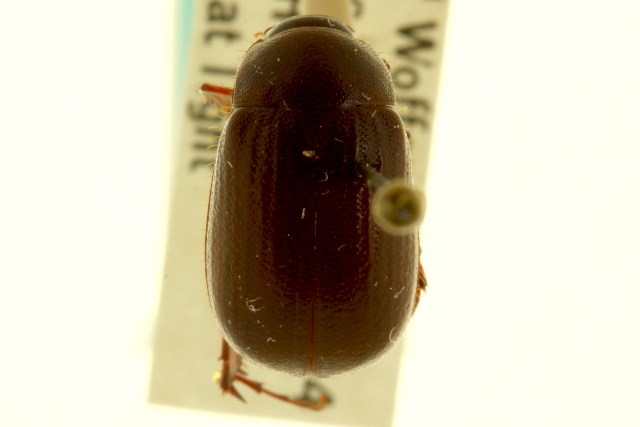

Scientific classification
- Kingdom: Animalia
- Phylum: Arthropoda
- Class: Insecta
- Order: Coleoptera
- Suborder: Polyphaga
- Infraorder: Scarabaeiformia
- Family: Scarabaeidae
- Genus: Serica
- Species: S. alleni

Binomial name
- Serica alleni Saylor, 1939

Synonyms
- Serica searli Saylor, 1939

= Serica alleni =

Species of beetle

Serica alleni is a species of beetle of the family Scarabaeidae. It is found in the United States (California).

== Description ==
Adults reach a length of about 8–9.5 mm. The colour is piceous to piceo-castaneous. The surface is moderately shining, and mostly glabrous above, except for a few short elytral hairs.

== Life history ==
Recorded host plants for the adults are the foliage of Quercus kelloggi, as well as Arctostaphylos pringlei and the needles of Abies concolor.
