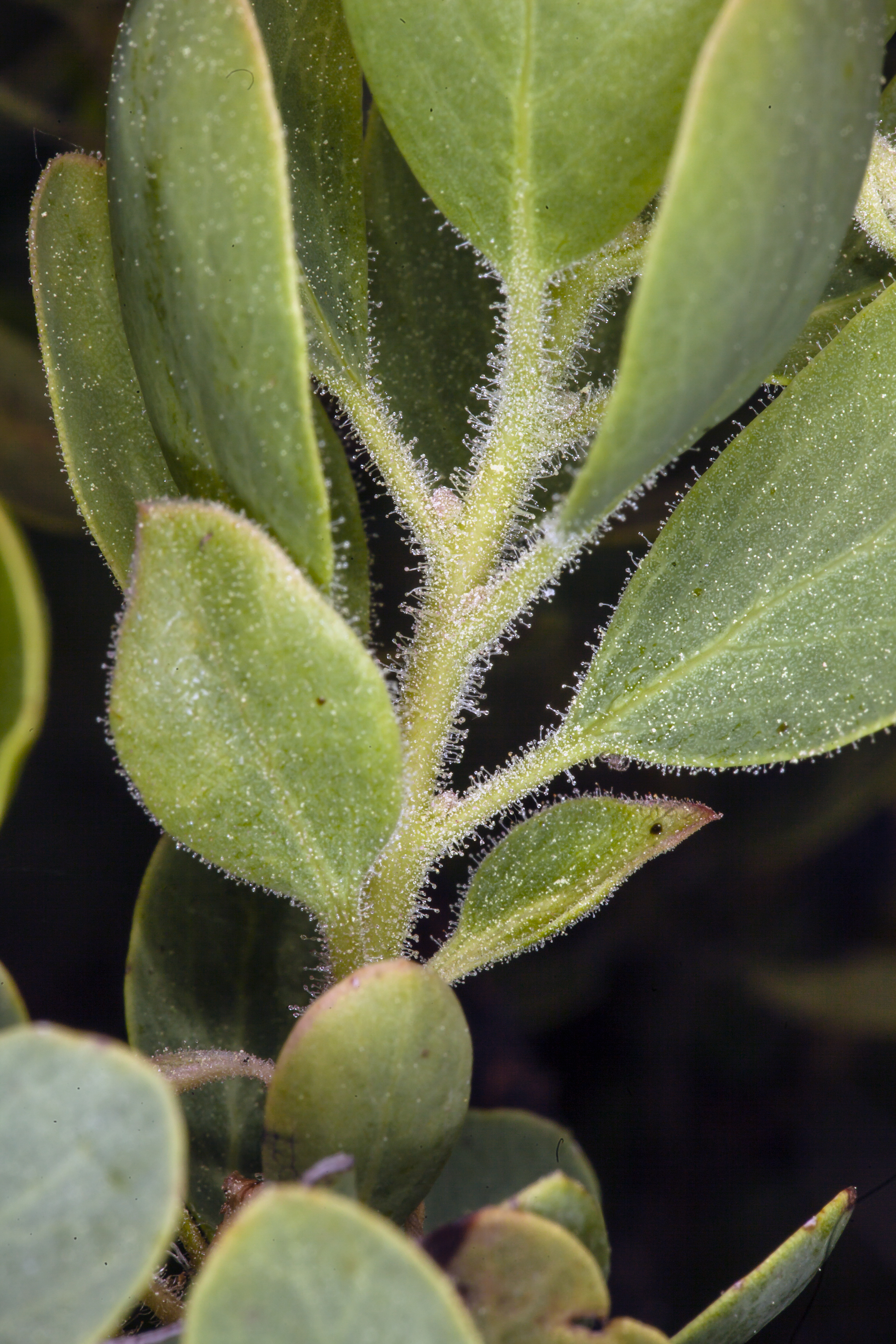

Conservation status
- Imperiled (NatureServe)

Scientific classification
- Kingdom: Plantae
- Clade: Tracheophytes
- Clade: Angiosperms
- Clade: Eudicots
- Clade: Asterids
- Order: Ericales
- Family: Ericaceae
- Genus: Arctostaphylos
- Species: A. klamathensis

Binomial name
- Arctostaphylos klamathensis S.W.Edwards, Keeler-Wolf & W.Knight

= Arctostaphylos klamathensis =

Species of flowering plant

Arctostaphylos klamathensis, with the common name Klamath manzanita, is a species of manzanita. It is endemic to the Klamath Mountains of far northern California, where it was first described during an ecological survey in Cedar Basin near the border between Siskiyou and Trinity Counties in 1982.

== Description ==
The Arctostaphylos klamathensis is a low-lying, matted shrub forming tangles and mounds no taller than one half meter. Its foliage and twigs are coated with glandular bristles. The leaves are dull, rough, and up to 3.5 centimeters long. The inflorescence is a rounded cluster of manzanita flowers, and it bears spherical drupes with seeds fused into a single hard body.

== Habitat ==
Arctostaphylos klamathensis is a resident of open areas in the forest and the local mountain chaparral plant community, where it is the dominant shrub in some spots.
