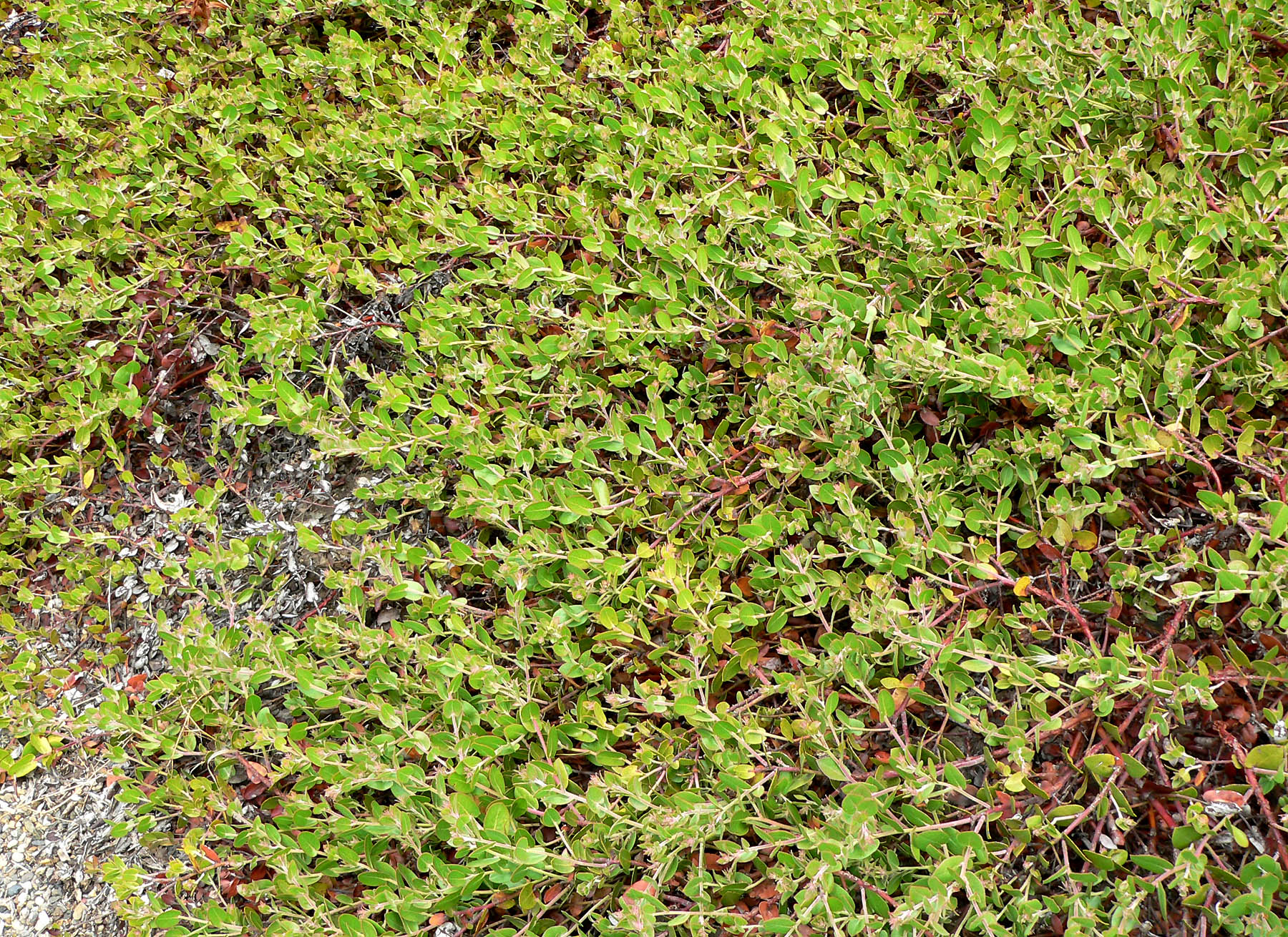

Conservation status
- Critically Imperiled (NatureServe)

Scientific classification
- Kingdom: Plantae
- Clade: Tracheophytes
- Clade: Angiosperms
- Clade: Eudicots
- Clade: Asterids
- Order: Ericales
- Family: Ericaceae
- Genus: Arctostaphylos
- Species: A. cruzensis

Binomial name
- Arctostaphylos cruzensis J.B.Roof

= Arctostaphylos cruzensis =

Species of flowering plant

Arctostaphylos cruzensis is a species of manzanita known by the common names La Cruz manzanita and Arroyo de la Cruz manzanita.

This shrub is endemic to California, where it grows in the sand of the coastline in Monterey and San Luis Obispo Counties.

== Description ==
Arctostaphylos cruzensis is a very petite manzanita which grows flat on the ground or shaped into a low mound. The stem is covered in red shreddy bark.

The small, pointed oval leaves are bright green and sometimes slightly toothed or with a fringe of hairs along the reddish edges.

The flowers are very pale pink and urn-shaped with tapered throats. The fruits are hairy drupes up to a centimeter in diameter and containing angular seeds.
