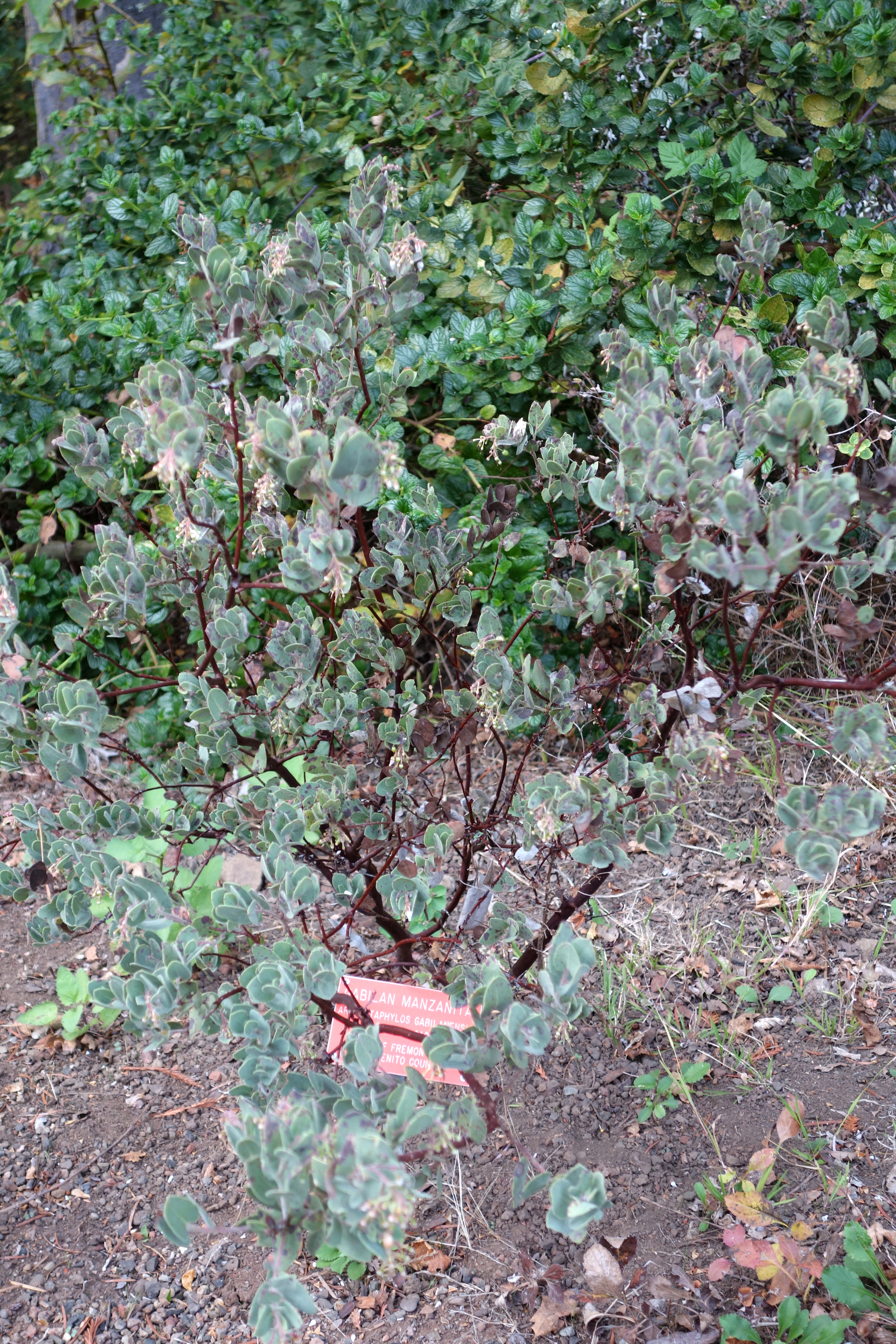

Conservation status
- Critically Imperiled (NatureServe)

Scientific classification
- Kingdom: Plantae
- Clade: Embryophytes
- Clade: Tracheophytes
- Clade: Angiosperms
- Clade: Eudicots
- Clade: Asterids
- Order: Ericales
- Family: Ericaceae
- Genus: Arctostaphylos
- Species: A. gabilanensis

Binomial name
- Arctostaphylos gabilanensis V.T.Parker & M.C.Vasey

= Arctostaphylos gabilanensis =

Species of tree

Arctostaphylos gabilanensis is a rare species of manzanita known by the common name Gabilan manzanita.

== Distribution ==
It is endemic to California, where it is known only from two disjunct populations in the Gabilan Range on the border between Monterey and San Benito Counties. It was described to science in 2004 from the type specimen collected near Fremont Peak in 2002.

The plant can be found in chaparral habitat. The plant is considered vulnerable because it is rare, with one population containing about 30 individuals and the other spanning about 1000 hectares but widely spaced.

== Description ==
Arctostaphylos gabilanensis is an erect shrub reaching a bushlike one meter to a treelike five meters in height. It is coated in medium or dark red bark, the small twigs with fuzzy hairs.

The waxy gray-green leaves are up to 3.5 centimeters long by 2.4 wide. The blades are oval and auriculate (with an earlobe-shaped lobe on either side of the petiole).

The inflorescence is a panicle of white or pink conical or urn-shaped flowers each 6 to 8 centimeters long. The fruit is a spherical reddish-brown drupe 1 to 1.5 centimeters wide.
