= Arctostaphylos malloryi =

Conservation status
- Vulnerable (NatureServe)

Scientific classification
- Kingdom: Plantae
- Clade: Tracheophytes
- Clade: Angiosperms
- Clade: Eudicots
- Clade: Asterids
- Order: Ericales
- Family: Ericaceae
- Genus: Arctostaphylos
- Species: A. malloryi

Binomial name
- Arctostaphylos malloryi (W. Knight & Gankin) P.V. Wells

Species of flowering plant

Arctostaphylos malloryi is a species of manzanita known by the common name Mallory's manzanita. It is endemic to California.

The plant is native to the Inner North Coast Ranges west and northwest of the Sacramento Valley. It is a resident of the chaparral plant community, often on volcanic soils.

== Description ==
Arctostaphylos malloryi is a short erect shrub which may exceed one meter in height. Its branches are woolly, glandular, and bristly. The leaves may be woolly to waxy and nearly hairless. They are rounded to oval in shape and 2 to 3 centimeters long.

The bristly inflorescence is a cluster of urn-shaped manzanita flowers which are hairy inside. The fruit is a drupe just under a centimeter wide which is hairy when new and becomes hairless as it ripens.
