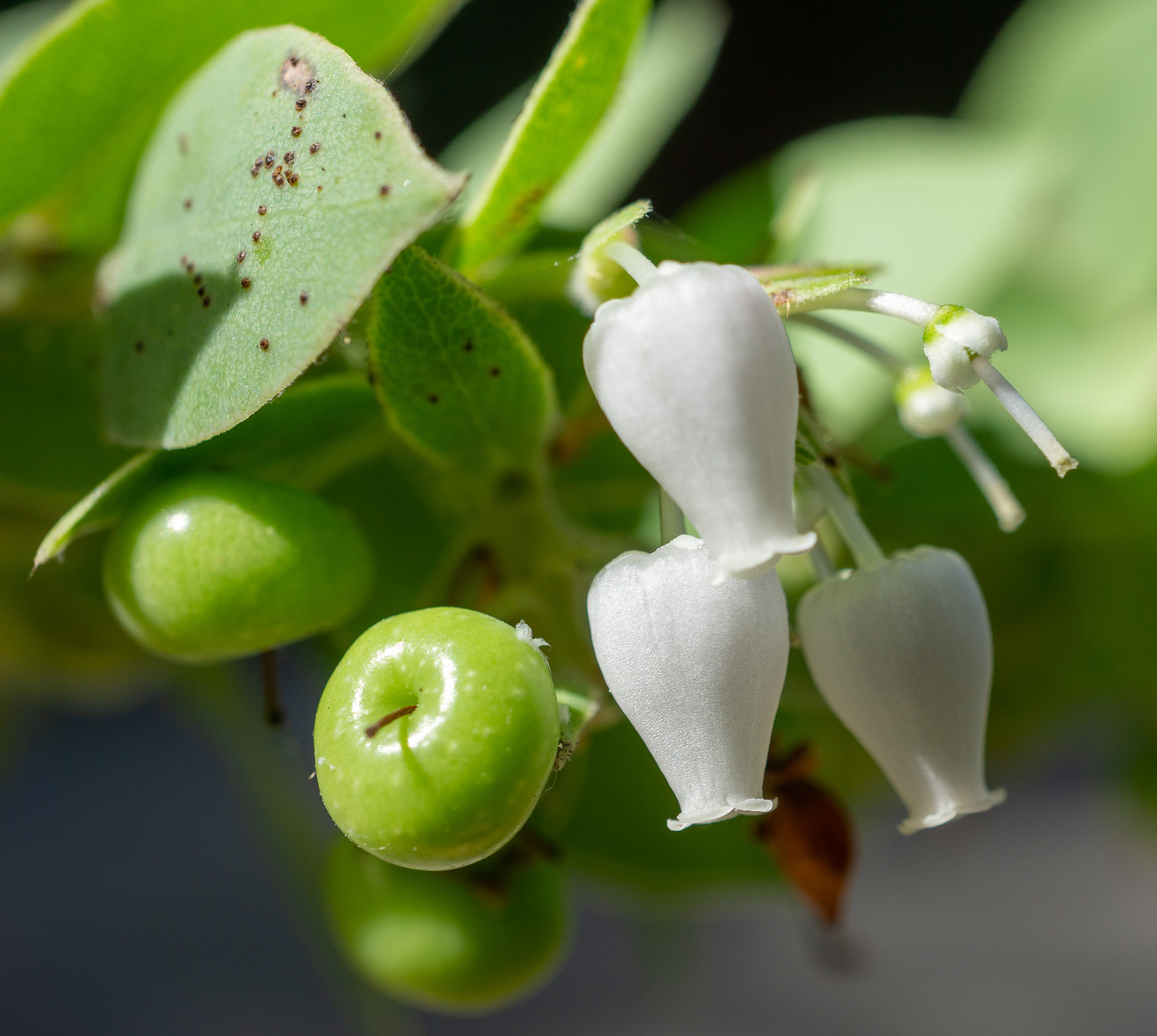

Conservation status
- Imperiled (NatureServe)

Scientific classification
- Kingdom: Plantae
- Clade: Tracheophytes
- Clade: Angiosperms
- Clade: Eudicots
- Clade: Asterids
- Order: Ericales
- Family: Ericaceae
- Genus: Arctostaphylos
- Species: A. pechoensis

Binomial name
- Arctostaphylos pechoensis (Dudley ex Abrams) Dudley ex Munz

= Arctostaphylos pechoensis =

Species of flowering plant

Arctostaphylos pechoensis is a species of manzanita known by the common name Pecho manzanita. It is endemic to California, where it is known only from the Pecho Hills southwest of San Luis Obispo in San Luis Obispo County, California.

It is a plant of the chaparral and coastal coniferous forest.

== Description ==
This is a large shrub, generally growing at least 2 meters tall and known to exceed five meters in height. Its smaller branches are woolly with long white bristles. The dense foliage of leaves are oval-shaped, smooth, toothed, or jagged along the edges, and overlapping. The inflorescence is a cluster of cone-shaped manzanita flowers, each about 7 millimeters long. The fruit is a hairless or nearly hairless red drupe about a centimeter wide.
