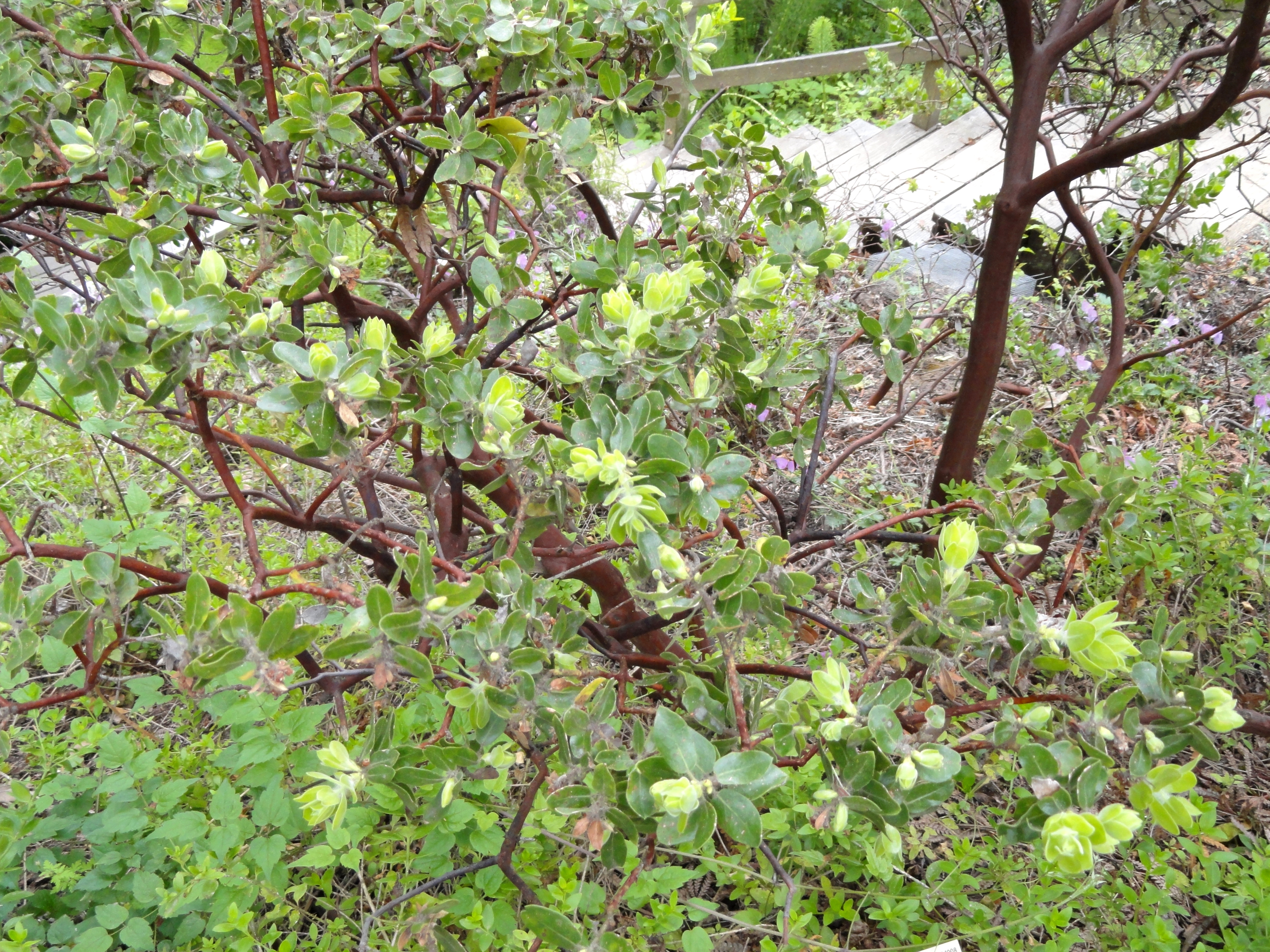

Conservation status
- Apparently Secure (NatureServe)

Scientific classification
- Kingdom: Plantae
- Clade: Tracheophytes
- Clade: Angiosperms
- Clade: Eudicots
- Clade: Asterids
- Order: Ericales
- Family: Ericaceae
- Genus: Arctostaphylos
- Species: A. viridissima

Binomial name
- Arctostaphylos viridissima (Eastw.) McMinn

= Arctostaphylos viridissima =

Species of tree

Arctostaphylos viridissima is a species of manzanita known by the common names whitehair manzanita and McMinn's manzanita. It is endemic to Santa Cruz Island, one of the Channel Islands of California.

== Description ==
Arctostaphylos viridissima is a shrub varying in shape and size. It may be a matted bush one metre (~3 ft) tall to a spreading treelike form over 4 metres (~12 ft) in height. Its stem and branches are covered in peeling red bark and its smaller twigs are woolly and bear long white bristles. The leaves are oval in shape, fuzzy when new and green and shiny when mature, reaching 3.5 cm.

The inflorescence is a dense cluster of urn-shaped manzanita flowers. The fruit is a fuzzy drupe just over a centimeter wide.
