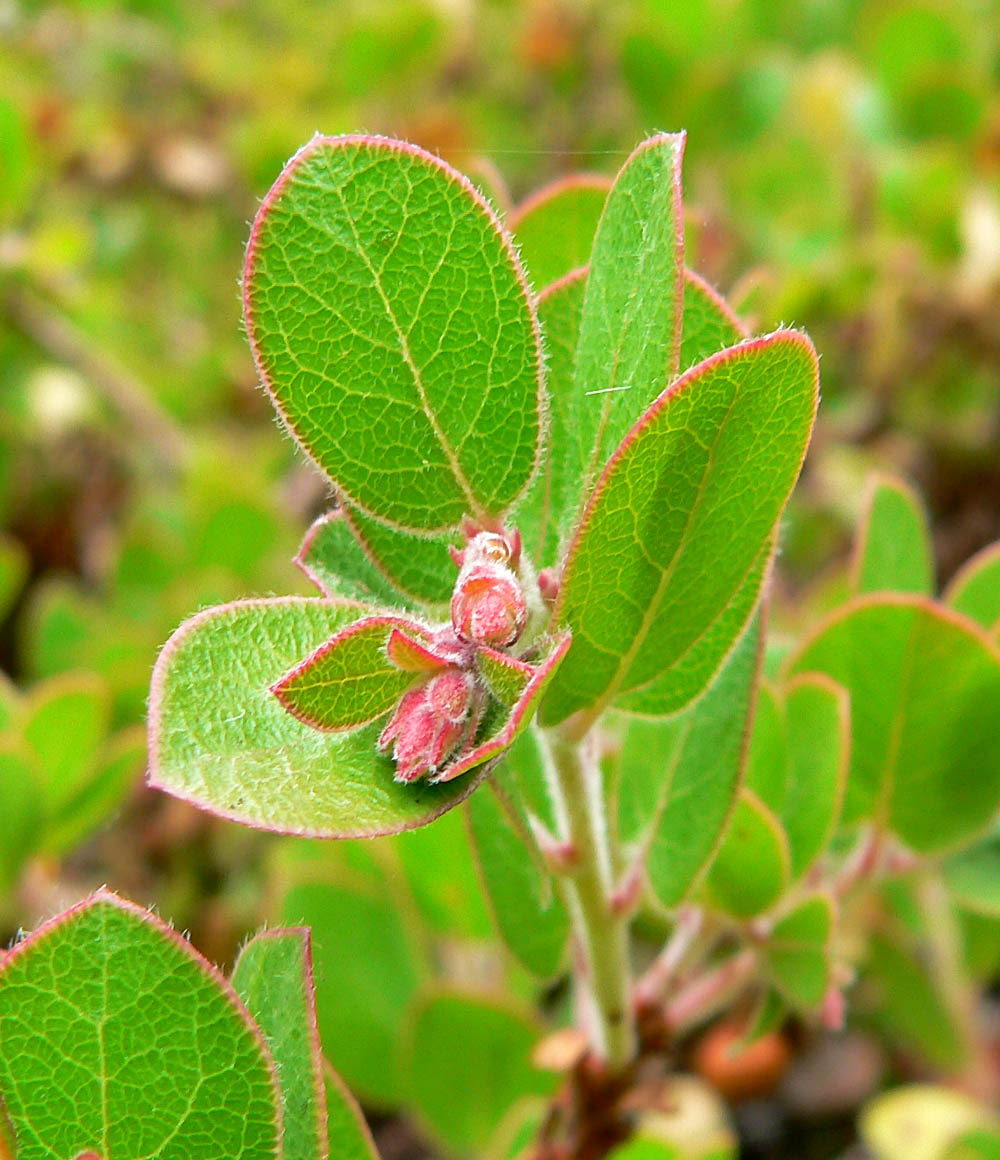

Conservation status
- Imperiled (NatureServe)

Scientific classification
- Kingdom: Plantae
- Clade: Tracheophytes
- Clade: Angiosperms
- Clade: Eudicots
- Clade: Asterids
- Order: Ericales
- Family: Ericaceae
- Genus: Arctostaphylos
- Species: A. edmundsii

Binomial name
- Arctostaphylos edmundsii J.T.Howell

Synonyms
- Arctostaphylos edmundsii var. parvifolia J.B. Roof; Arctostaphylos uva-ursi ssp. emundsii (J.T. Howell) J.B. Roof; Arctostaphylos uva-ursi var. parvifolia (J.B. Roof) J.B. Roof

= Arctostaphylos edmundsii =

Species of flowering plant

Arctostaphylos edmundsii, with the common name Little Sur manzanita, is a species of manzanita. This shrub is endemic to California where it grows on the coastal bluffs of Monterey County.

== Description ==
This is a petite, low-lying manzanita which forms mounds and patchy mats in sandy soil. The leathery leaves are small and rounded to oval, dark green and shiny when mature and red-edged when new. The inflorescences are dense with flowers, which are small, urn-shaped to rounded, and waxy white to very pale pink. The fruit is a shiny, reddish-brown drupe between one half and one centimeter wide. It is a perennial shrub.

== See also ==
- California chaparral and woodlands - (ecoregion)
- California coastal sage and chaparral - (sub-ecoregion)
