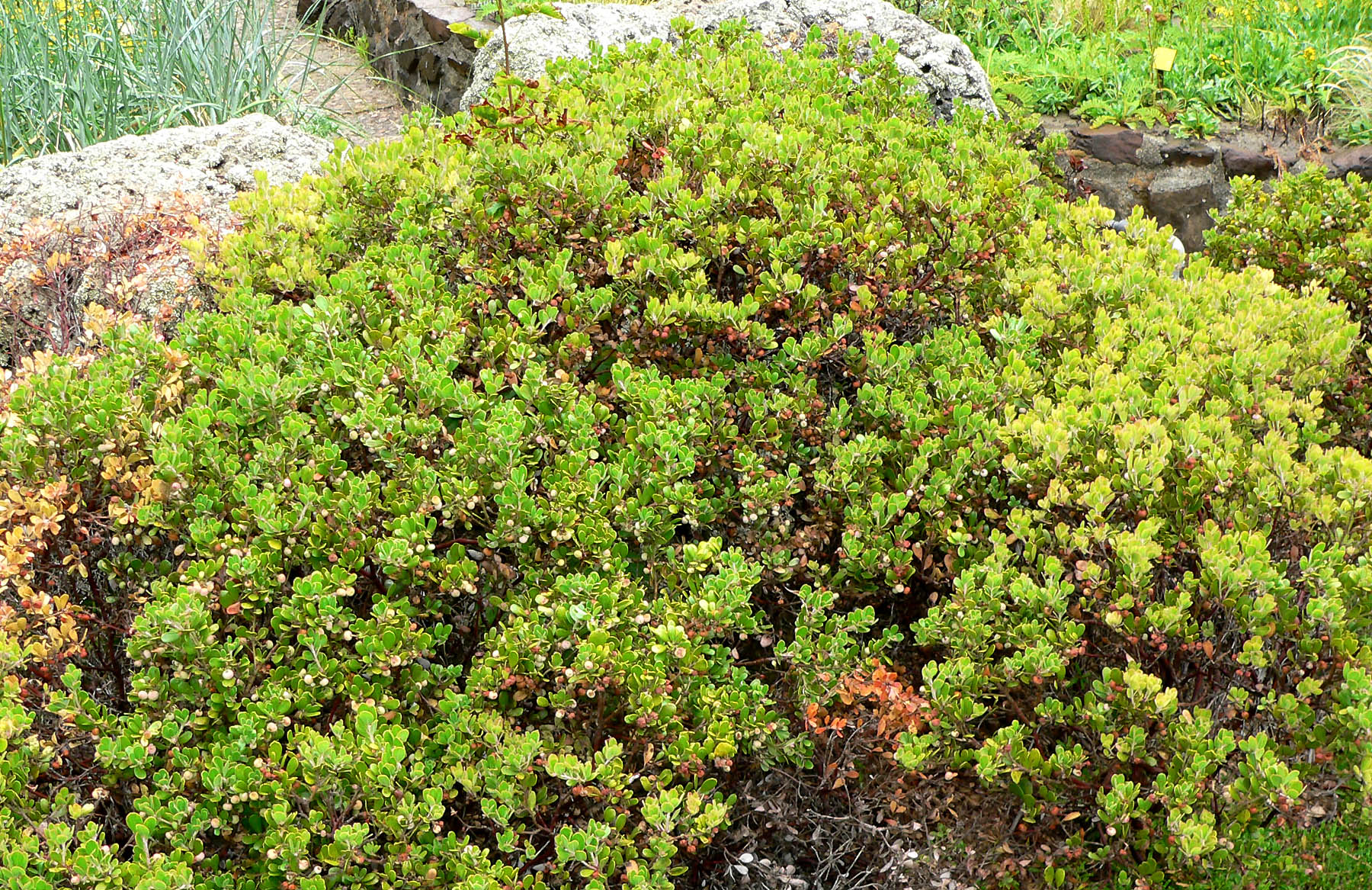

Conservation status
- Critically Imperiled (NatureServe)

Scientific classification
- Kingdom: Plantae
- Clade: Tracheophytes
- Clade: Angiosperms
- Clade: Eudicots
- Clade: Asterids
- Order: Ericales
- Family: Ericaceae
- Genus: Arctostaphylos
- Species: A. pumila

Binomial name
- Arctostaphylos pumila Nutt.

= Arctostaphylos pumila =

Species of flowering plant

Arctostaphylos pumila, with the common name sandmat manzanita, is a species of manzanita.

== Description ==
Arctostaphylos pumila is a petite, low-lying manzanita which forms flat bushes and patchy, creeping mats in sandy soil. The bark is reddish and tends not to shred. The leaves are small and mainly oval-shaped, dark green on the upper surface and grayish and fuzzy beneath. The flowers appear in sparse inflorescences and are white to very pale pink. The fruit is a round brownish drupe about half a centimeter wide.

== Distribution ==
The Arctostaphylos pumila shrub is endemic to California where it grows on the coastline near Monterey and the Monterey Bay.

== See also ==
- California coastal sage and chaparral ecoregion
