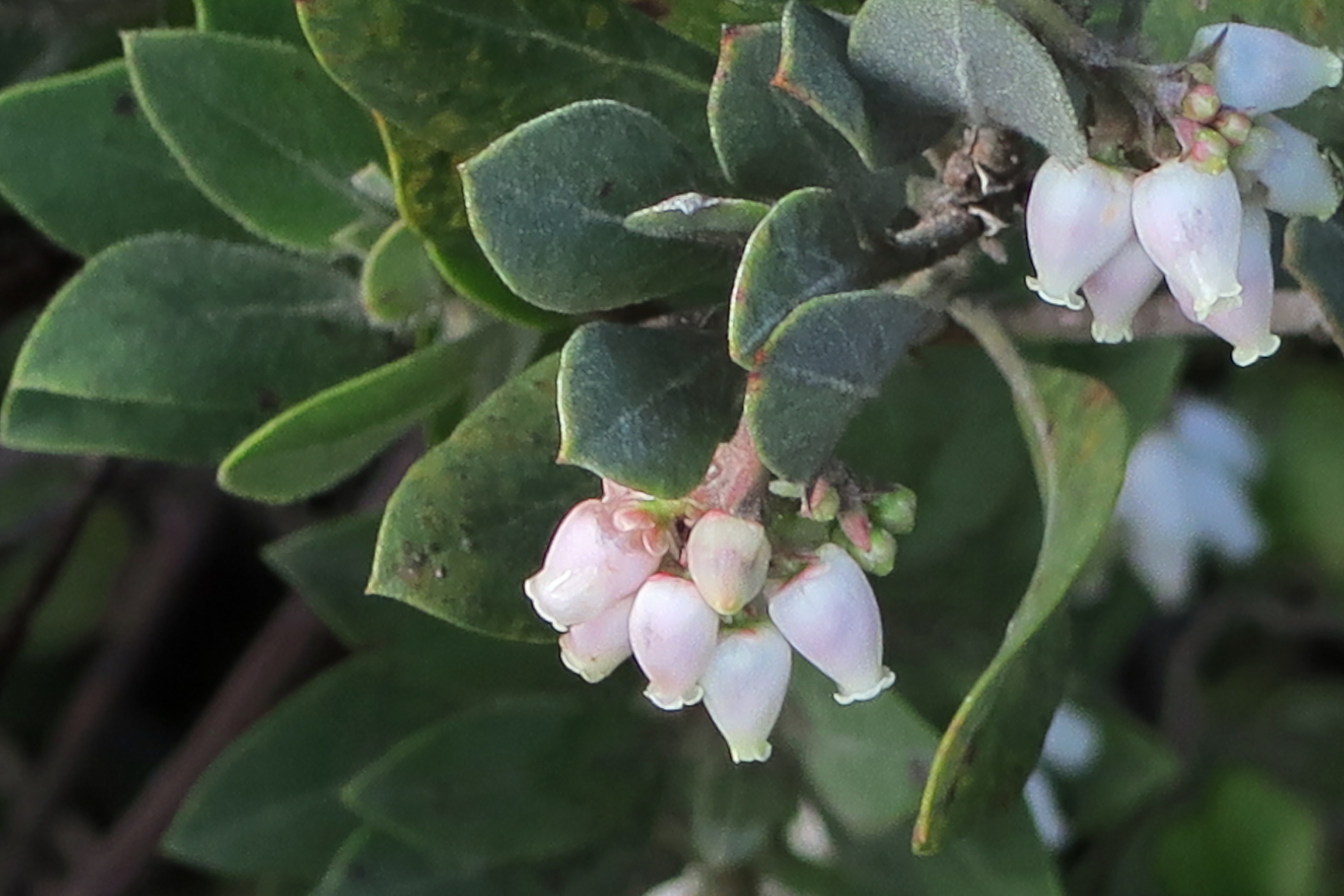

Scientific classification
- Kingdom: Plantae
- Clade: Tracheophytes
- Clade: Angiosperms
- Clade: Eudicots
- Clade: Asterids
- Order: Ericales
- Family: Ericaceae
- Genus: Arctostaphylos
- Species: A. nortensis

Binomial name
- Arctostaphylos nortensis (P.V.Wells) P.V.Wells

Synonyms
- Arctostaphylos columbiana subsp. nortensis P.V.Wells

= Arctostaphylos nortensis =

Del Norte manzanita

Species of flowering plant

Arctostaphylos nortensis, common name Del Norte manzanita, is a shrub narrowly endemic to the mountains along the Oregon/California state line. It has been reported from only 3 counties: Del Norte County, California; and Curry and Josephine Counties in Oregon. The plant grows in chaparral and open forests at elevations of 400–600 m (1,300–2,000 ft), occasionally on serpentine.

== Description ==
Arctostaphylos nortensis is a shrub up to 5 m (16 ft) tall, bearing racemes of white flowers. It is distinguished from other species in the region by the long hairs on its twigs, flowers and fruits.
