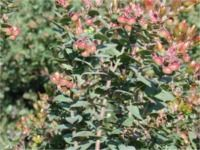

Conservation status
- Critically Imperiled (NatureServe)

Scientific classification
- Kingdom: Plantae
- Clade: Tracheophytes
- Clade: Angiosperms
- Clade: Eudicots
- Clade: Asterids
- Order: Ericales
- Family: Ericaceae
- Genus: Arctostaphylos
- Species: A. pajaroensis

Binomial name
- Arctostaphylos pajaroensis (J.E.Adams ex McMinn) J.E.Adams

= Arctostaphylos pajaroensis =

Species of flowering plant

Arctostaphylos pajaroensis is a species of manzanita known by the common name Pajaro manzanita. It is endemic to California, where it is known mainly from Monterey County.

Historical occurrences have been noted in Santa Cruz County and far western San Benito County — these may no longer exist. Most of the extant populations are located in the hills south of the Pajaro River Valley. It is a member of the chaparral plant community.

== Description ==
Arctostaphylos pajaroensis is an erect shrub growing at least 1 metre (3.3 ft) tall and known to exceed 4 metres (13 ft) in height. It has shreddy red or grayish bark with woolly hairs and long white bristles on its smaller twigs. The dense foliage is made up of gray-green, reddish-tinted leaves with smooth, toothed, or rolled edges. They are oval to somewhat triangular in shape and 2 to 4 centimeters long.

The shrub flowers in the winter, bearing large loose inflorescences of pink to nearly white urn-shaped flowers. The fruit is a drupe about 7 millimeters wide.

== See also ==
- California chaparral and woodlands
