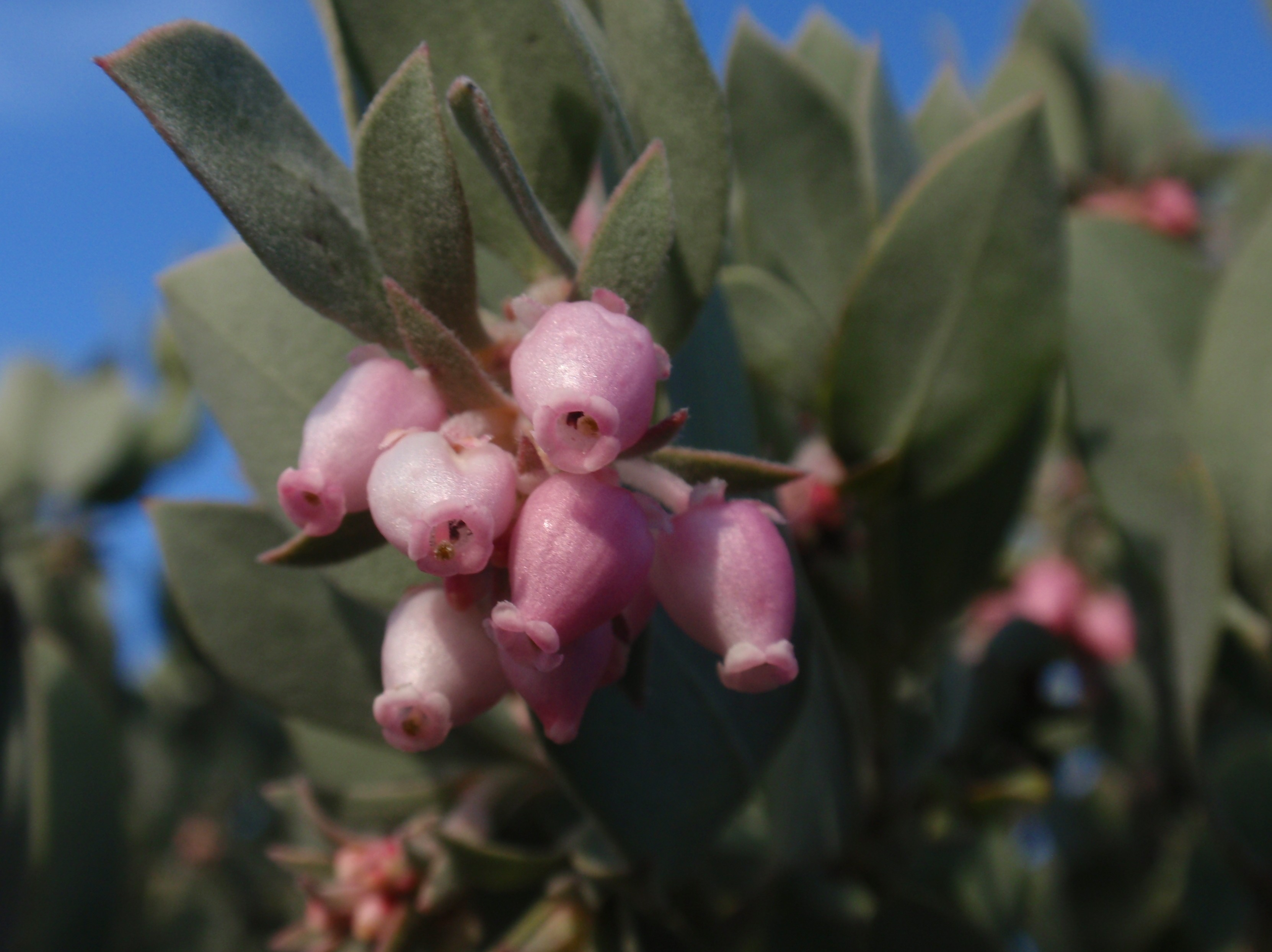

Scientific classification
- Kingdom: Plantae
- Clade: Embryophytes
- Clade: Tracheophytes
- Clade: Spermatophytes
- Clade: Angiosperms
- Clade: Eudicots
- Clade: Asterids
- Order: Ericales
- Family: Ericaceae
- Genus: Arctostaphylos
- Species: A. canescens

Binomial name
- Arctostaphylos canescens Eastw.

= Arctostaphylos canescens =

Species of flowering plant

Arctostaphylos canescens, common name hoary manzanita, is a species of manzanita.

== Distribution ==
Arctostaphylos canescens is native to the coastal mountain ranges of southwestern Oregon and northern California, where it grows in forest and chaparral plant communities.

== Description ==
The Arctostaphylos canescens is a shrub varying in shape from short and matted to spreading up to 2 meters (6 ft 7 in) in height. Smaller branches and twigs are hairy to woolly. The smooth-edged leaves are oval in shape and pointed at the tip, woolly to rough and waxy, and up to 5 centimeters long.

The plant blooms in dense inflorescences of whitish, urn-shaped manzanita flowers which are woolly inside. The fruit is a hairy drupe 0.5 to 1 centimeter wide.
