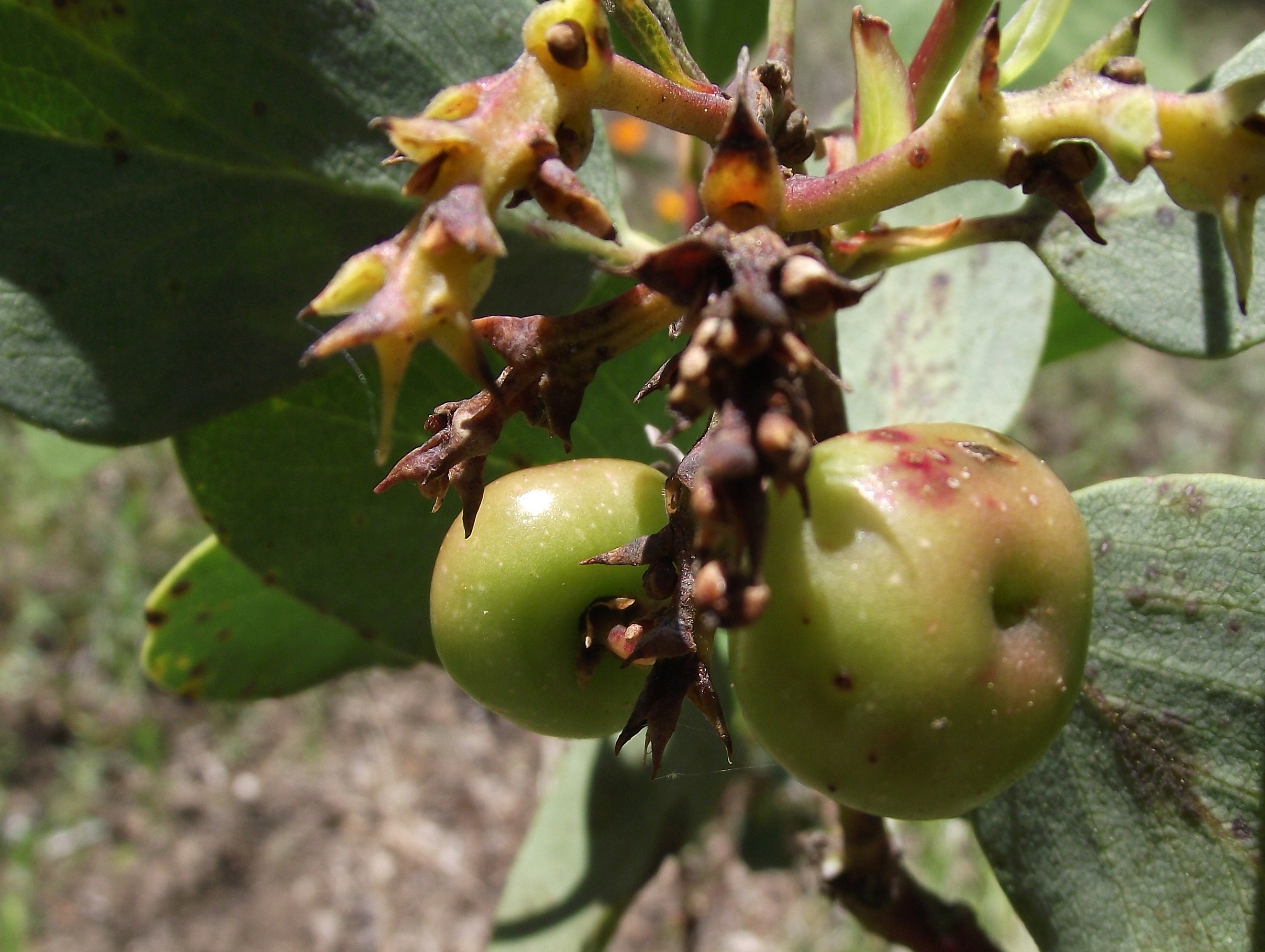
- ssp. truei

Scientific classification
- Kingdom: Plantae
- Clade: Tracheophytes
- Clade: Angiosperms
- Clade: Eudicots
- Clade: Asterids
- Order: Ericales
- Family: Ericaceae
- Genus: Arctostaphylos
- Species: A. mewukka

Binomial name
- Arctostaphylos mewukka Merriam

= Arctostaphylos mewukka =

Indian manzanita

Species of flowering plant

Arctostaphylos mewukka is a species of manzanita known by the common name Indian manzanita.

== Description ==
Arctostaphylos mewukka is a mostly hairless shrub growing to heights between 1 and 4 meters, with or without a burl at the base. Leaves are variable in shape, from nearly round to widely lance-shaped, up to 7 centimeters long, and dull, smooth, and sometimes waxy in texture. The inflorescence is a loose cluster of urn-shaped manzanita flowers. The fruit is a dark reddish-brown spherical drupe up to 1.6 centimeters wide.

== Distribution and habitat ==
Arctostaphylos mewukka is endemic to the Sierra Nevada of California, where it grows in the mountain chaparral in the temperate coniferous forests of the range.
