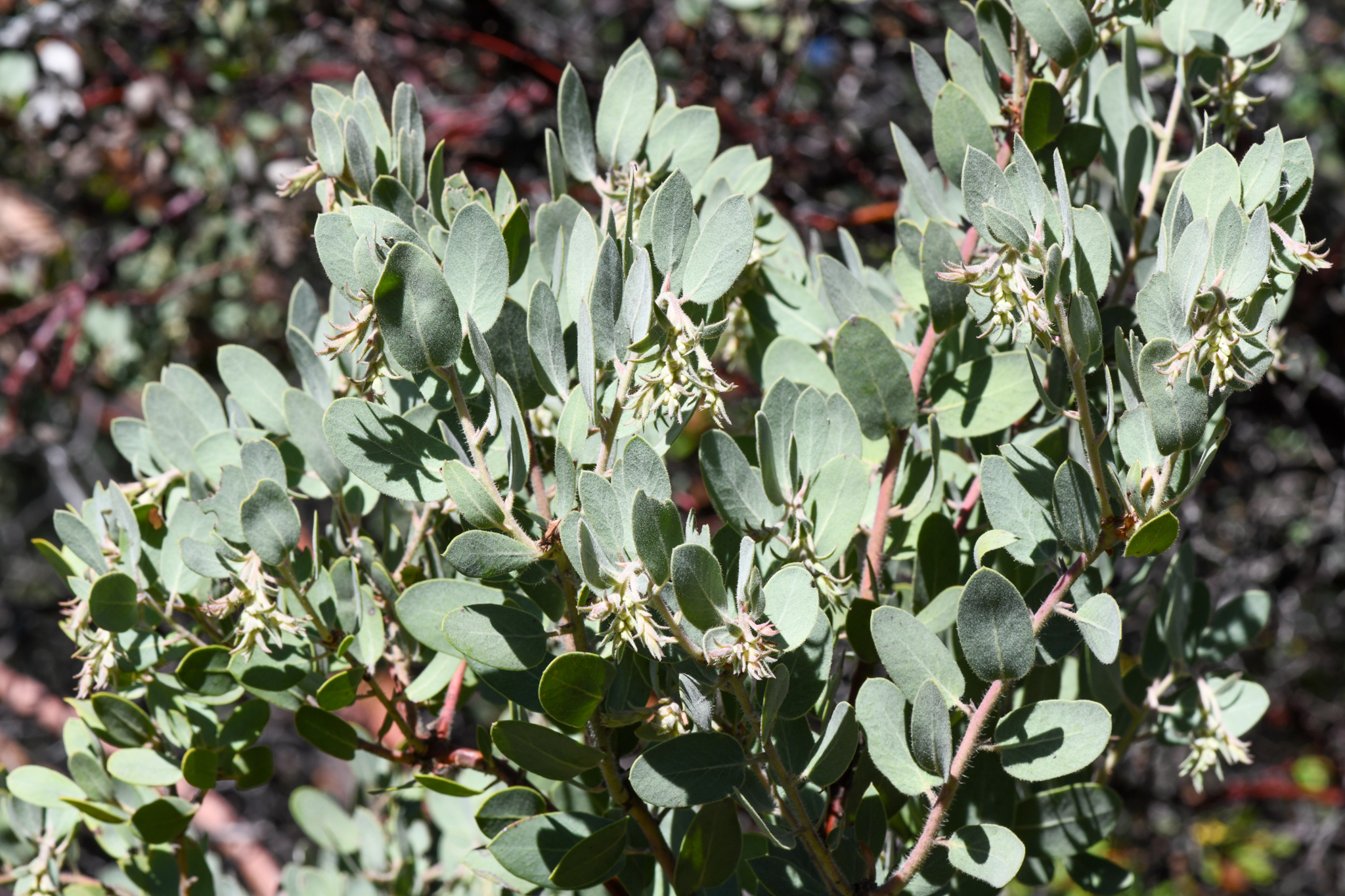

Scientific classification
- Kingdom: Plantae
- Clade: Tracheophytes
- Clade: Angiosperms
- Clade: Eudicots
- Clade: Asterids
- Order: Ericales
- Family: Ericaceae
- Genus: Arctostaphylos
- Species: A. hooveri

Binomial name
- Arctostaphylos hooveri P.V. Wells

= Arctostaphylos hooveri =

Santa Lucia manzanita

Species of tree

Arctostaphylos hooveri, the Santa Lucia manzanita, is a plant species endemic to the Santa Lucia Mountains in Monterey County, California. It grows in woodlands and in chaparral scrub-land at elevations of 900–1200 m.

Arctostaphylos hooveri is a shrub or tree up to 8 meters tall, but typically ranges between 1 and 6 meters tall and 1 and 3 meters wide. Leaves are egg-shaped, whitish with wax, up to 6 cm long. Flowers are white, conical to urn-shaped, in branched panicles, and have red stems. Fruits are spherical or nearly so, about 8 mm in diameter.

== Communities ==
Communities where arctostaphylos hooveri is commonly found in include the Northern Coastal Sage Scrub, Northern Juniper Woodland, Coastal Prairie, Redwood Forest, Riparian, Sub-Alpine Forest and Yellow Pine Forest. This plant survives best at a pH of 5.00-6.00 with 100–160 cm of rainfall per year. This is a rare plant that survives best in the sunny coastal regions of California.
