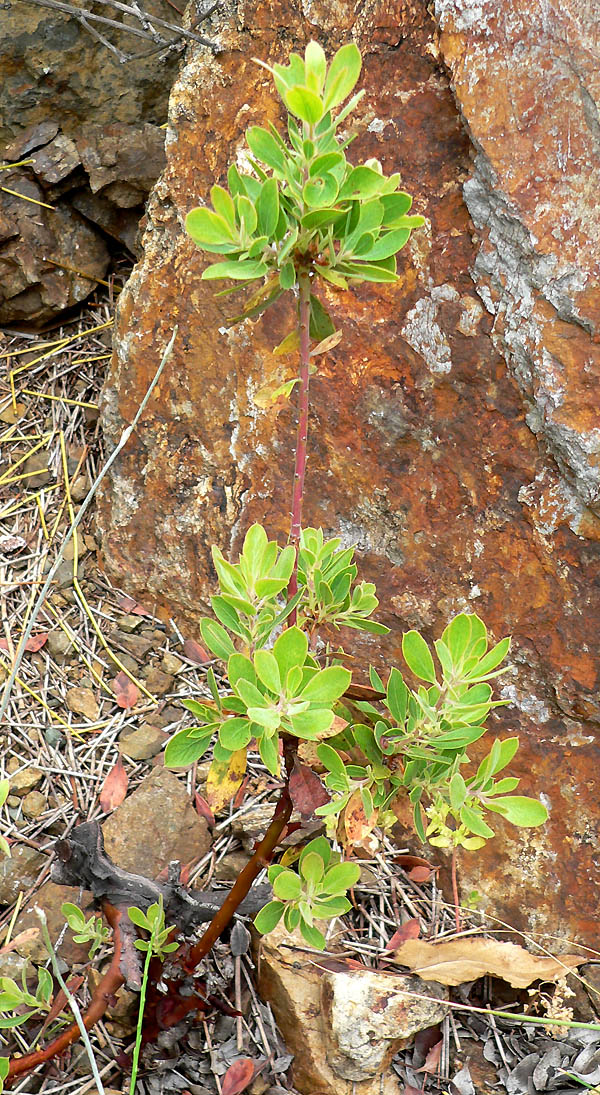

Scientific classification
- Kingdom: Plantae
- Clade: Tracheophytes
- Clade: Angiosperms
- Clade: Eudicots
- Clade: Asterids
- Order: Ericales
- Family: Ericaceae
- Genus: Arctostaphylos
- Species: A. parryana

Binomial name
- Arctostaphylos parryana Lemmon

= Arctostaphylos parryana =

Species of flowering plant

Arctostaphylos parryana, with the common name Parry manzanita, is a species of manzanita.

== Description ==
Arctostaphylos parryana is an erect manzanita, standing on red-barked stems and reaching up to two meters in height. The leaves are bright green, generally oval in shape and pointed. The small pink-tinted white flowers are borne in densely bunched inflorescences. The fruit is a rounded drupe which contains two or more seeds which have fused into one body.

Its 7 to 10 mm wide fruits were a food of the Luiseño of Southern California.

== Distribution ==
This shrub is endemic to California, where it grows in the western section of the Transverse Ranges, from coastal Santa Barbara County to the San Gabriel Mountains.

This is a manzanita of chaparral and low-elevation coniferous forest ecosystems.

== See also ==
- California chaparral and woodlands
