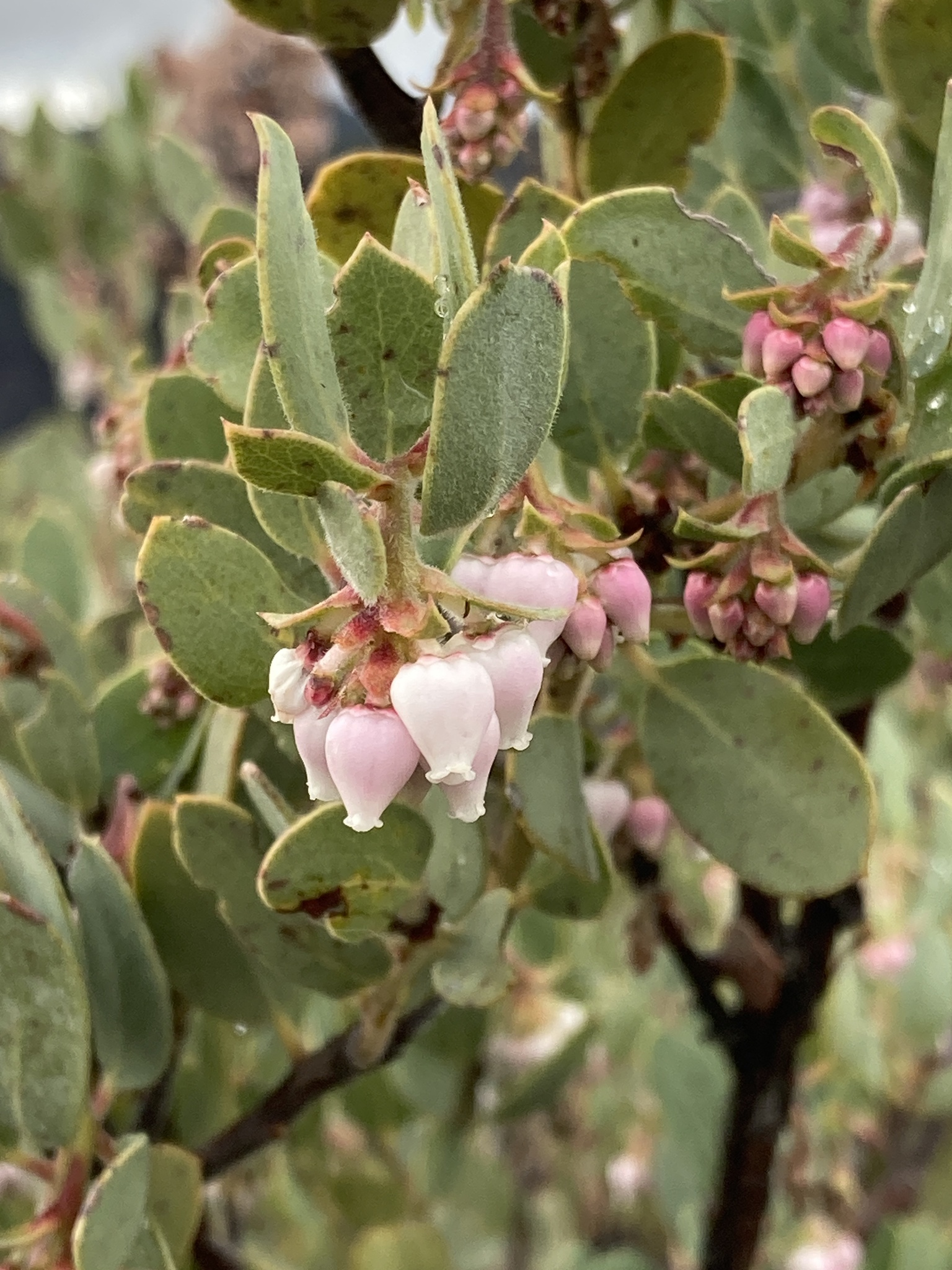

Conservation status
- Critically Imperiled (NatureServe)

Scientific classification
- Kingdom: Plantae
- Clade: Tracheophytes
- Clade: Angiosperms
- Clade: Eudicots
- Clade: Asterids
- Order: Ericales
- Family: Ericaceae
- Genus: Arctostaphylos
- Species: A. nissenana

Binomial name
- Arctostaphylos nissenana Merriam

= Arctostaphylos nissenana =

Species of flowering plant

Arctostaphylos nissenana is a species of manzanita known by the common name Nissenana manzanita or El Dorado manzanita. It is endemic to California, where it grows in the woodlands and chaparral of the Sierra Nevada foothills, mostly in El Dorado County.

== Description ==
Arctostaphylos nissenana is a shrub reaching a maximum height between one half and 1.5 meters, with gray bark and fuzzy twigs. The leaves are grayish in color, smooth or fuzzy, oval in shape, and 1 to 2 centimeters long. It blooms in plentiful small clusters of urn-shaped manzanita flowers, each with five lobes at its mouth. The fruit is a cylindrical drupe a few centimeters long which contains five seeds.
