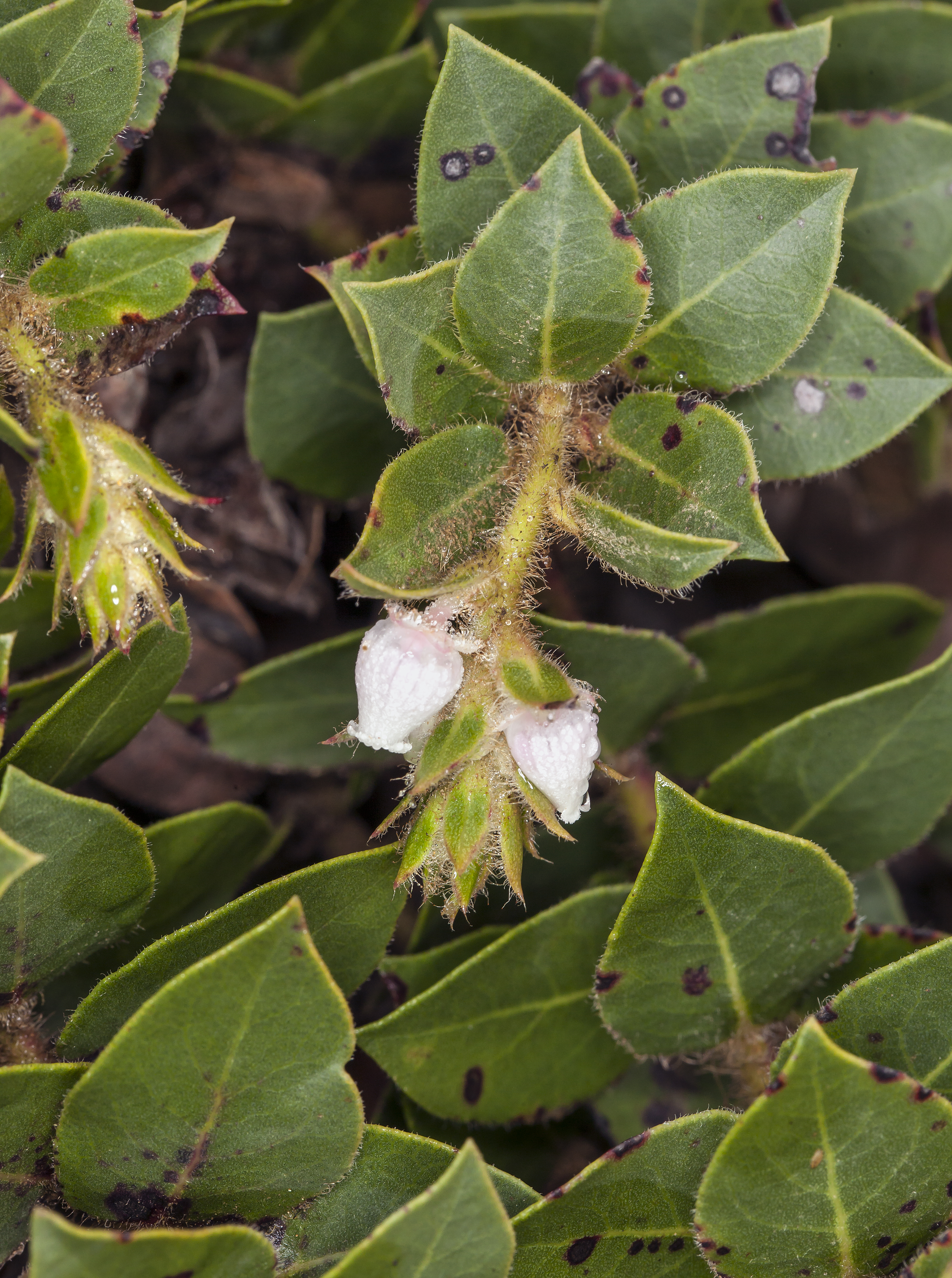

Conservation status
- Critically Imperiled (NatureServe)

Scientific classification
- Kingdom: Plantae
- Clade: Tracheophytes
- Clade: Angiosperms
- Clade: Eudicots
- Clade: Asterids
- Order: Ericales
- Family: Ericaceae
- Genus: Arctostaphylos
- Species: A. imbricata

Binomial name
- Arctostaphylos imbricata Eastw.

= Arctostaphylos imbricata =

Species of flowering plant

Arctostaphylos imbricata is a species of manzanita known by the common name San Bruno Mountain manzanita.

It is endemic to San Mateo County, California, where it is known only from six populations on San Bruno Mountain. Despite its rarity, this manzanita is not a federally listed endangered species because five of its six remaining populations are protected by the San Bruno Mountain Habitat Conservation Plan.

This plant grows in the chaparral plant community. Like many other chaparral species, it requires wildfire for reproduction. Fire suppression in its native habitat is one threat to its survival.

== Description ==
Arctostaphylos imbricata is a small, spreading, matlike shrub forming flat tangles or mounds less than a meter in height. The branches are coated in long bristles tipped in resin glands. The light green, glandular leaves are round to oval with rough, bristly, dull surfaces and smooth or toothed edges. They are up to 4 centimeters long and 3 wide.

The dense inflorescence is crowded with rounded, urn-shaped white flowers, each only 3 to 5 millimeters long. The fruit is a hairy, glandular drupe about 7 millimeters wide.

== See also ==
- California coastal sage and chaparral ecoregion
