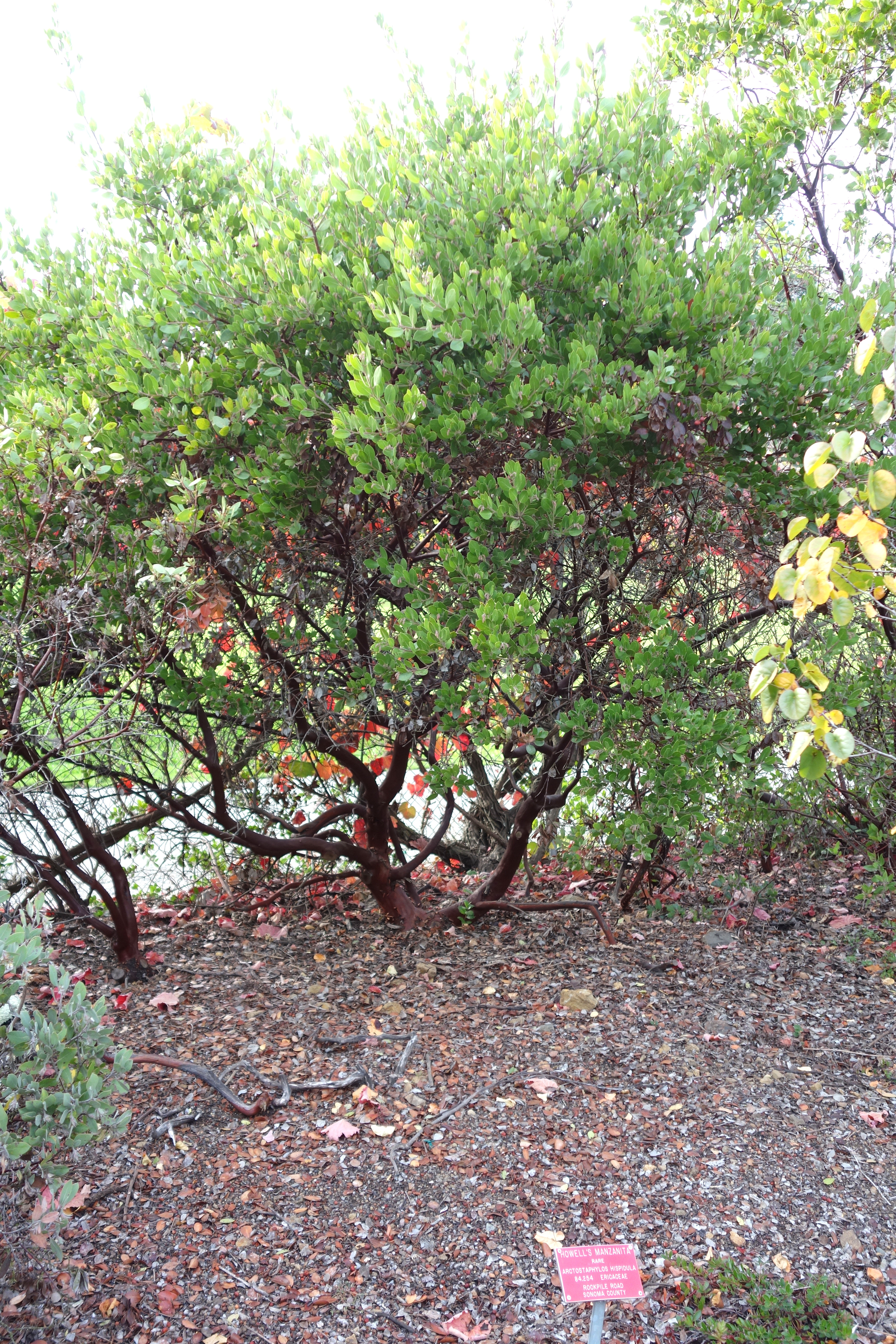

Scientific classification
- Kingdom: Plantae
- Clade: Tracheophytes
- Clade: Angiosperms
- Clade: Eudicots
- Clade: Asterids
- Order: Ericales
- Family: Ericaceae
- Genus: Arctostaphylos
- Species: A. hispidula

Binomial name
- Arctostaphylos hispidula Howell

= Arctostaphylos hispidula =

Species of flowering plant

Arctostaphylos hispidula is a species of manzanita known by the common names Gasquet manzanita and Howell's manzanita. It is native to the coastal mountain ranges of southern Oregon and northern California, where it is an uncommon member of the serpentine soils flora and other mountain plant communities. This is a spreading or erect shrub reaching a maximum height between one and two meters. The twigs and foliage are bristly and glandular, the dark green leaves oval to broadly lance-shaped and up to 3 centimeters long. The shrub blooms in crowded inflorescences of urn-shaped flowers and produces whitish to tan colored drupes each 5 to 7 millimeters wide.
