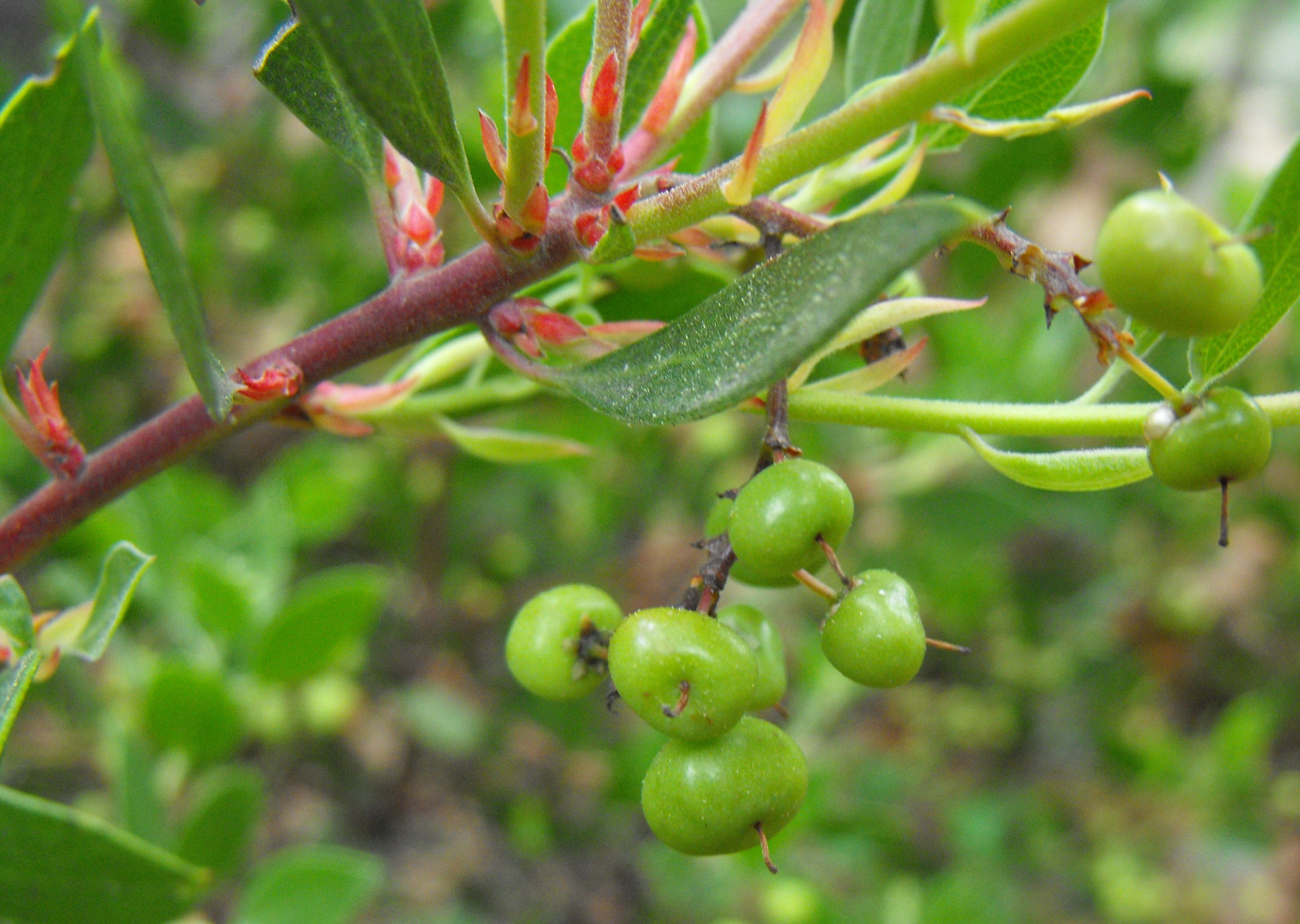

Scientific classification
- Kingdom: Plantae
- Clade: Tracheophytes
- Clade: Angiosperms
- Clade: Eudicots
- Clade: Asterids
- Order: Ericales
- Family: Ericaceae
- Genus: Arctostaphylos
- Species: A. stanfordiana

Binomial name
- Arctostaphylos stanfordiana Parry

= Arctostaphylos stanfordiana =

Species of flowering plant

Arctostaphylos stanfordiana, with the common name Stanford's manzanita, is a species of manzanita that is endemic to northern California. It is known from the outer North Coast Ranges north of the San Francisco Bay Area.

== Description ==
Arctostaphylos stanfordiana is a bushy shrub growing .5–3 metres (1.6–9.8 ft) in height. Leaves are oblong to widely lance-shaped, shiny green, and up to 5 centimeters long.

The inflorescence is a loose cluster of urn-shaped manzanita flowers which are pink, with some so pale that they are nearly white. The fruit is an oblong drupe about 7 millimeters wide.

Subspecies

There are three subspecies:

- A. s. ssp. decumbens (Rincon manzanita) - rare subspecies endemic to Sonoma County
- A. s. ssp. raichei (Raiche's manzanita) - known mostly from Mendocino County
- A. s. ssp. stanfordiana (Stanford's manzanita) - more widespread than other subspecies

== See also ==
- California chaparral and woodlands
- California montane chaparral and woodlands
