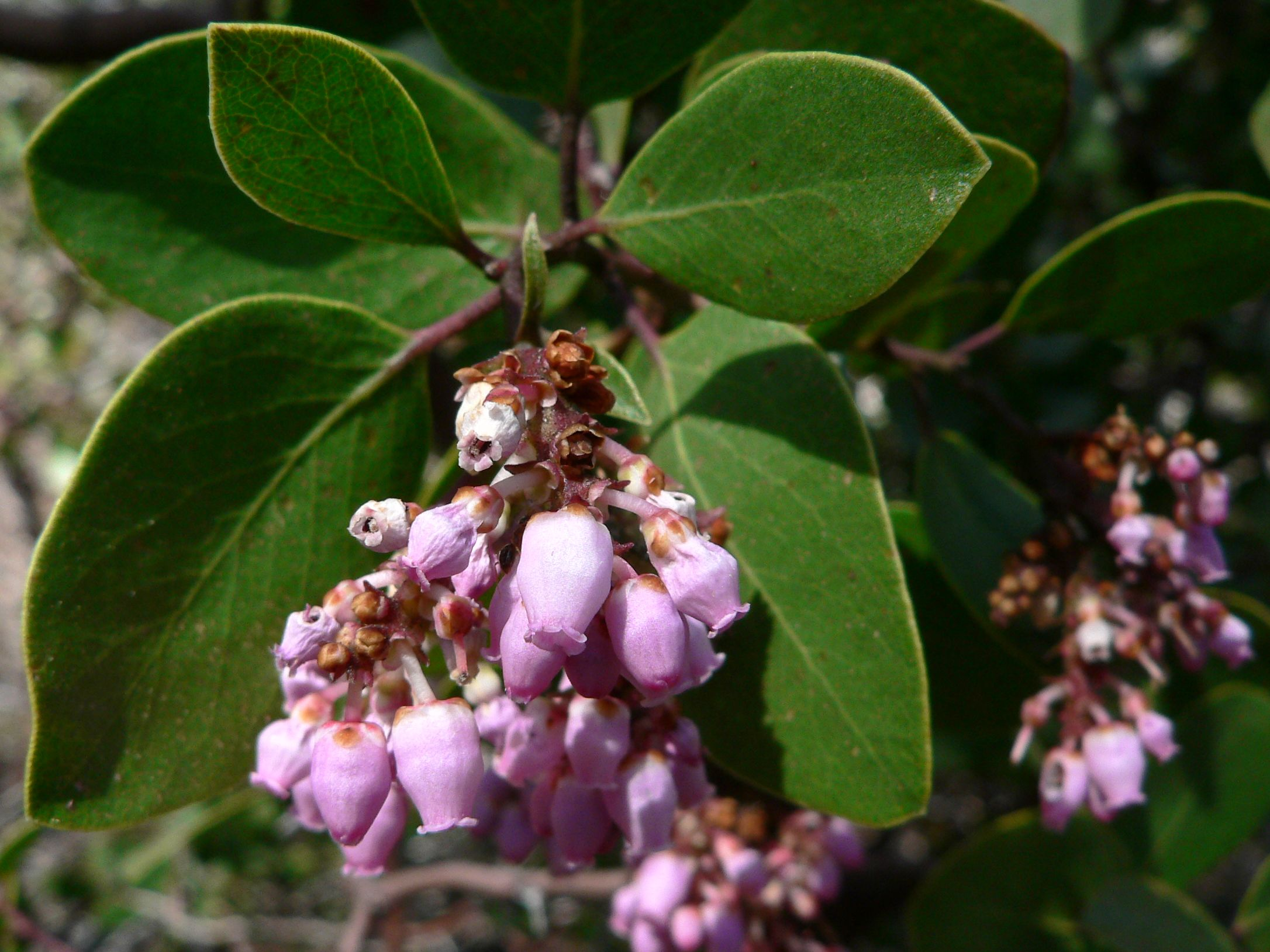
- Whiteleaf manzanita (Arctostaphylos viscida)

Scientific classification
- Kingdom: Plantae
- Clade: Tracheophytes
- Clade: Angiosperms
- Clade: Eudicots
- Clade: Asterids
- Order: Ericales
- Family: Ericaceae
- Subfamily: Arbutoideae
- Genus: Arctostaphylos; Adanson

Type species
- Arctostaphylos uva-ursi (Linnaeus) Sprengel

Species
- About 90, see text.

= Arctostaphylos =

Genus of flowering plants in the heath family

Arctostaphylos (/ˌɑːrktoʊˈstæfɪləs, -lɒs/; from ἄρκτος árktos "bear" and σταφυλή staphulḗ "bunch of grapes") is a genus of plants within the family Ericaceae. Many plants within the genus Arctostaphylos are also commonly called manzanitas(/ˌmænzəˈniːtəz/) or bearberries. There are 107 taxa within Arctostaphylos, 106 of which are found in the California floristic province. From prostrate shrubs to small erect trees, Arctostaphylos is known for characteristic red bark, urn-shaped flowers and being fire adapted .

== Description ==
Stem - Usually red-stemmed, Arctostaphylos can range from completely smooth to grey-shreddy bark. In some species, stems can be found with tomentum, or hairs.

Burls or lignotubers are an enlarged stem base or root crown carrying dormant buds for resprouting post disturbance. About ⅓ of all species are burl formers. Burls are often helpful for identifying specific species.

Leaves - Tending to grow alternately, all Arctostaphylos species are evergreen. A common step to help better identify down to the species level is by examining leaf surfaces. For example, Arctostaphylos tomentosa has stomata only abaxially, while Arctostaphylos glandulosa subsp. glandulosa is bifacial, having similar surfaces on the top and bottom sides of the leaf.

Flowers - A characteristic feature of Arctostaphylos is its urn-like flowers. The corolla is usually composed of five fused petals. These flowers are very common in the clade Arbutoideae.

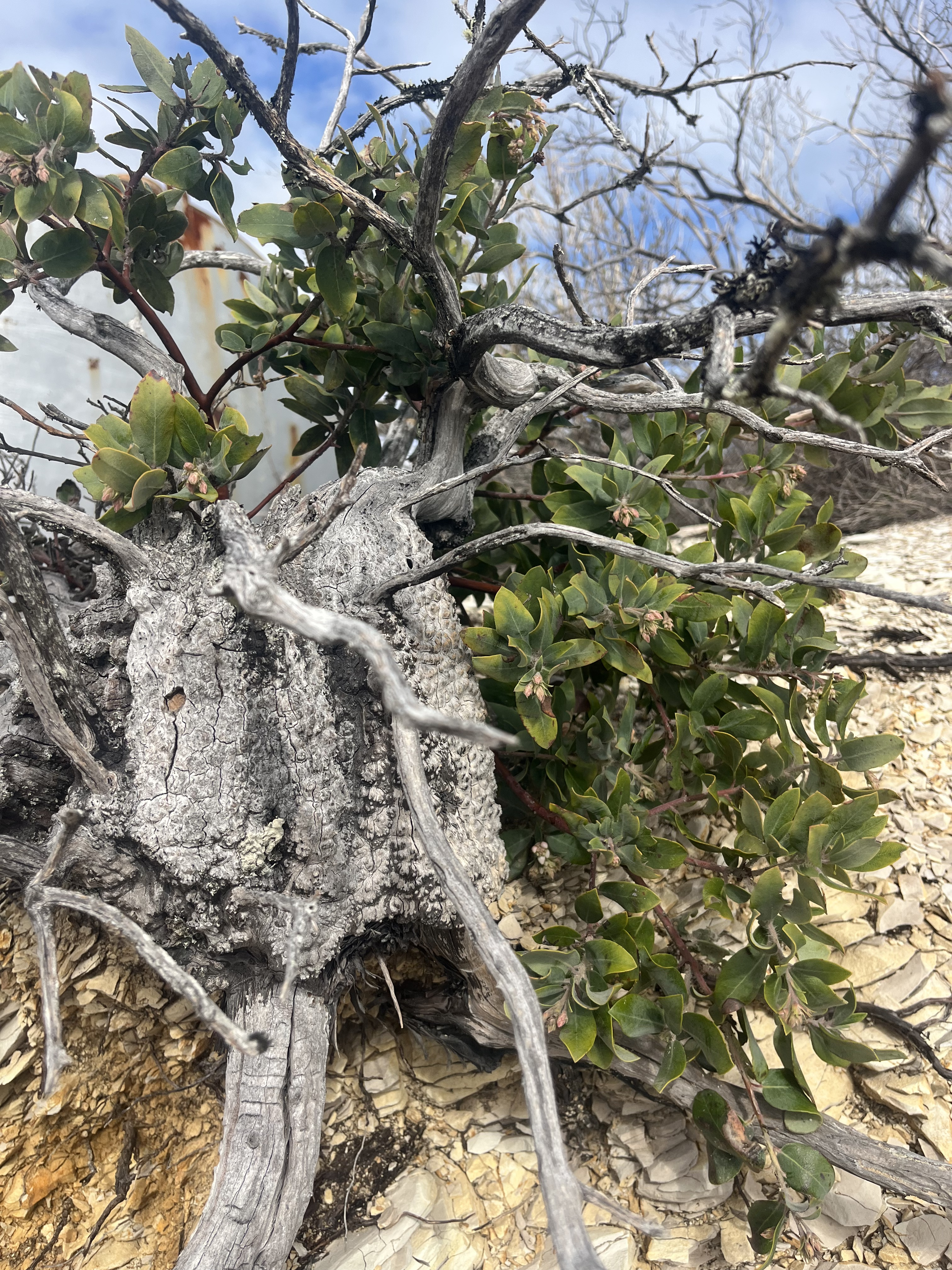
Arctostaphylos crustacea subsp crinita - resprouting from burl

Fruit - Classified as a drupe, Arctostaphylos fruit is commonly spheric. The seeds found within the mealy mesocarp are often called stones.

== Distribution ==
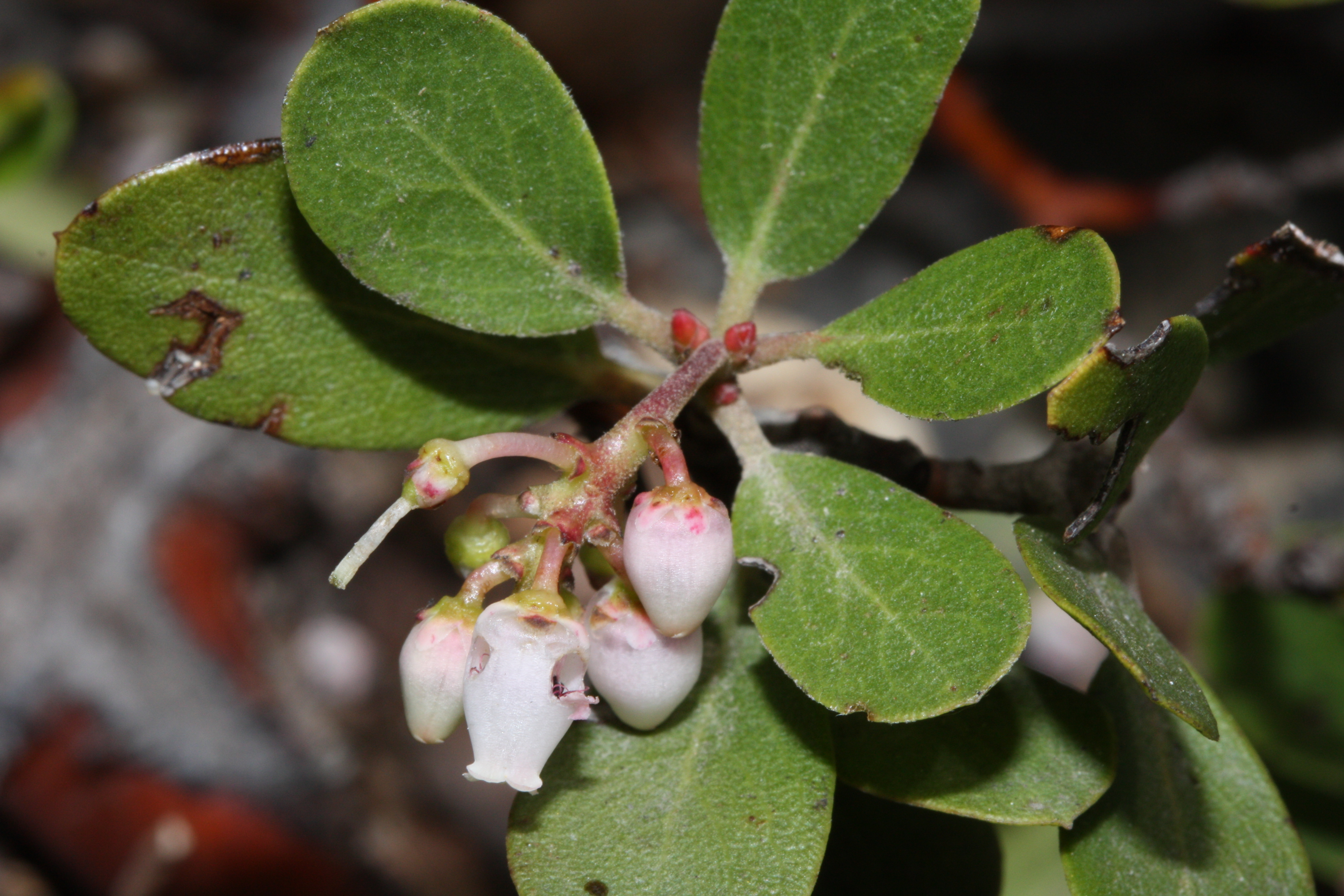
Pinemat manzanita (A. nevadensis) occurs from Washington to California.

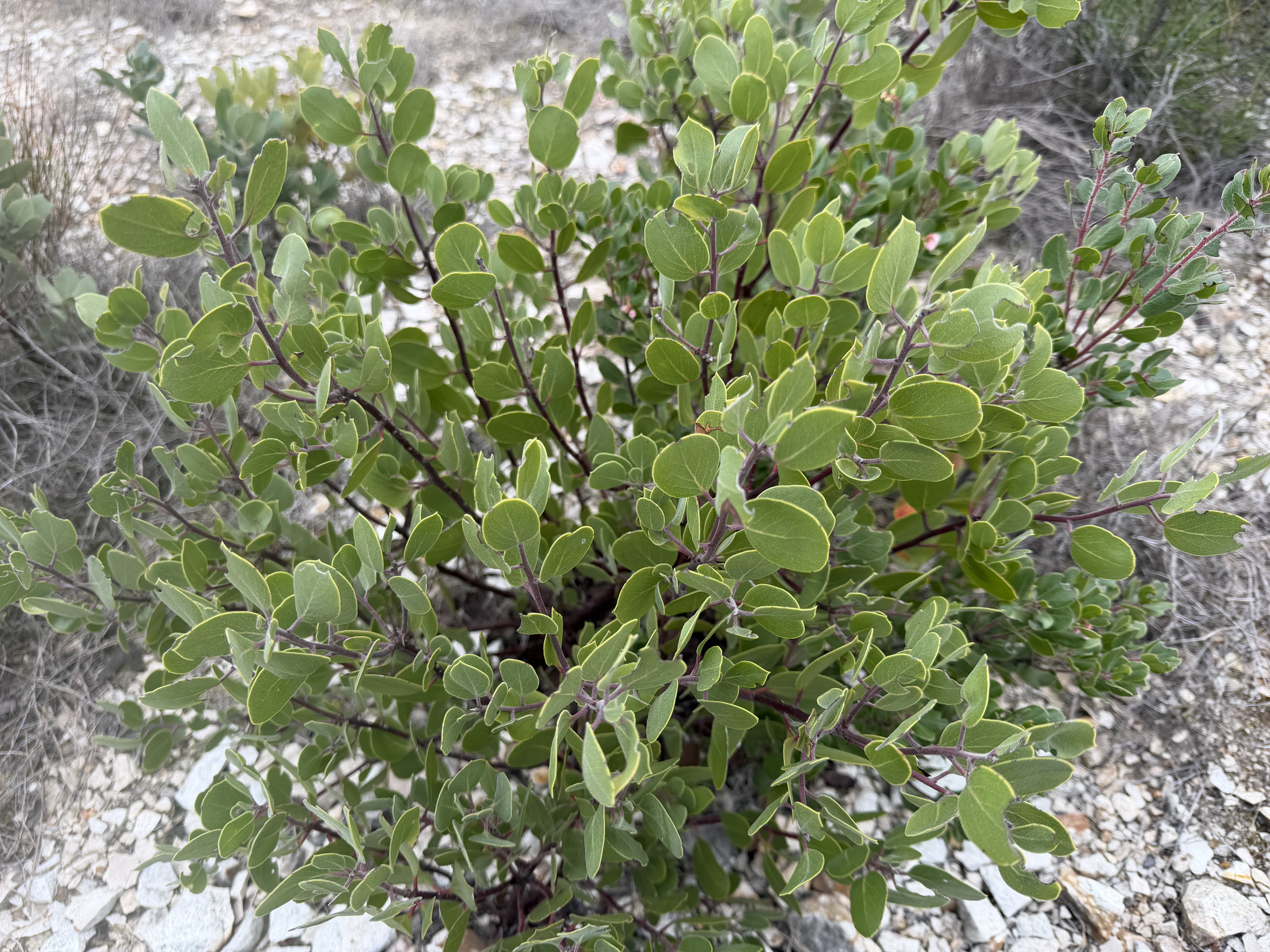
Arctostaphylos ohloneana post fire growth

The majority of Arctostaphylos species can be found within the California floristic province. However one species, A. uva-ursi (common bearberry), is adapted to arctic and subarctic climates and has a circumpolar distribution in northern North America, Asia and Europe.

An unusual association of manzanita occurs on Hood Mountain, in Sonoma County, California, where stands of pygmy forest dominated by Hesperocyparis sargentii are found.

== Evolution ==
Arctostaphylos falls within the Arbutoideae subfamily along with Arbutus, Arctous, Comarostaphylis, Ornithostaphylos, and Xylococcus.

Arctostaphylos is the most diverse genus within this clade. The complex permutation of modern flora can be attributed to the change from the Cretaceous to the Tertiary. During the Oligocene geologic uplift and an altering climate restricted a majority of the Arbutoideae to western North America. Post Pleistocene, the growing changes in the edaphos along with climatic shifts and the incredibly unique topography within California, caused dramatic speciation, specifically within the genus Arctostaphylos.

== Fossil record ==
One fossil fruit of †Arctostaphylos globula and several fossil fruits of †Arctostaphylos menzelii have been described from middle Miocene strata of the Fasterholt area near Silkeborg in Central Jutland, Denmark.

== Ecology ==
Arctostaphylos can usually can be found on sites with poor soil. Mycorrhizal fungi are a large reason this genus can tolerate low nutrient conditions. Many of California's shrublands experience a high intensity fire regime which habitually burn completely through stands of manzanitas. Many chaparral species have developed certain adaptations to persist post fire.

One way manzanitas persist is through seed banks. Seed banks are characteristic of all species within Arctostaphylos. Manzanitas have seed that is dispersed in a dormant stage, only germinating post fire due to chemicals found in smoke. Obligate seeders lack a lignotuber/burl and are killed by fire. In contrast, facultative-seeders or burl formers resprout after fire. Most species are obligate seeders, and population survival depends on post-fire recruitment. It is known that rodent caches are crucial to the development of the seed bank.

In Arctostaphylos all species produce flowers with poricidal anthers. Poricidal anthers produce pollen that is dehisced toward the floral opening through an apical pore on the anther, often during a process call buzz pollination. In Arctostaphylos, pollination of the unique urn shaped flowers is achieved through sonication or buzz pollination. Buzz pollination is the process when certain bee species contract their indirect flight muscles on flowers extremely fast, these vibrations then release pollen from poricidal anthers and onto the bee's body.

Arctostaphylos species are used as food plants by the larvae of some Lepidoptera species including Coleophora glaucella and Coleophora arctostaphyli (which feeds exclusively on A. uva-ursi).

== Cultivation ==
Arctostaphylos are used in the horticultural trade across much of California. Prized for being drought tolerant, low maintenance and aesthetically interesting, Arctostaphylos hybrids and cultivars are common across many gardens.

== Taxonomy ==
All recognized taxa of the genus Arctostaphylos as of February 9th 2026
Species	Common name	Species	Common Name
A. andersonii	Santa Cruz Manzanita	A. pacifica	Pacific Manzanita
A. auriculata	Mount Diablo Manzanita	A. pajaroensis	Pajaro Manzanita
A. australis	Baja Manzanita	A. pallida	Alameda Manzanita
A. bakeri subsp. bakeri	Baker’s Manzanita	A. parryana subsp. parryana	Parry’s Manzanita
A. bakeri subsp. sublaevis	The Cedars Manzanita	A. parryana subsp. desertica	Desert Manzanita
A. bolensis	Bola Manzanita	A. parryana subsp. tumescens	Interior Manzanita
A. canescens subsp. canescens	Hoary Manzanita	A. patula subsp. patula	Greenleaf Manzanita
A. canescens subsp. sonomensis	Sonoma Canescent Manzanita	A. patula subsp. gankinii	Gankin’s manzanita
A. catalinae	Catalina Island Manzanita	A. pechoensis	Pecho Manzanita
A. columbiana	Columbia Manzanita	A. peninsularis subsp. peninsularis	Peninsula Manzanita
A. confertifolia	Santa Rosa Island Manzanita	A. peninsularis subsp. juarzensis	Sierra Juarez Manzanita
A. crustacea subsp. crustacea	Brittleleaf Manzanita	A. pilosula	Santa Margarita Manzanita
A. crustacea subsp. crinita	Crinite Manzanita	A. pringlei subsp. pringlei	Pinkbract Manzanita
A. crustacea subsp. eastwoodiana	Eastwood’s Brittleleaf Manzanita	A. pringlei subsp. drupacea	California Pinkbract Manzanita
A. crustacea subsp. rosei	Rose’s Manzanita	A. pumila	Sandmat Manzanita
A. crustacea subsp. insulicola	Island Manzanita	A. pungens	Mexican Manzanita
A. crustacea subsp. subcordata	Santa Cruz Island Manzanita	A. purissima subsp. purissima	La Purisima Manzanita
A. cruzensis	Arroyo De La Cruz Manzanita	A. purissima subsp. globosa	Globose Manzanita
A. densiflora	Vine Hill Manzanita	A. rainbowensis	Rainbow Manzanita
A. edmundsii	Little Sur Manzanita	A. refugioensis	Refugio Manzanita
A. franciscana	Franciscan Manzanita	A. regismontana	King’s Mountain Manzanita
A. gabilanensis	Gabilan Manzanita	A. rudis	Sand Mesa Manzanita
A. glandulosa subsp. glandulosa	Eastwood’s Manzanita	A. sensitiva	Coinleaf Manzanita
A. glandulosa subsp. adamsii	Adam’s Manzanita	A. silvicola	Bonny Doon Manzanita
A. glandulosa subsp. atumescens	Punta Banda Manzanita	A. stanfordiana subsp. stanfordiana	Stanford’s Manzanita
A. glandulosa subsp. crassifolia	Del Mar Manzanita	A. stanfordiana subsp. decumbens	Rincon Ridge Manzanita
A. glandulosa subsp. cushingiana	Cushing’s Manzanita	A. stanfordiana subsp. raichei	Raiche’s Manzanita
A. glandulosa subsp. erecta	Pedregoso’s Manzanita	A. tomentosa subsp. tomentosa	Woolyleaf Manzanita
A. glandulosa subsp. gabrielensis	San Gabriel Manzanita	A. tomentosa subsp. bracteosa	Glandular Woolyleaf Manzanita
A. glandulosa subsp. howellii	Howell’s Manzanita	A. tomentosa subsp. daciticola	Dacite Manzanita
A. glandulosa subsp. leucophylla	Whiteleafed Manzanita	A. tomentosa subsp. hebeclada	Explorer’s Manzanita
A. glandulosa subsp. mollis	Transverse Range Manzanita	A. uva-ursi subsp. uva-ursi	Bearberry or Kinnikinnick
A. glauca	Bigberry Manzanita	A. uva-ursi subsp. cratericola	Guatemala Bearberry
A. glutinosa	Schreiber’s Manzanita	A. virgata	Marin Manzanita
A. hispidula	Gasquet Manzanita	A. viridissima	White-haired Manzanita
A. hookeri subsp. hearstiorum	Hearst’s Manzanita	A. viscida subsp. viscida	Whiteleaf Manzanita
A. hookeri subsp. hookeri	Hooker’s Manzanita	A. viscida subsp. mariposa	Mariposa Manzanita
A. hooveri	Hoover Manzanita	A. viscida subsp. pulchella	Coast Whiteleaf Manzanita
A. imbricata	San Bruno Mountain Manzanita		
A. incognita	Incognito Manzanita		
A. insularis	Santa Cruz Island Manzanita		
A. klamathenis	Klamath Manzanita		
A. luciana	Santa Lucia Manzanita		
A. malloryi	Mallory’s Manzanita		
A. manzanita subsp. manzanita	Common Manzanita		
A. manzanita subsp. elegans	Konocti Manzanita		
A. manzanita subsp. glaucescens	Glaucous Manzanita		
A. manzanita subsp. laevigata	Contra Costa Manzanita		
A. manzanita subsp. roofii	Roof’s Manzanita		
A. manzanita subsp. wieslanderi	Wieslander’s Manzanita		
A. mewukka subsp. mewukka	Indian Manzanita		
A. mewukka subsp. truei	True’s Manzanita		
A. montana subsp. montana	Mount Tamalpais Manzanita		
A. montana subsp. ravenii	Presidio Manzanita		
A. montaraensis	Montara Mountain Manzanita		
A. montereyensis	Monterey Manzanita		
A. moranii	Moran’s Manzanita		
A. morroensis	Morro Manzanita		
A. myrtifolia	Ione Manzanita		
A. nevadensis subsp. nevadensis	Pine Mat Manzanita		
A. nevadensis subsp. knightii	Knight’s Pine Mat Manzanita		
A. nissenana	El Dorado Manzanita		
A. nortensis	Del Norte Manzanita		
A. nummularia subsp. nummularia	Glossyleaf Manzanita		
A. nummularia subsp. mendocinoensis	Pygmy Manzanita		
A. obispoensis	Bishop Manzanita		
A. ohloneana	Ohlone Manzanita		
A. osoensis	Oso Manzanita		
A. otayensis	Otay Manzanita		

=== Ranges ===
- Subgenus Micrococcus
  - Sect. Micrococcus

Species	Common name	Range
Arctostaphylos mendocinoensis	Pygmy manzanita	
Arctostaphylos myrtifolia	Ione manzanita	California (Amador, Calaveras Counties)
Arctostaphylos nissenana	Nissenan manzanita	California (coastal and inland ranges north of San Francisco Bay)
Arctostaphylos nummularia	Glossyleaf manzanita	California (Mendocino County)

- Subgenus Arctostaphylos, which has three sections:
  - Sect. Arctostaphylos

Species	Common name	Range
Arctostaphylos alpina	Alpine bearberry	
Arctostaphylos bakeri	Baker's manzanita	California (Sonoma County)
Arctostaphylos densiflora	Sonoma manzanita	California (Sonoma County)
Arctostaphylos edmundsii	Little Sur manzanita	California (Monterey County)
Arctostaphylos franciscana	Franciscan manzanita	California (San Francisco County)
Arctostaphylos gabrielensis	San Gabriel manzanita	California (Los Angeles County)
Arctostaphylos glauca	Bigberry manzanita	California and Baja California
Arctostaphylos hispidula	Gasquet manzanita	Coastal mountain ranges of southern Oregon and northern California
Arctostaphylos hookeri	Hooker's manzanita	California
Arctostaphylos insularis	Island manzanita	California (Santa Cruz Island)
Arctostaphylos klamathensis	Klamath manzanita	California (Klamath Mountains)
Arctostaphylos manzanita	Common manzanita, whiteleaf manzanita	California (Coast Ranges and Sierra Nevada foothills)
Arctostaphylos mewukka	Indian manzanita	California (Sierra Nevada)
Arctostaphylos nevadensis	Pinemat manzanita	California
Arctostaphylos parryana	Parry manzanita	California (southern)
Arctostaphylos patula	Greenleaf manzanita	Western North America
Arctostaphylos pumila	Sandmat manzanita	California (Monterey County)
Arctostaphylos pungens	Pointleaf manzanita	Southwestern United States and to northern and central Mexico
Arctostaphylos rudis	Shagbark manzanita	California (southern central coast)
Arctostaphylos stanfordiana	Stanford's manzanita	California (Outer North Coast Ranges north of the San Francisco Bay Area)
Arctostaphylos uva-ursi	Bearberry	Europe, Asia, North America
Arctostaphylos viscida	Sticky manzanita, whiteleaf manzanita	California and Oregon

  - Sect. Foliobracteata

Species	Common name	Range
Arctostaphylos andersonii	Santa Cruz manzanita	Santa Cruz Mountains (CA)
Arctostaphylos auriculata	Mount Diablo manzanita	Mount Diablo (CA)
Arctostaphylos canescens	Hoary manzanita	Coastal ranges of SW OR and N CA
Arctostaphylos catalinae	Santa Catalina Island manzanita	Santa Catalina Island (CA)
Arctostaphylos columbiana	Hairy manzanita	West coast from N. CA to S. BC
Arctostaphylos confertiflora	Santa Rosa Island manzanita	Santa Rosa Island (CA)
Arctostaphylos cruzensis	La Cruz manzanita	Monterey and San Luis Obispo counties (CA)
Arctostaphylos glandulosa	Eastwood manzanita	Coastal slops from OR, CA, Baja California
Arctostaphylos glutinosa	Schreiber's manzanita	Santa Cruz County (CA)
Arctostaphylos hooveri	Hoover's manzanita	Santa Lucia Mountains (CA)
Arctostaphylos imbricata	San Bruno Mountain manzanita	San Bruno Mountain (CA)
Arctostaphylos luciana	Santa Lucia manzanita	southern Santa Lucia Mountains (CA)
Arctostaphylos malloryi	Mallory's manzanita	Inner North Coast Ranges west and northwest of the Sacramento Valley (CA)
Arctostaphylos montaraensis	Montara manzanita	San Bruno Mountain and Montara Mountain (CA)
Arctostaphylos montereyensis	Monterey manzanita	Monterey County (CA)
Arctostaphylos morroensis	Morro manzanita	Morro Bay (CA)
Arctostaphylos nortensis	Del Norte manzanita	Del Norte County (CA), Curry County (OR), Josephine County (OR)
Arctostaphylos obispoensis	Serpentine manzanita	Southern Santa Lucia Mountains (CA)
Arctostaphylos osoensis	Oso manzanita	Los Osos Valley (San Luis Obispo, CA)
Arctostaphylos otayensis	Otay manzanita	San Diego County (CA)
Arctostaphylos pajaroensis	Pajaro manzanita	Monterey County, Santa Cruz County, San Benito County (CA)
Arctostaphylos pallida	Pallid manzanita	
Arctostaphylos pechoensis	Pecho manzanita	
Arctostaphylos pilosula	La Panzo manzanita	
Arctostaphylos purissima	La Purissima manzanita	
Arctostaphylos refugioensis	Refugio manzanita	
Arctostaphylos regismontana	Kings Mountain manzanita	
Arctostaphylos silvicola	Bonny Doon manzanita	
Arctostaphylos tomentosa	Woolyleaf manzanita	
Arctostaphylos virgata	Bolinas manzanita	
Arctostaphylos viridissima	Whitehair manzanita	
Arctostaphylos wellsii	Wells' manzanita	

  - Sect. Pictobracteata

Species	Common name	Range
Arctostaphylos pringlei	Pringle manzanita	

- Unassigned

Species	Common name	Range
Arctostaphylos rainbowensis	Rainbow manzanita	
Arctostaphylos gabilanensis	Gabilan manzanita	
Arctostaphylos ohloneana	Ohlone manzanita	

See also the closely related genus Comarostaphylis, previously often included in Arctostaphylos.
