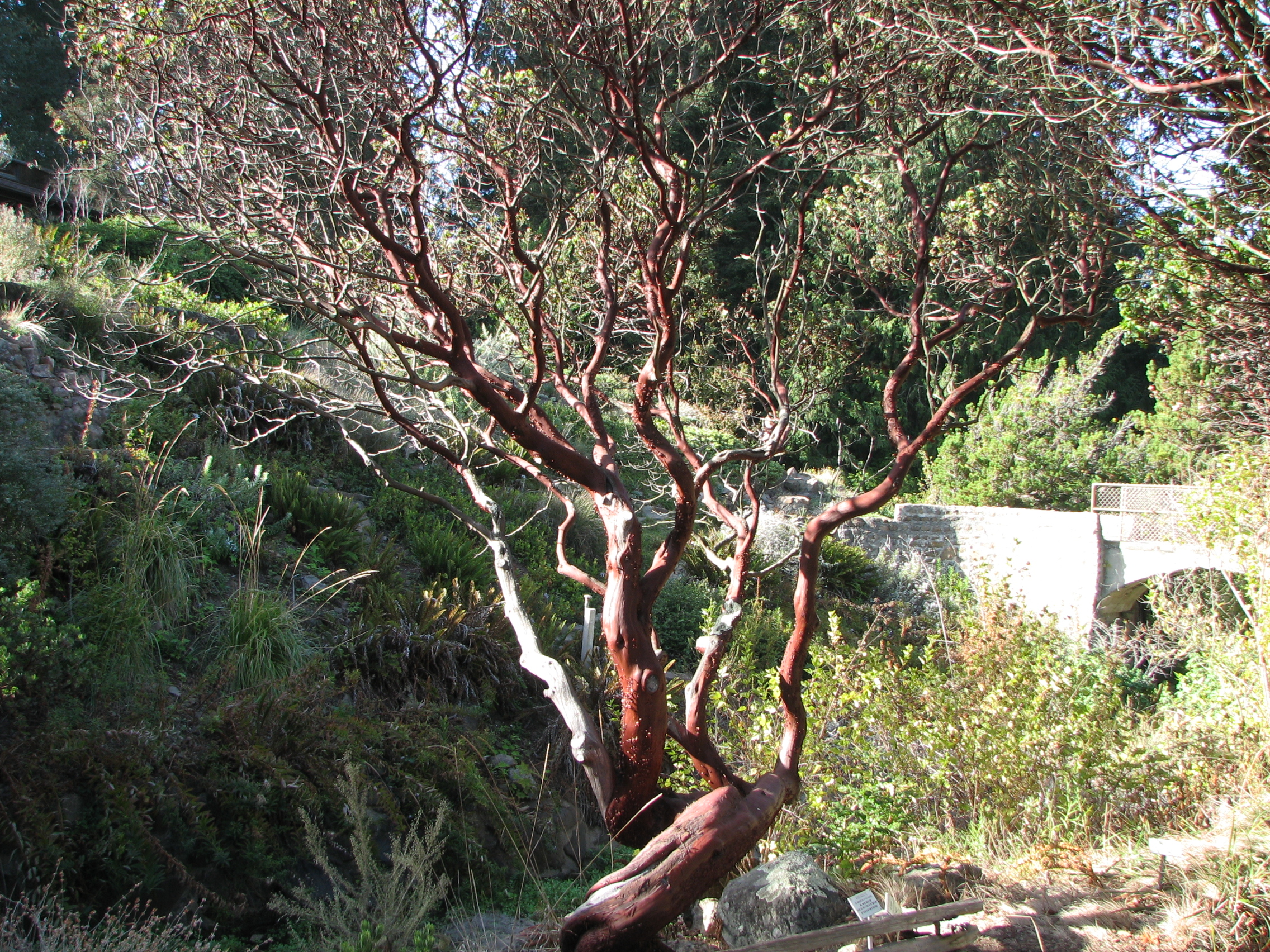

Conservation status
- Imperiled (NatureServe)

Scientific classification
- Kingdom: Plantae
- Clade: Tracheophytes
- Clade: Angiosperms
- Clade: Eudicots
- Clade: Asterids
- Order: Ericales
- Family: Ericaceae
- Genus: Arctostaphylos
- Species: A. regismontana

Binomial name
- Arctostaphylos regismontana Eastw.

= Arctostaphylos regismontana =

Species of flowering plant

Arctostaphylos regismontana is a species of manzanita known by the common name Kings Mountain manzanita. It is endemic to California, where it is known from the northern slopes of the Santa Cruz Mountains in the southern San Francisco Bay Area.

It can be found in chaparral and broadleaf and coniferous forest on granite and sandstone soils.

== Description ==
This is an erect shrub reaching over two meters in height and known to exceed four meters. It is bristly and glandular, exuding sticky resins. It has a dense foliage of curved oval-shaped leaves which are greenish in color and fuzzy and sticky in texture. They are smooth or toothed along the edges and up to 6 centimeters long.

The inflorescence is an open cluster of conical manzanita flowers each one half to one centimeter long. The fruit is a hairy, sticky drupe.

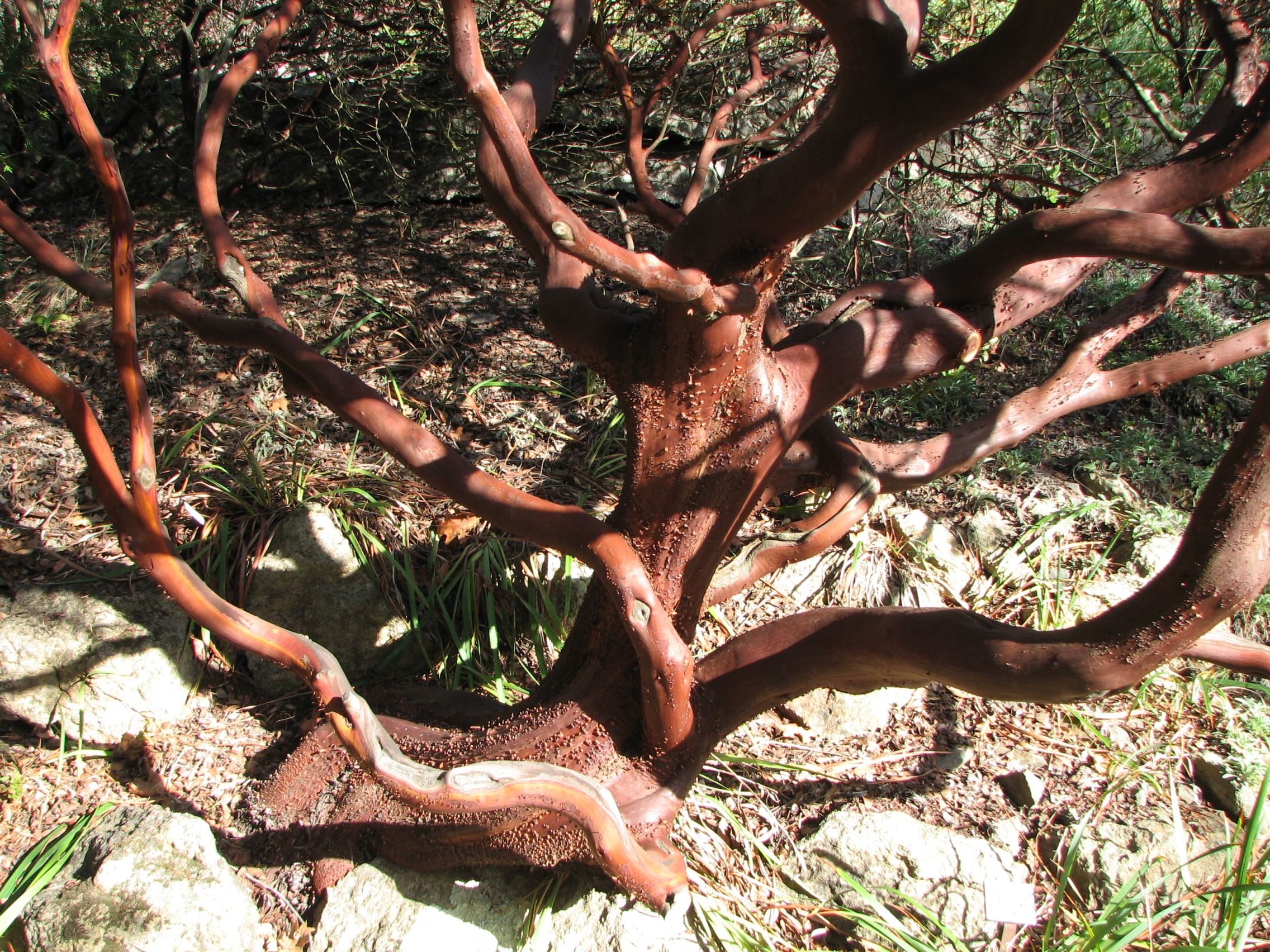
King's Mountain Manzanita, Arctostaphylos Regismontana

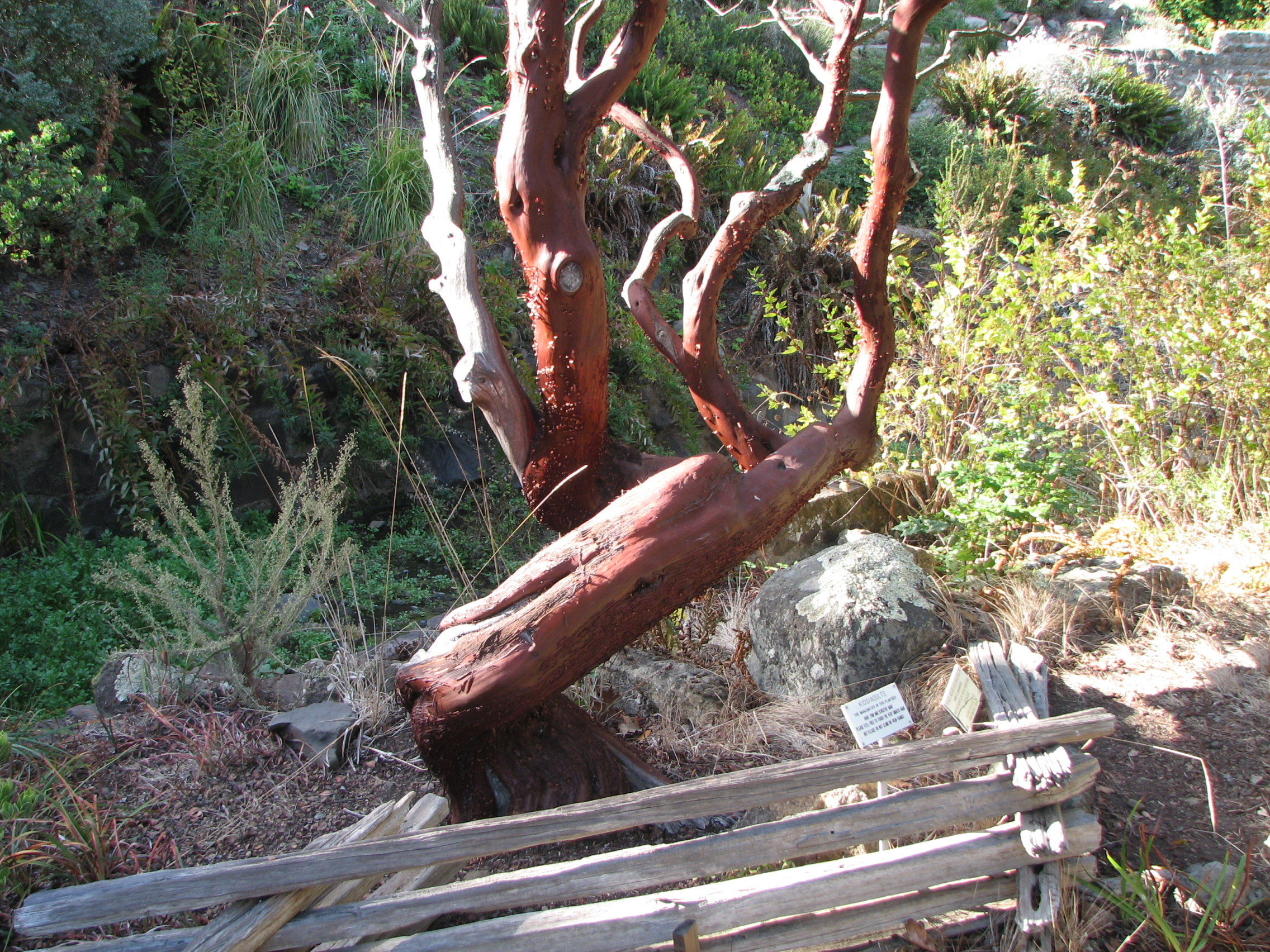

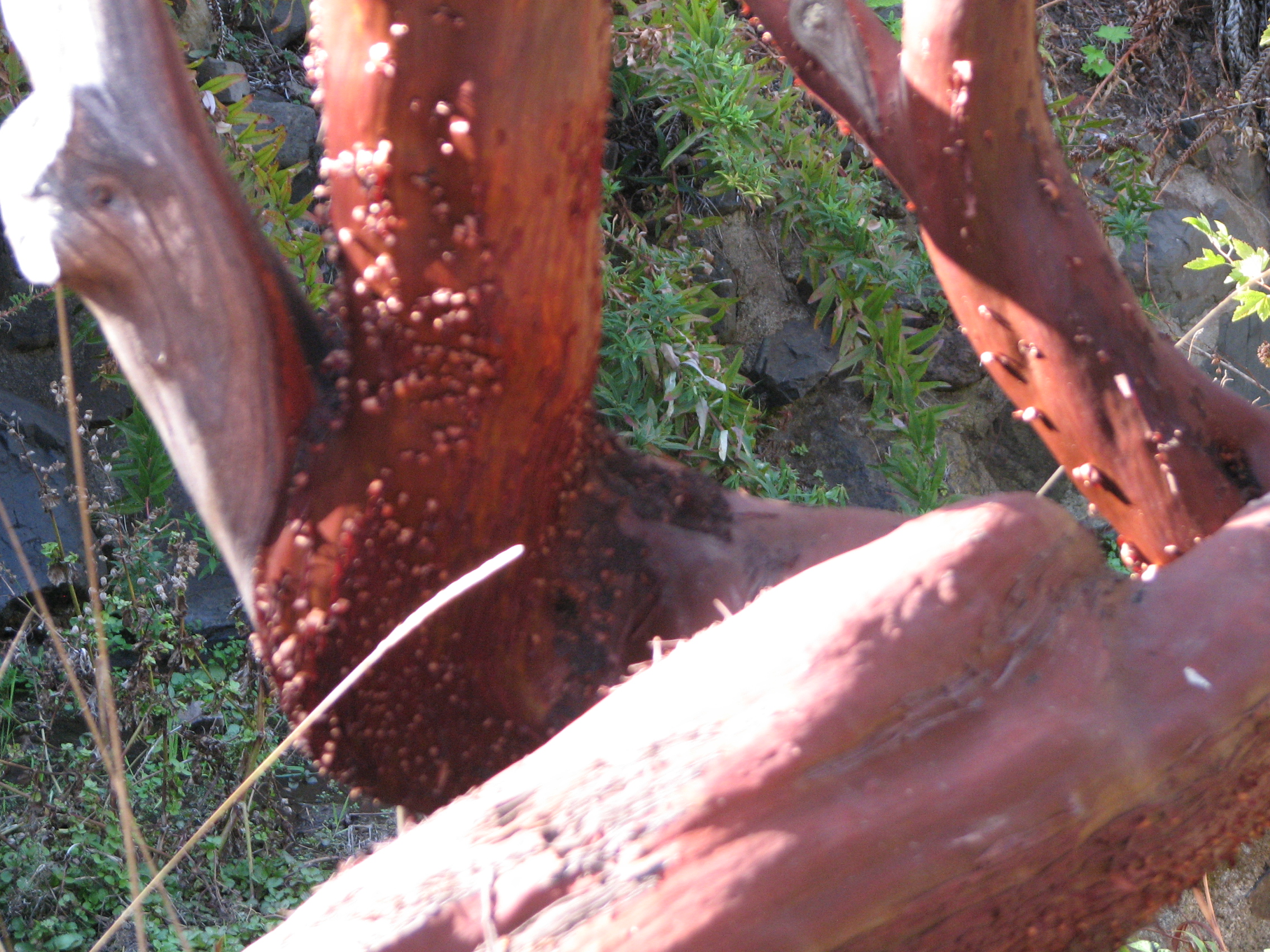
detail
