= Arctostaphylos wellsii =

Well's manzanita

Conservation status
- Unrankable (NatureServe)

Scientific classification
- Kingdom: Plantae
- Clade: Tracheophytes
- Clade: Angiosperms
- Clade: Eudicots
- Clade: Asterids
- Order: Ericales
- Family: Ericaceae
- Genus: Arctostaphylos
- Species: A. wellsii

Binomial name
- Arctostaphylos wellsii W.Knight

Species of flowering plant

Arctostaphylos wellsii (common name Well's manzanita or Pismo manzanita) is a plant that grows at elevations between 90 and 1200 ft in San Luis Obispo county in California. The plant is an evergreen shrub native to chaparral and coniferous forests. Arctostaphylos wellsii is extremely rare and considered seriously endangered.

Arctostaphylos wellsii can grow to six feet high and form very dense stands. The plant can stand high temperatures and drought but is sensitive to freezing weather. Arctostaphylos wellsii has smooth red stems gray foliage and white flowers.
