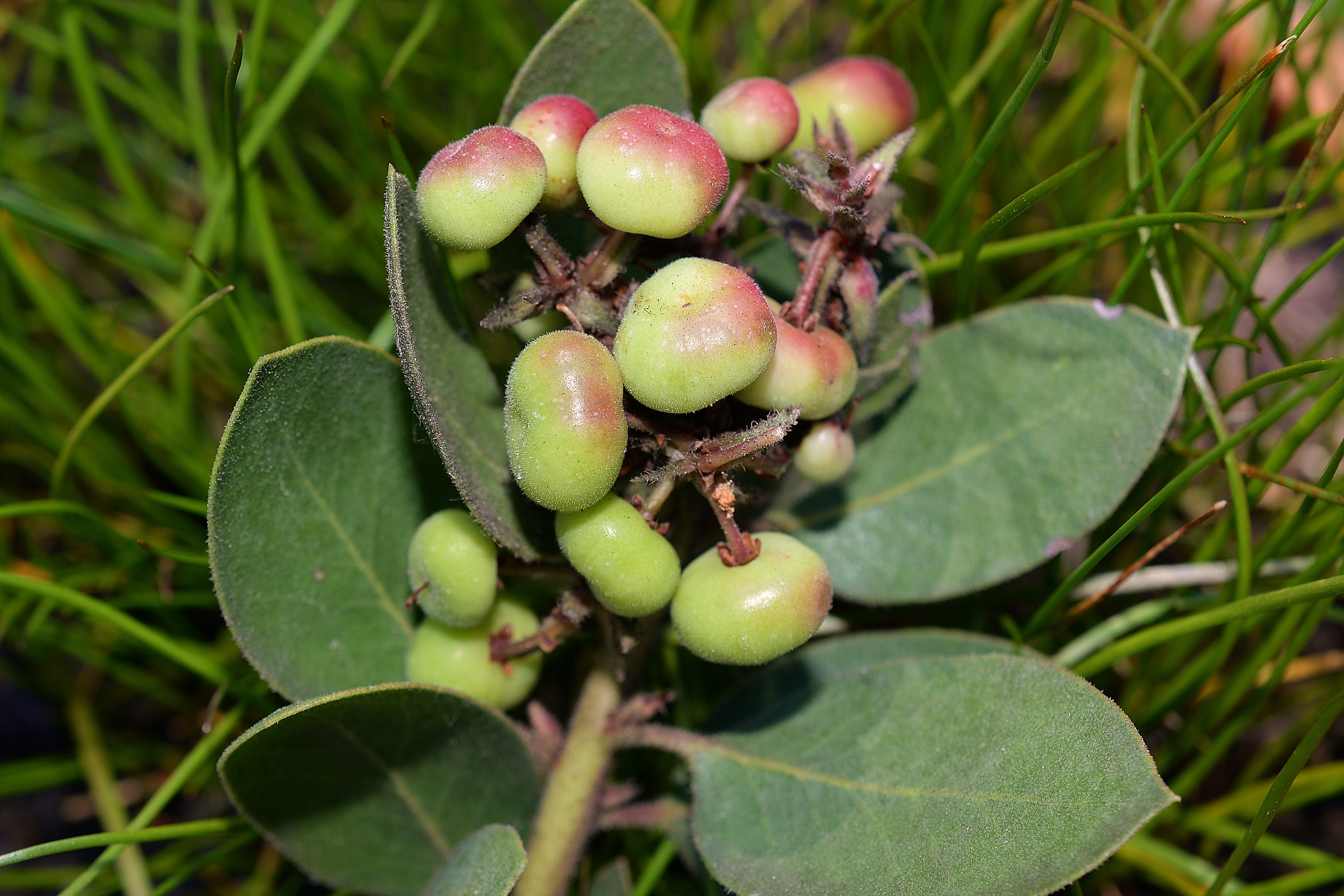

Conservation status
- Imperiled (NatureServe)

Scientific classification
- Kingdom: Plantae
- Clade: Tracheophytes
- Clade: Angiosperms
- Clade: Eudicots
- Clade: Asterids
- Order: Ericales
- Family: Ericaceae
- Genus: Arctostaphylos
- Species: A. montereyensis

Binomial name
- Arctostaphylos montereyensis Hoover

= Arctostaphylos montereyensis =

Species of flowering plant

Arctostaphylos montereyensis is a species of manzanita known by the common names Monterey manzanita and Toro manzanita. It is endemic to Monterey County, California, where it is known from only a few occurrences around Fort Ord and Toro County Park near Salinas. It is a plant of maritime chaparral on sandy soils.

== Description ==
This is a shrub reaching a maximum height between one and two meters, with bristly, glandular twigs. The dark green leaves are rough, bristly, and smooth-edged, sometimes with a waxy texture. They are 2 to 3 centimeters long and round to oval in shape. The inflorescence is a dense cluster of urn-shaped flowers, and the fruit is a bristly, glandular drupe about a centimeter wide.
