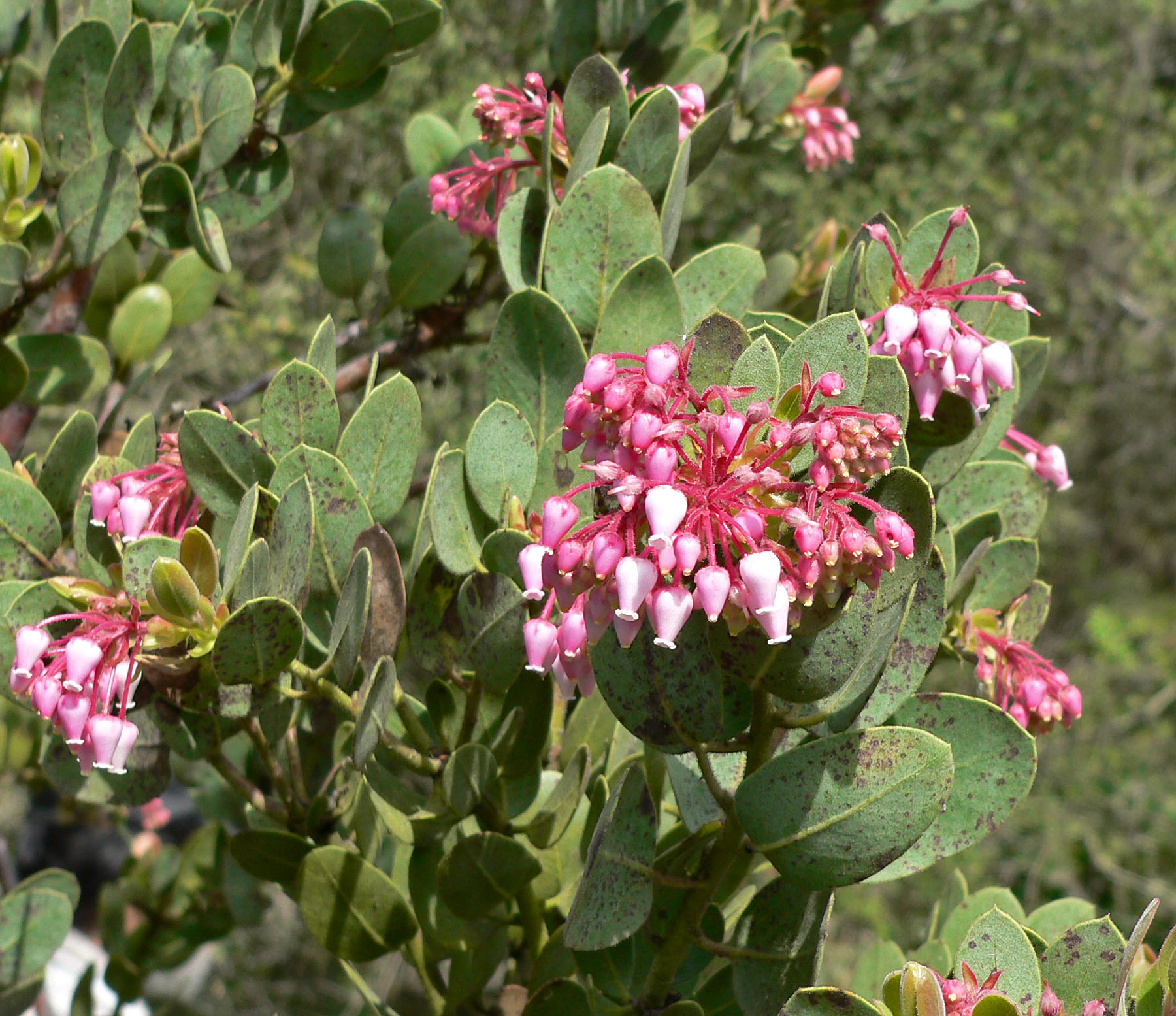
- Arctostaphylos pringlei subsp. drupacea

Conservation status
- Least Concern (IUCN 3.1)

Scientific classification
- Kingdom: Plantae
- Clade: Tracheophytes
- Clade: Angiosperms
- Clade: Eudicots
- Clade: Asterids
- Order: Ericales
- Family: Ericaceae
- Genus: Arctostaphylos
- Species: A. pringlei

Binomial name
- Arctostaphylos pringlei Parry
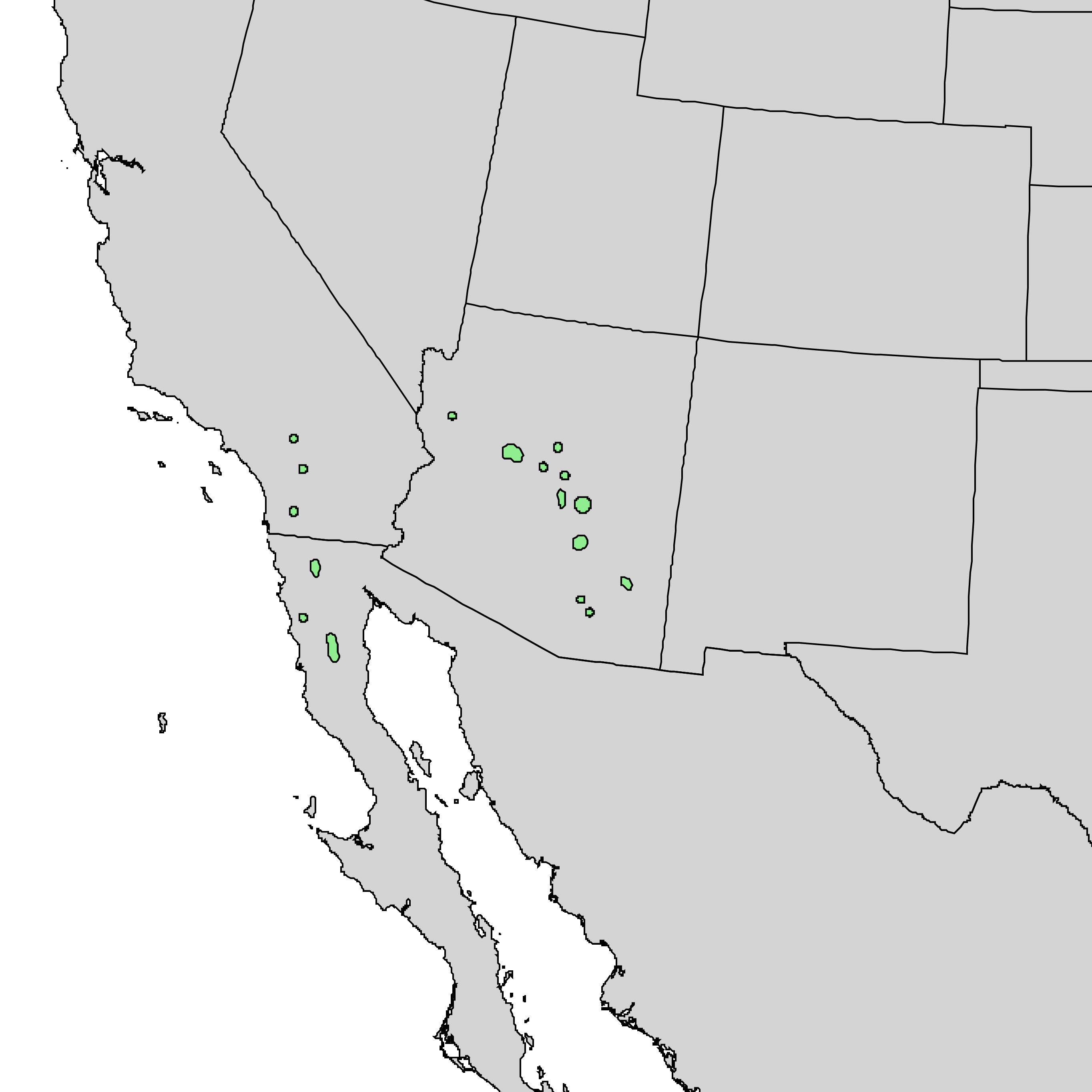
- Range of Arctostaphylos pringlei

= Arctostaphylos pringlei =

Pringle manzanita

Species of flowering plant

Arctostaphylos pringlei (common name Pringle manzanita) is a plant that grows at elevations between 4000 and 7000 ft in southern California, Arizona, and southwest Utah.

== Description ==
Pringle manzanita is a gray-green leaved shrub. It grows to about 4–6 ft. The plant may occasionally forms dense thickets. Pringle manzanita blooms in early spring forming small, whitish pink, bell-shaped flowers, occurring in clusters that later form red berries. The bark is smooth and mahogany-colored.
