= Coleophora glaucella =

Scientific classification
- Kingdom: Animalia
- Phylum: Arthropoda
- Class: Insecta
- Order: Lepidoptera
- Family: Coleophoridae
- Genus: Coleophora
- Species: C. glaucella

Binomial name
- Coleophora glaucella Walsingham, 1882

Species of moth

Coleophora glaucella is a moth of the family Coleophoridae. It is found in the United States, including California.

The larvae feed on the leaves of Arctostaphylos glauca. They create a spatulate leaf case.
