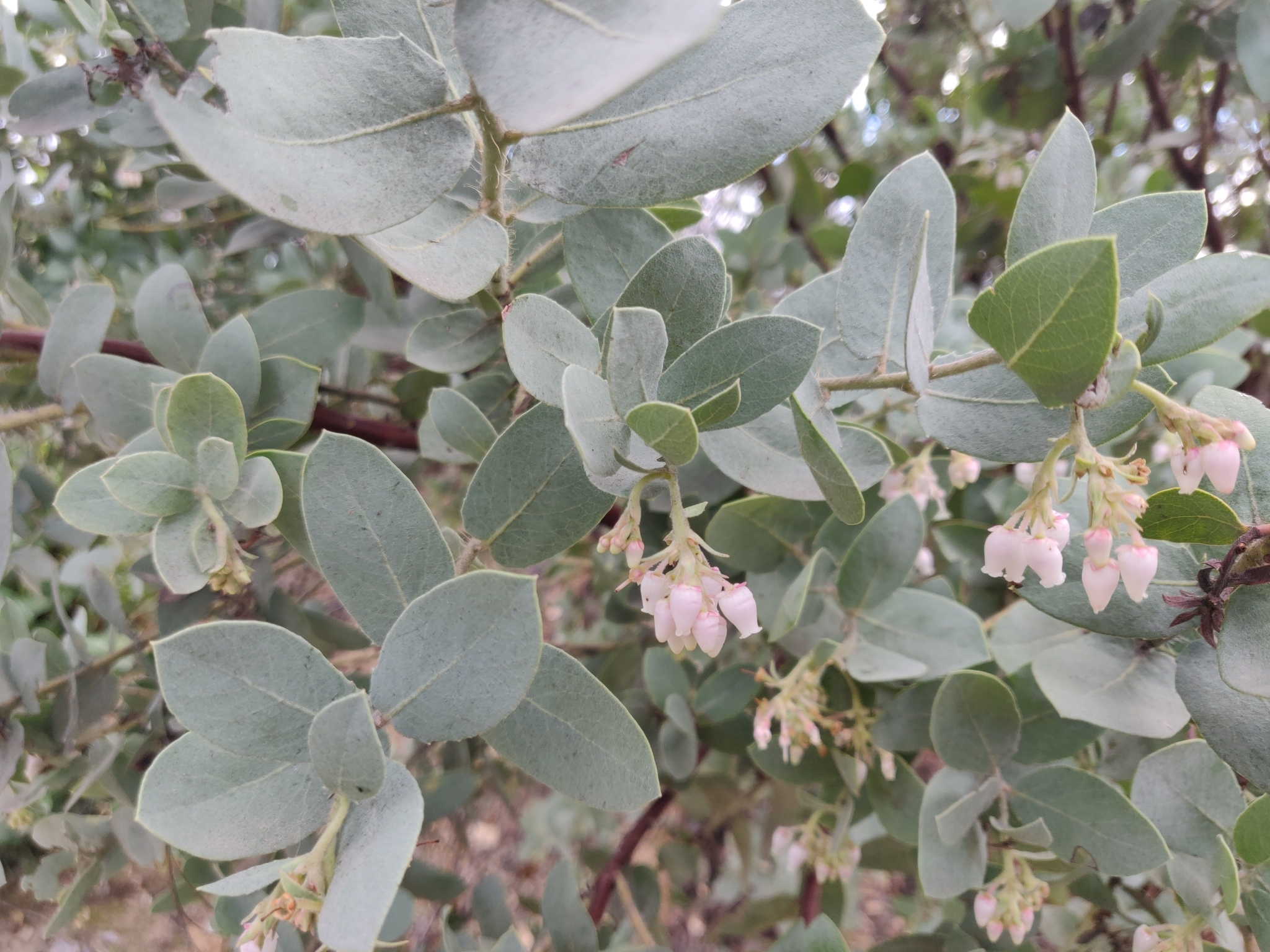

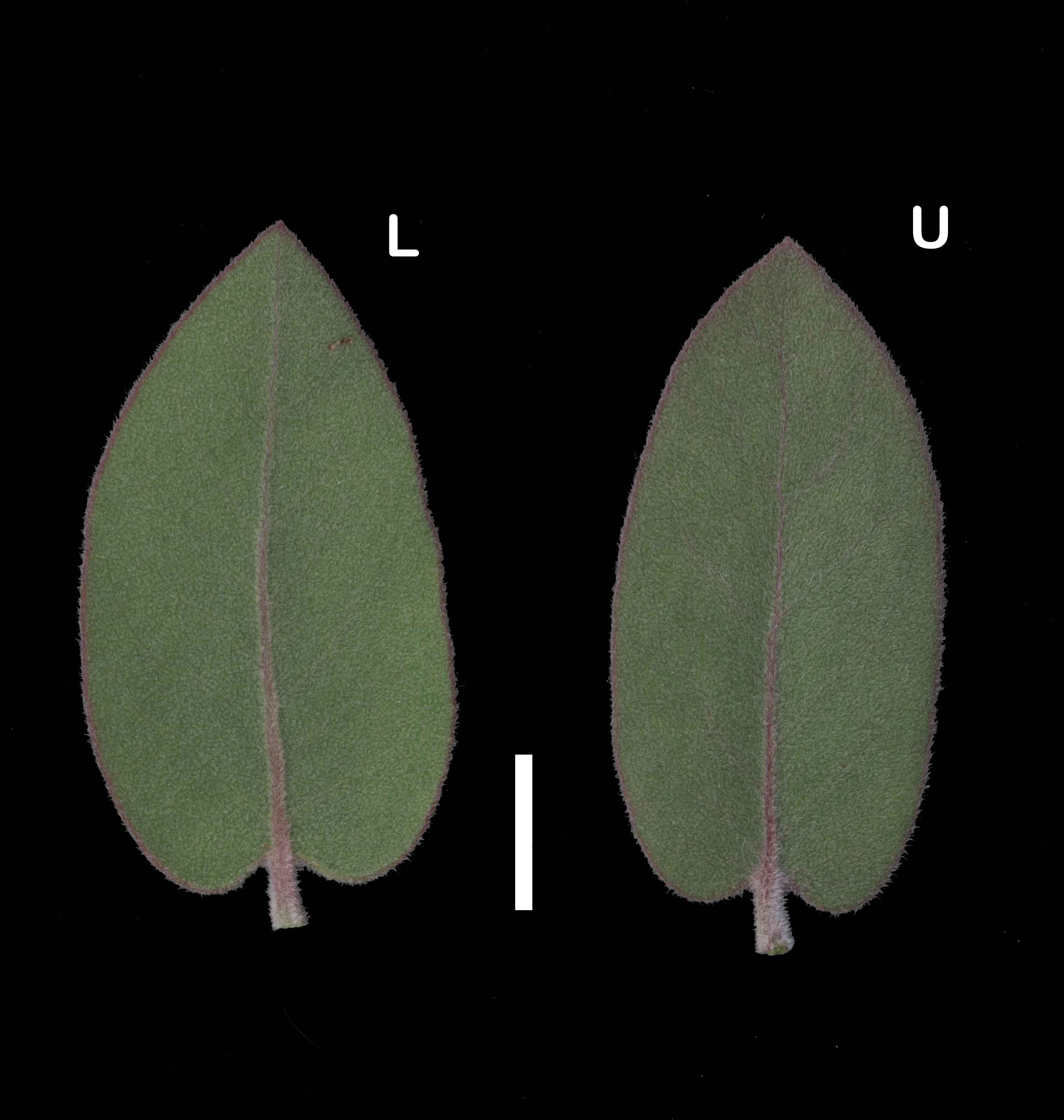
- Leaves of A. glutinosa (lower and upper views)

Conservation status
- Critically Imperiled (NatureServe)

Scientific classification
- Kingdom: Plantae
- Clade: Tracheophytes
- Clade: Angiosperms
- Clade: Eudicots
- Clade: Asterids
- Order: Ericales
- Family: Ericaceae
- Genus: Arctostaphylos
- Species: A. glutinosa

Binomial name
- Arctostaphylos glutinosa Schreib.

= Arctostaphylos glutinosa =

Species of flowering plant

Arctostaphylos glutinosa is a species of manzanita known by the common name Schreiber's manzanita. It is endemic to Santa Cruz County, California, where it is known from only a few occurrences on the western slopes of the Santa Cruz Mountains. It grows in the chaparral of the limestone and diatomaceous shale ridges on the coastline.

== Description ==
This is a bristly, glandular shrub reaching heights between 1 and 2 meters. The leaves are greenish gray, densely packed and clasping on the branches. They are up to 5 centimeters long, dull in texture and fuzzy to woolly, with mostly smooth edges except for some teeth near the bases.

The inflorescences are dense with urn-shaped flowers with reddish resin glands inside. The fruit is a hairy red drupe coated in sticky resin.
