= Arbutoideae =

- Arbutus menziesii

Scientific classification
- Kingdom: Plantae
- Clade: Embryophytes
- Clade: Tracheophytes
- Clade: Angiosperms
- Clade: Eudicots
- Clade: Asterids
- Order: Ericales
- Family: Ericaceae
- Subfamily: Arbutoideae; Nied.

Type genus
- Arbutus

Genera
- Arbutus; Arctostaphylos; Arctous; Comarostaphylis; Ornithostaphylos; Xylococcus

Subfamily of flowering plants in the heather family

The Arbutoideae are a subfamily in the plant family Ericaceae. Phylogenetic analysis supported all genera of the subfamily as monophyletic, except Arbutus. Moreover, it was suggested that the non-sister relationship between Mediterranean and North American species may be explained by a once widespread distribution in the Northern hemisphere before the Neogene.

The genera Arbutus, Arctostaphylos, Comarostaphylis form a particular type of mycorrhizal symbiosis with the fungus, Arbutoid mycorrhiza, which resembles ectomycorrhizas.

== Genera list ==
Image	Genus	Living species
	Arbutus L.	Species / Common name / Range; andrachne / Greek strawberry tree / Mediterranean and Middle East; canariensis / Canary madrone / Canary Islands of Spain; pavarii / / Libya: Jebel Akhdar range in coastal Cyrenaica; unedo / Strawberry tree / Europe, north Africa, Middle East; arizonica / Arizona madrone / Mexico, southwestern United States; bicolor / .; madrensis / / Mexico: Durango, Jalisco, Nayarit, Sinaloa; menziesii / Pacific madrone / Coastal areas of British Columbia, Washington, Oregon, California; Sierra Nevada; mollis / / Mexico; occidentalis / / western Mexico; tessellata / . / northern and central Mexico from Chihuahua to Jalisco, Tlaxcala, and Veracruz; xalapensis / Texas madrone / Central American, Mexico, southwestern United States
	Arctostaphylos Adans.	Subgenus Micrococcus; Sect. Micrococcus; Species / Common name / Range; mendocinoensis / Pygmy manzanita; myrtifolia / Ione manzanita / California (Amador, Calaveras Counties); nissenana / Nissenan manzanita / California (coastal and inland ranges north of San Francisco Bay); nummularia / Glossyleaf manzanita / California (Mendocino County); Subgenus Arctostaphylos, which has 3 sections: Sect. Arctostaphylos; Species / Common name / Range; alpina / Alpine bearberry; bakeri / Baker's manzanita / California (Sonoma County); densiflora / Sonoma manzanita / California (Sonoma County); edmundsii / Little Sur manzanita / California (Monterey County); franciscana / Franciscan manzanita / California (San Francisco County); gabrielensis / San Gabriel manzanita / California (Los Angeles County); glauca / Bigberry manzanita / California and Baja California; hispidula / Gasquet manzanita / Coastal mountain ranges of southern Oregon and northern California; hookeri / Hooker's manzanita / California; insularis / Island manzanita / California (Santa Cruz Island); klamathensis / Klamath manzanita / California (Klamath Mountains); manzanita / Common manzanita, whiteleaf manzanita / California (Coast Ranges and Sierra Nevada foothills); mewukka / Indian manzanita / California (Sierra Nevada); nevadensis / Pinemat manzanita / California; parryana / Parry manzanita / California (southern); patula / Greenleaf manzanita / Western North America; pumila / Sandmat manzanita / California (Monterey County); pungens / Pointleaf manzanita / Southwestern United States and to northern and central Mexico; rudis / Shagbark manzanita / California (southern central coast); stanfordiana / Stanford's manzanita / California (Outer North Coast Ranges north of the San Francisco Bay Area); uva-ursi / Bearberry / Europe, Asia, North America; viscida / Sticky manzanita, whiteleaf manzanita / California and Oregon; Sect. Foliobracteata; Species / Common name / Range; andersonii / Santa Cruz manzanita / Santa Cruz Mountains (CA); auriculata / Mount Diablo manzanita / Mount Diablo (CA); canescens / Hoary manzanita / Coastal ranges of SW OR and N CA; catalinae / Santa Catalina Island manzanita / Santa Catalina Island (CA); columbiana / Hairy manzanita / West coast from N. CA to S. BC; confertiflora / Santa Rosa Island manzanita / Santa Rosa Island (CA); cruzensis / La Cruz manzanita / Monterey and San Luis Obispo counties (CA); glandulosa / Eastwood manzanita / Coastal slops from OR, CA, Baja California; glutinosa / Schreiber's manzanita / Santa Cruz County (CA); hooveri / Hoover's manzanita / Santa Lucia Mountains (CA); imbricata / San Bruno Mountain manzanita / San Bruno Mountain (CA); luciana / Santa Lucia manzanita / southern Santa Lucia Mountains (CA); malloryi / Mallory's manzanita / Inner North Coast Ranges west and northwest of the Sacramento Valley (CA); montaraensis / Montara manzanita / San Bruno Mountain and Montara Mountain (CA); montereyensis / Monterey manzanita / Monterey County (CA); morroensis / Morro manzanita / Morro Bay (CA); nortensis / Del Norte manzanita / Del Norte County (CA), Curry County (OR), Josephine County (OR); obispoensis / Serpentine manzanita / Southern Santa Lucia Mountains (CA); osoensis / Oso manzanita / Los Osos Valley (San Luis Obispo, CA); otayensis / Otay manzanita / San Diego County (CA); pajaroensis / Pajaro manzanita / Monterey County, Santa Cruz County, San Benito County (CA); pallida / Pallid manzanita; pechoensis / Pecho manzanita; pilosula / La Panzo manzanita; purissima / La Purissima manzanita; refugioensis / Refugio manzanita; regismontana / Kings Mountain manzanita; silvicola / Bonny Doon manzanita; tomentosa / Woolyleaf manzanita; virgata / Bolinas manzanita; viridissima / Whitehair manzanita; wellsii / Wells' manzanita; Sect. Pictobracteata; Species / Common name / Range; pringlei / Pringle manzanita; Unassigned; Species / Common name / Range; rainbowensis / Rainbow manzanita; gabilanensis / Gabilan manzanita; ohloneana / Ohlone manzanita
	Arctous (A.Gray) Nied.	Species / Common name / Range; alpina (L.) Nied.; microphyllus C.Y.Wu; ruber (Rehder & E.H.Wilson) Nakai
	Comarostaphylis Zucc.	Species / Common name / Range; arbutoides; discolor; diversifolia; glaucescens; lanata; longifolia; mucronata; polifolia; sharpii; spinulosa
	Ornithostaphylos Small	Species / Common name / Range; oppositifolia / Baja birdbush
	Xylococcus Nutt.	Species / Common name / Range; bicolor / Mission manzanita
