= Manzanita =

Common name for many species of genus Arctostaphylos

See also Arctostaphylos

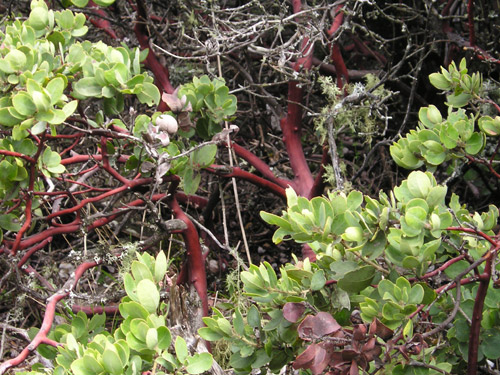
Manzanita branches with red bark

Manzanita is a common name for many species of the genus Arctostaphylos. They are evergreen shrubs or small trees present in the chaparral biome of western North America, where they occur from Southern British Columbia and Washington to Oregon, California, Utah, Arizona, New Mexico, and Texas in the United States, and throughout Mexico. Manzanitas can live in places with poor soil and little water. They are characterized by smooth orange or red bark and stiff, twisting branches. There are 107 species and subspecies of manzanita, 95 of which are found in the Mediterranean climate and colder mountainous regions of California, ranging from ground-hugging coastal and mountain species to small trees up to 20 feet (6m) tall. Manzanitas bloom from winter to early spring and carry berries in spring and summer. The berries and flowers of most species are edible.

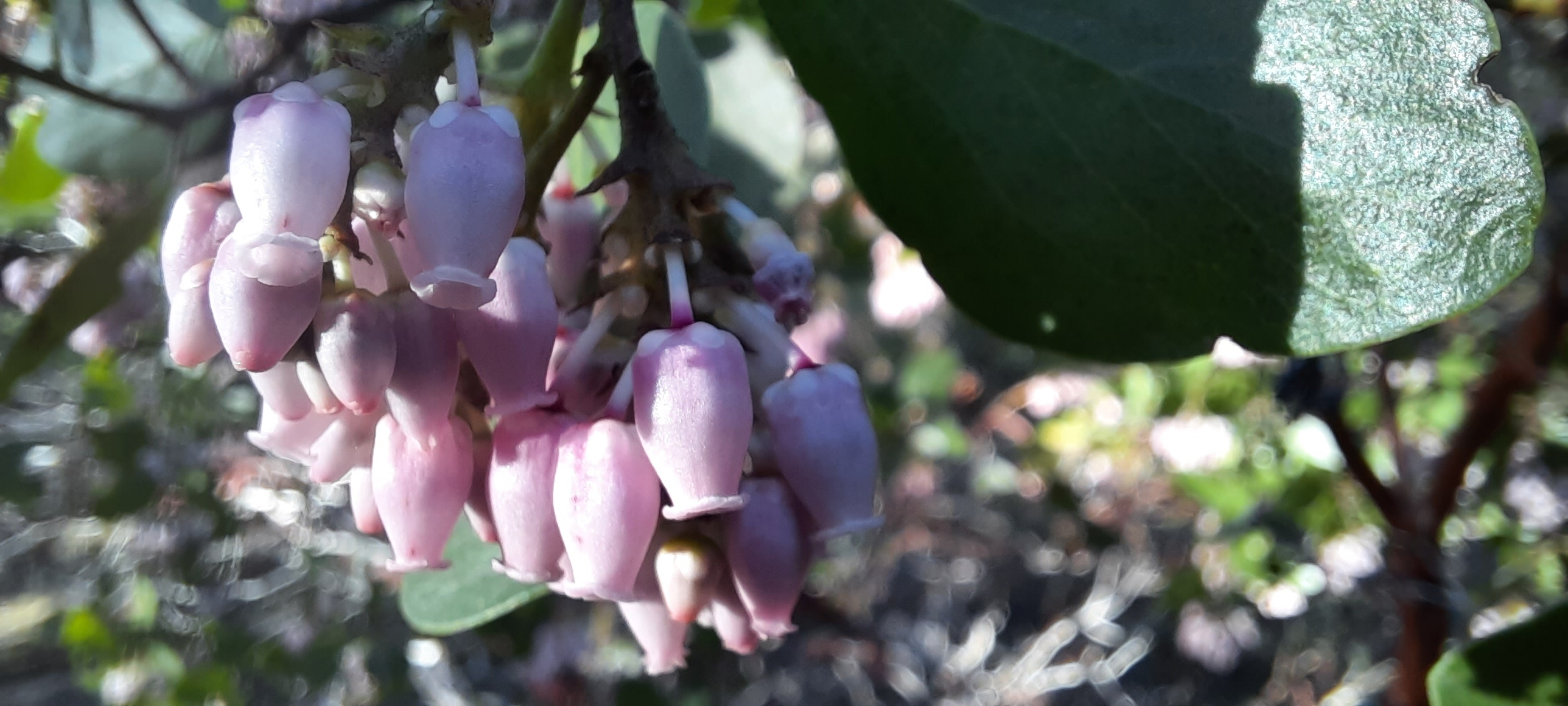
Manzanita flowers

The word manzanita is the Spanish diminutive of manzana meaning "little apple". The name manzanita is also sometimes used to refer to species in the related genus Arbutus, which is known by that name in the Canadian area of the tree's range, but is more usually known as madroño, or madrone in the United States.

== Uses ==
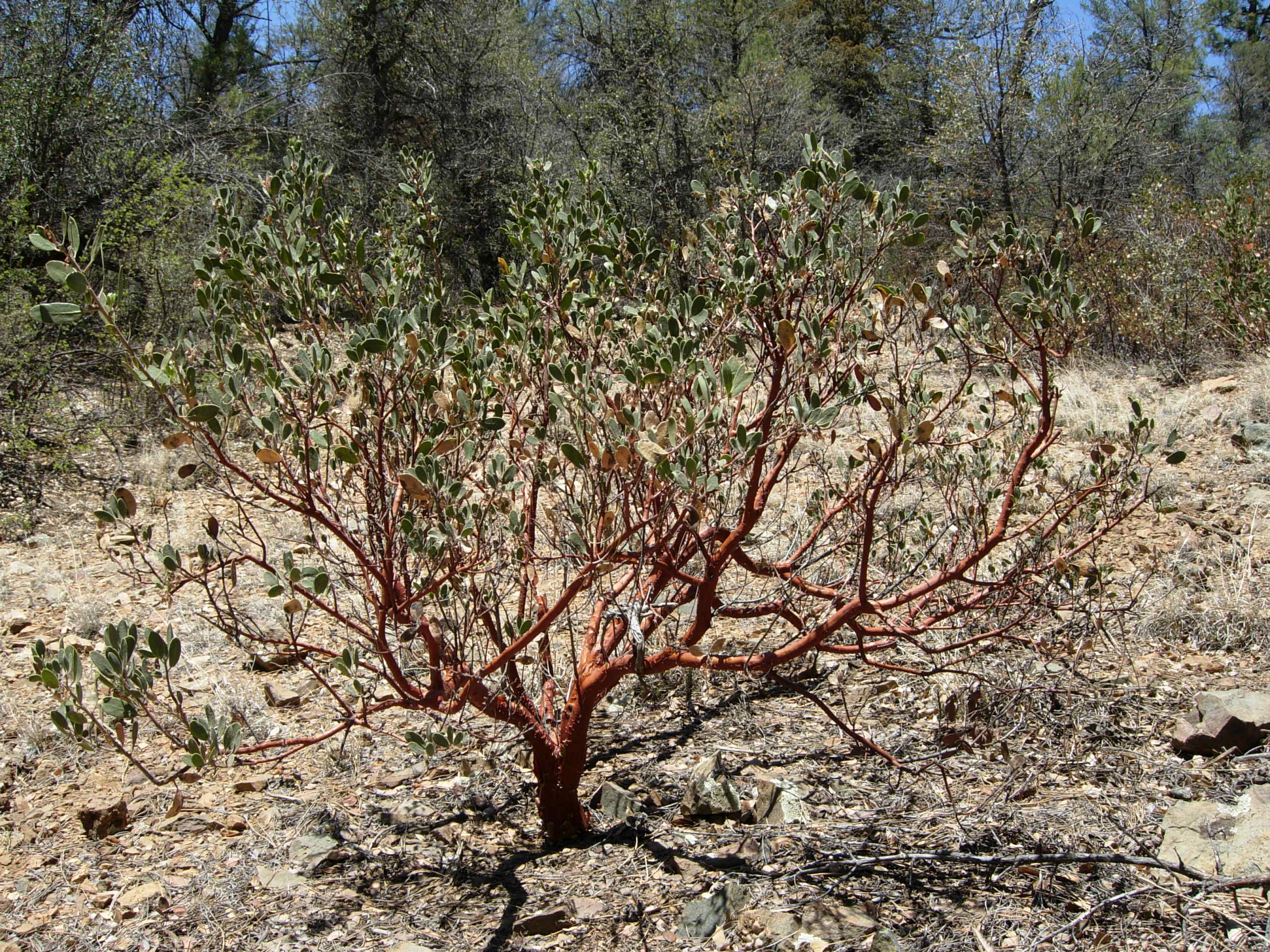
A manzanita bush

=== Folk medicine ===
Native Americans in Northern California make a tisane from manzanita leaves to treat poison oak rash. The leaves contain chemicals with a mildly disinfectant quality and can be used for mild urinary tract infections.

The tree's berries can be turned into a cider by mashing, pouring an equal amount of water over the paste, and then straining it. In Native American cultures, this cider is then used to treat stomach ailments and promote appetite. The berries have also been used to treat bronchitis and kidney problems.

The leaves of the manzanita also have many medicinal purposes. Chewing the leaves of the manzanita tree into a poultice can treat open sores and ease headaches after application. Chewing on the leaves, without ingestion, can cure stomach issues such as cramps and aches. Infusions of the leaves can also treat ailments such as diarrhea and severe colds.

=== Culinary use ===
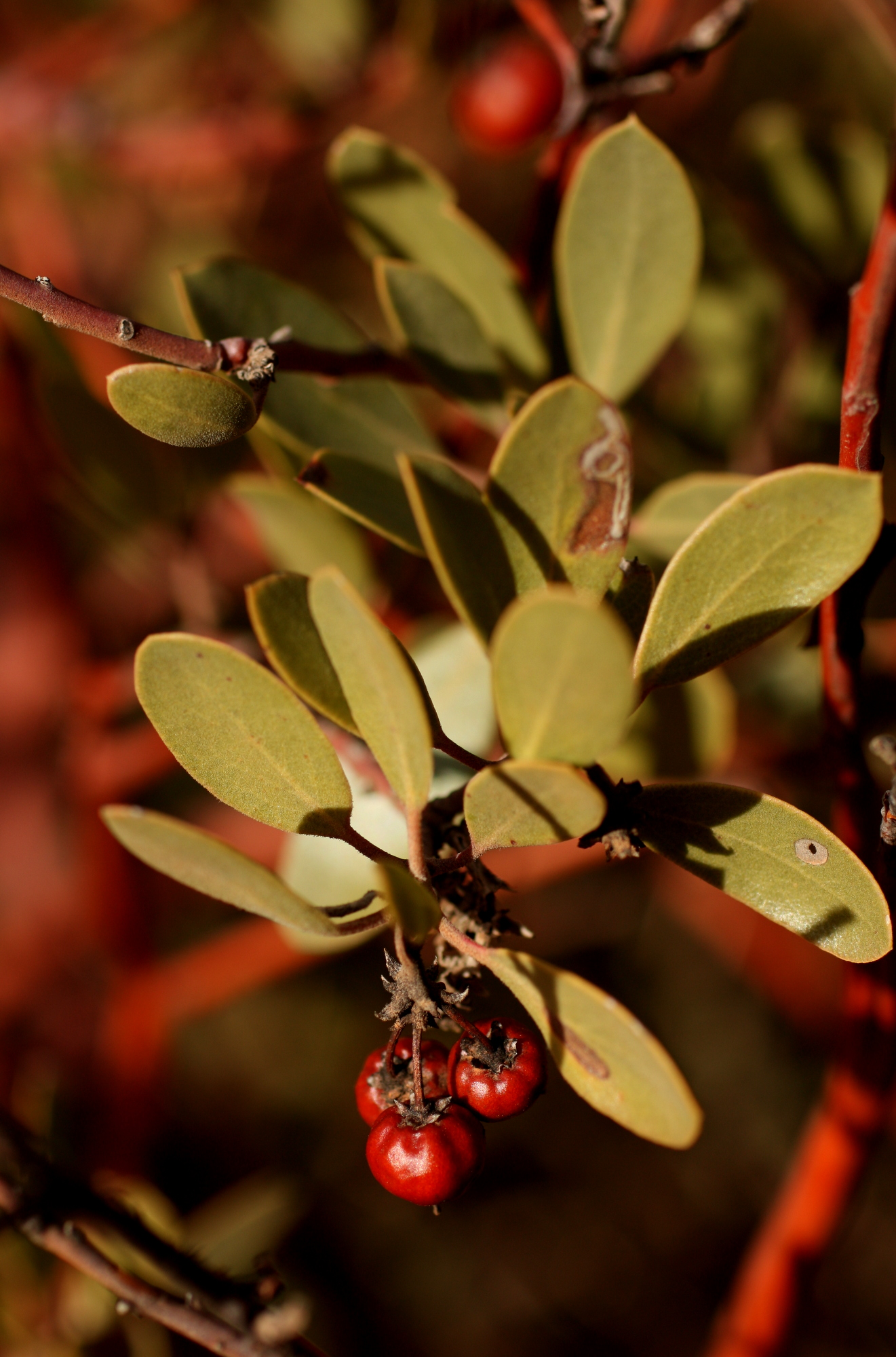
Manzanita berries

The berries are edible, and can be harvested en masse and stored. Once stored and dried, the berries can be ground into a coarse meal. The berries can be eaten ripe (when red) or green for a slightly sour taste. They are good eaten alone or used as a thickener or sweetener in other dishes. Native Americans use the fresh berries to make cider and use the leaves as toothbrushes.

=== Landscape use ===
Manzanitas are useful as ornamental plants in gardens in the western United States and similar climate zones. They are evergreen, highly drought-tolerant, have picturesque bark and attractive flowers and berries, and occur in many sizes and growth patterns.

Arctostaphylos columbiana, for example, is hardy enough for highway landscaping in western Oregon and Washington. A. 'Emerald Carpet', A. uva-ursi (the bearberry), and other low-growing manzanitas are valuable evergreen groundcovers for dry slopes. Larger varieties, such as A. 'Dr. Hurd', can be grown as individual specimens and pruned to emphasize the striking pattern and colors of the branches. They prefer light, well-drained soil, although the low-growing ground covers will tolerate heavier soils.

=== Decorative use ===
Manzanita branches are popular as decoration due to their unique shape, color, and strength when dried. Florists sometimes use them as centerpieces at wedding receptions and other events, often adding hanging votive candles, beaded gems, and small flowers.

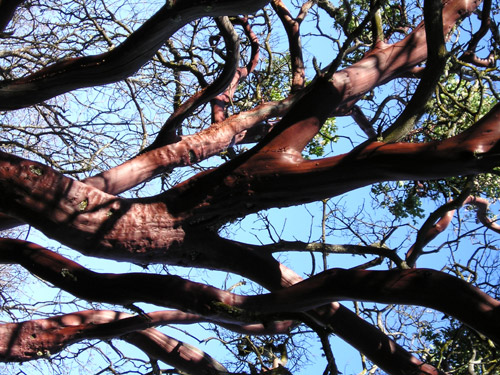
Manzanita bark

The wood is notoriously hard to cure, mostly due to cracking against the grain, giving it few uses as lumber. The slow growth rate and many branchings further decrease the sizes available. Some furniture and art employ whole round branches, which reduces cracking and preserves the deep red color.

The dead wood decays slowly and can last for many years, on and off the plant. Sunlight smooths and bleaches manzanita to light grey or white, rendering it superficially akin to animal bones. Because of this and the stunted growth of many species, manzanita is often collected in its more unusual shapes, giving it the nickname "mountain driftwood".

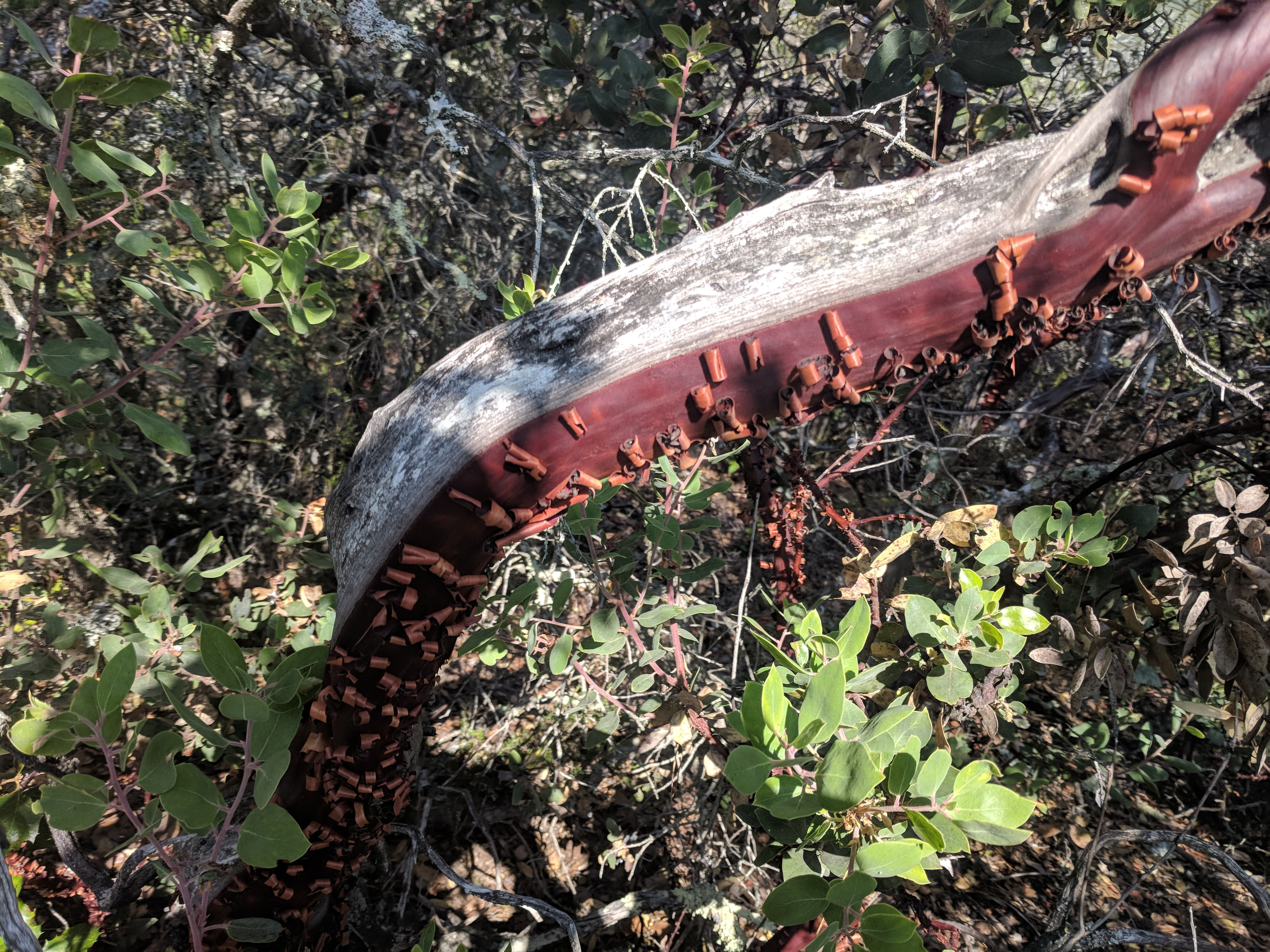
Manzanita bark peeling off in small curls

Manzanita wood is also used as perches for parrots and other large pet birds. The branches of the larger species are extremely long-lasting for this purpose.

Some aquarium keepers use sandblasted manzanita as driftwood in planted aquaria because of its attractive forked growth and its chemical neutrality. It holds up well over extended periods of submersion if properly cleaned and cured. The wood is also resistant to the leaching of tannins into the water column, a problem often found with other aquarium driftwoods. When used as driftwood, manzanita must usually be weighted down for several weeks or soaked first to counteract the wood's natural buoyancy when dried and cured. The green wood does not float.

Manzanita wood, when dry, is excellent for burning in a campfire, barbecue, fireplace, or stove. It is dense and burns at a high temperature for long periods. However, caution should be exercised because the high temperatures can damage thin-walled barbecues and even crack cast iron stoves or cause chimney fires.

=== Other uses ===
During World War II, manzanita root burls were used as a suitable native material to make smoking pipes due to its relation and similar fire-resistant properties to then-unavailable imported briar. It was labeled as "mission briar" and harvested for the remainder of the war, stopping soon after when supplies of imported briar once again became available.

== Rarity and endemics ==
Some manzanita species are among the rarest plants in the world.

Arctostaphylos montana ravenii (Presidio manzanita), an endemic species, is the most endangered and restricted plant in the mainland United States. In 1987 only one specimen remained at a secret location in the Presidio of San Francisco National Historic Landmark District in San Francisco, California. This plant has since been successfully cloned.

Arctostaphylos franciscana (Franciscan manzanita), a species native to San Francisco, had not been seen growing wild since 1947 until it was spotted growing in the Presidio of San Francisco in October 2009. Caltrans transplanted this specimen on 23 January 2010 to make way for the Doyle Drive Replacement Project. Transplanting costs were funded in part by Federal Highways Administration, Caltrans, The Presidio of San Francisco, and private donors. Arctostaphylos hookeri, subspecies franciscana, a scrubby, thin-twigged bush, riddled with the webs of miniature spiders, resides in a corner of the California section of The Strybing Arboretum.

An as yet unclassified and unidentified manzanita found growing on San Francisco's Parker Avenue presents a test case for San Francisco's landmark tree ordinance.

Arctostaphylos gabrielensis is a "critically imperiled" species of manzanita endemic to a tiny area in the San Gabriel Mountains, in Los Angeles County, California.

== Genus evolution ==
Genus evolution is relatively recent, but in C. Michael Hogan's tracing of the evolutionary history of the genus, he states: "convergent evolution patterns appear to complicate cladistic constructions for certain portions of the genus cladogram. In any case, fossil ancestors of the genus Arctostaphylos have been suggested to have occurred in the Middle Miocene, with modern species beginning to take shape in the Late Tertiary."

== Ecology ==
The manzanita leaf gall aphid and the manzanita butter clump fungus are two known ecological associates of this type of tree. The flowers attract native bee species including Osmia and the black-tailed bumblebee. The fungus Exobasidium arctostaphyli induces witch's broom galls on manzanita.

== See also ==
- Artemisia californica (California sagebrush)
- Chamise
- Baccharis pilularis (coyote brush)
- Bearberry
- Arctostaphylos
- Category: Arctostaphylos
- Xylococcus bicolor (mission manzanita)
- Manzanita conk
