= CNPS Inventory of Rare and Endangered Plants of California =

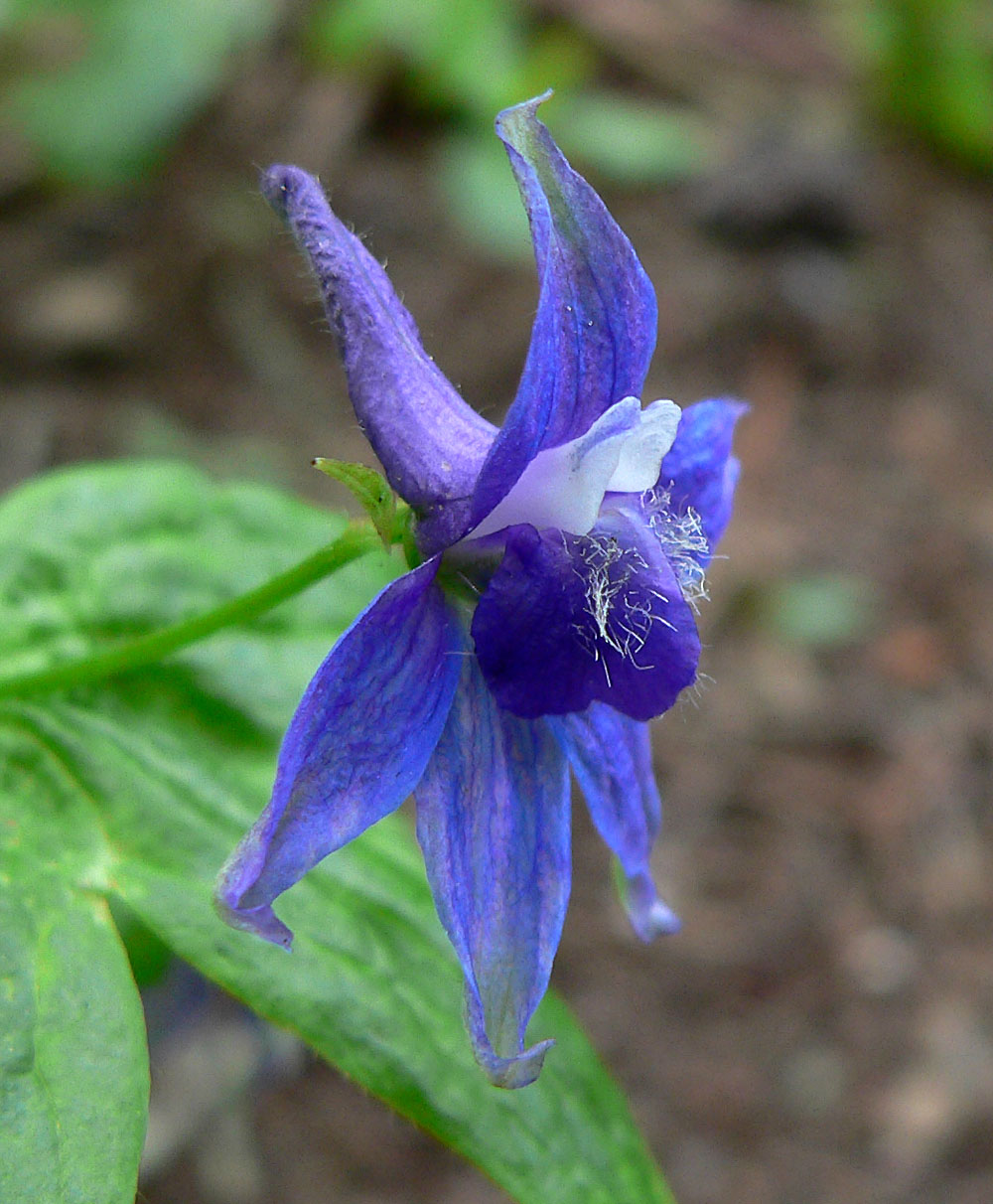
Endangered Delphinium bakeri, Baker's larkspur.

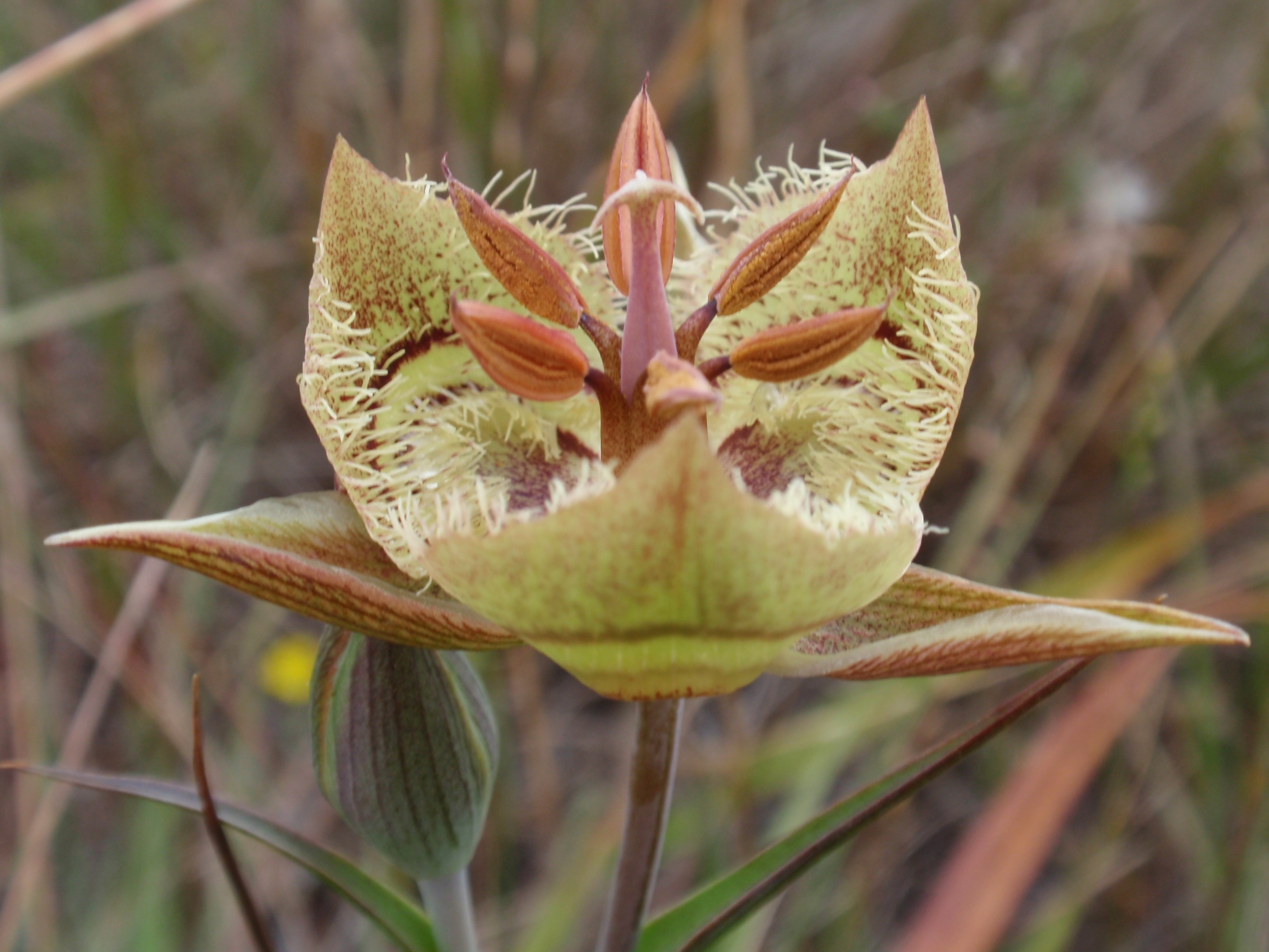
Critically endangered Calochortus tiburonensis, Tiburon mariposa lily.

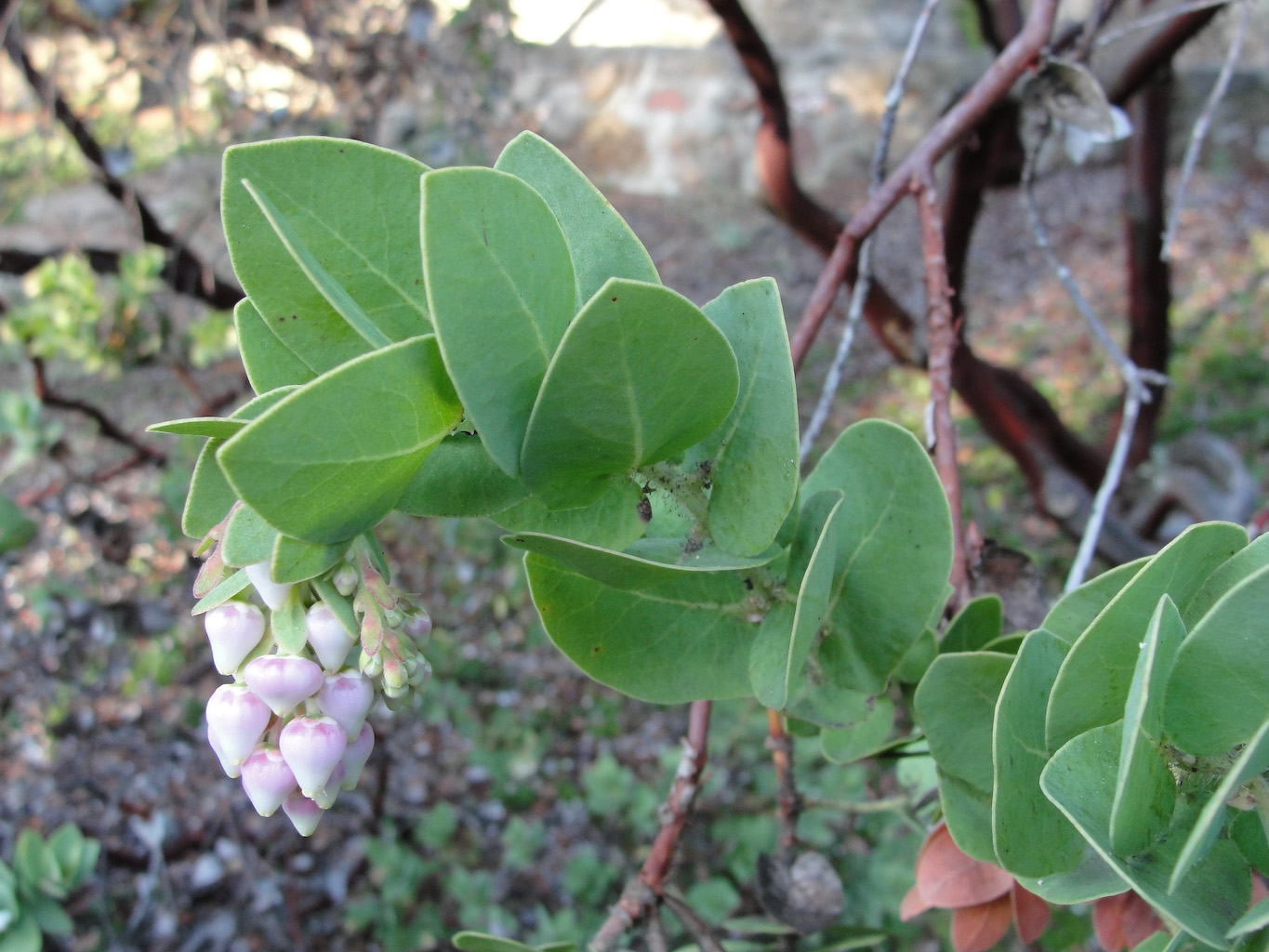
Endangered Arctostaphylos refugioensis, Refugio manzanita.

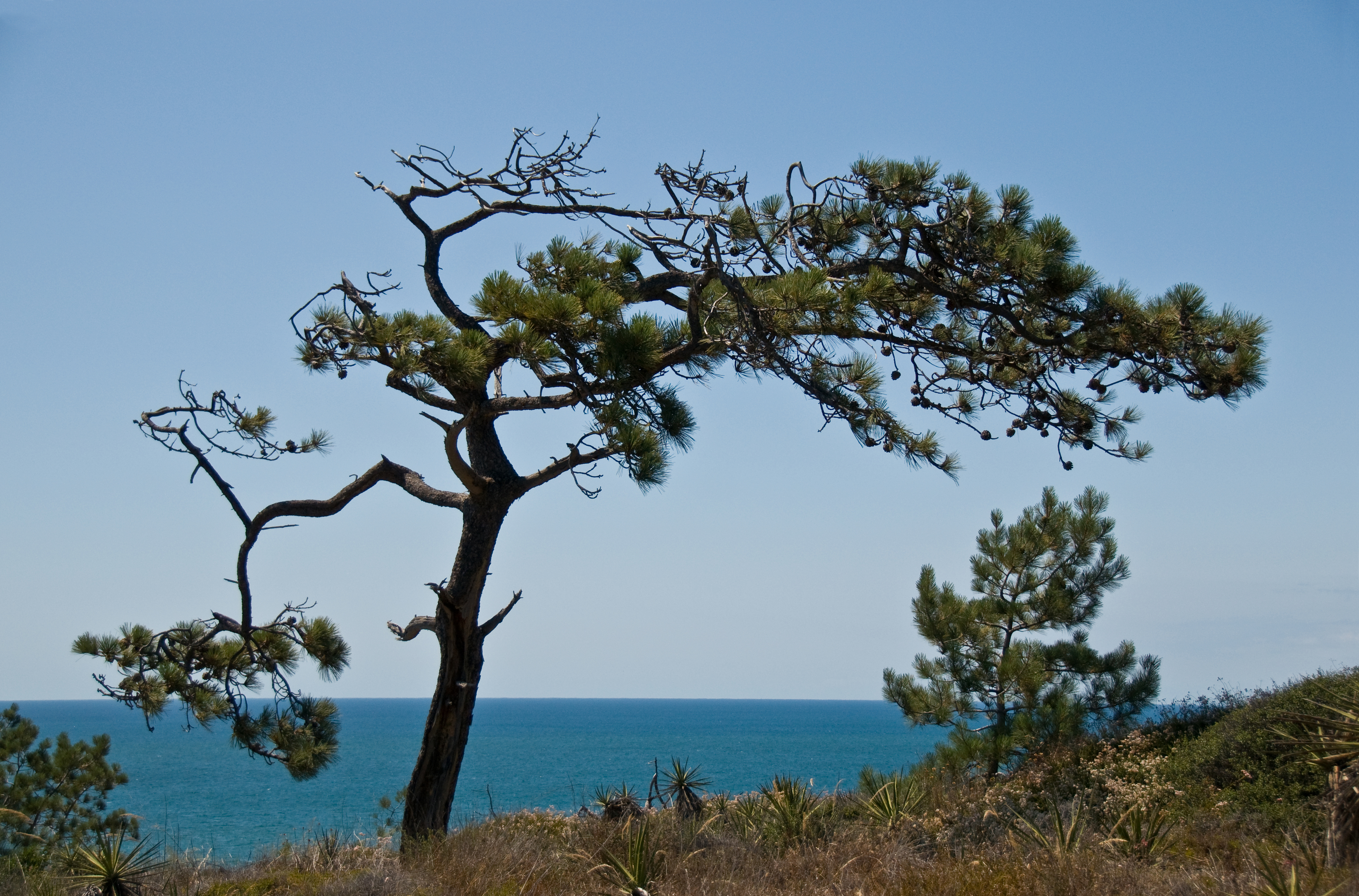
Endangered Pinus torreyana, Torrey pine.

The CNPS Inventory of Rare and Endangered Plants of California is a botanical online database providing information on rare, threatened, and endangered California native plants. It is sponsored by the California Native Plant Society (CNPS).

== Description ==
All plant taxa that the State of California or U.S. Fish and Wildlife Service list as being threatened species, endangered species, or rare species in California, are included in the lists. They are continually updated with additions, changes, and deletions. In 2014 the CNPS Rare Plant Program began including Lichens of Conservation Concern.

The Inventory is published every three to five years and is used by the State and Federal government for conservation planning. It is used for scientific research, conservation and preservation, and enforcement of environmental laws in California.

== History ==
CNPS originally developed the Inventory of Rare and Endangered Plants of California with the guidance of botanist and evolutionary biologist G. Ledyard Stebbins.

The 1st Edition was printed in 1974. The last print version, the 6th Edition, was published in 2001. The 8th Edition, released in 2010 with ongoing updates, is the current database.

The online database publication, which depends on volunteer contributions, is supported by the California Native Plant Society, University of California, Riverside Herbarium, and other institutions, organizations, and individuals.

== Rare Plant Ranks ==
The CNPS Inventory of Rare and Endangered Plants of California contains a ranking system to systematically categorize levels of rarity for California native plant species. The system comprises two types of rankings: "rare plant" and "threat" ranks.

The rare plant ranks include:

- 1A – presumed extinct or extirpated in California; rare or extinct elsewhere.
- 1B – rare, threatened, or endangered throughout range.
- 2A – presumed extirpated in California with known common populations elsewhere.
- 2B – rare, threatened or endangered in California with known common populations elsewhere.
- 3 – on review list; more information needed.
- 4 – on watch list; limited distribution.

Threat ranks (specific to California populations) include:

- 0.1 – seriously threatened.
- 0.2 – moderately threatened.
- 0.3 – not very threatened.

== See also ==
- Flora of California by conservation status
- List of California native plants
- Endemic flora of California
- Flora of California
