= Ohlone (disambiguation) =

Ohlone typically refers to the Ohlone people.

Ohlone may also refer to:

- Ohlone languages
- Ohlone mythology
- Ohlone/Chynoweth (VTA), light rail route
- Ohlone/Chynoweth–Almaden (VTA), light rail route
- Ohlone College, a community college located in Fremont, California
- Ohlone Greenway, a pedestrian and bicycle path in the East Bay region of the San Francisco Bay Area
- Ohlone manzanita, Arctostaphylos ohloneana
- Ohlone Wilderness, a regional part in California
- Ohlone tiger beetle
