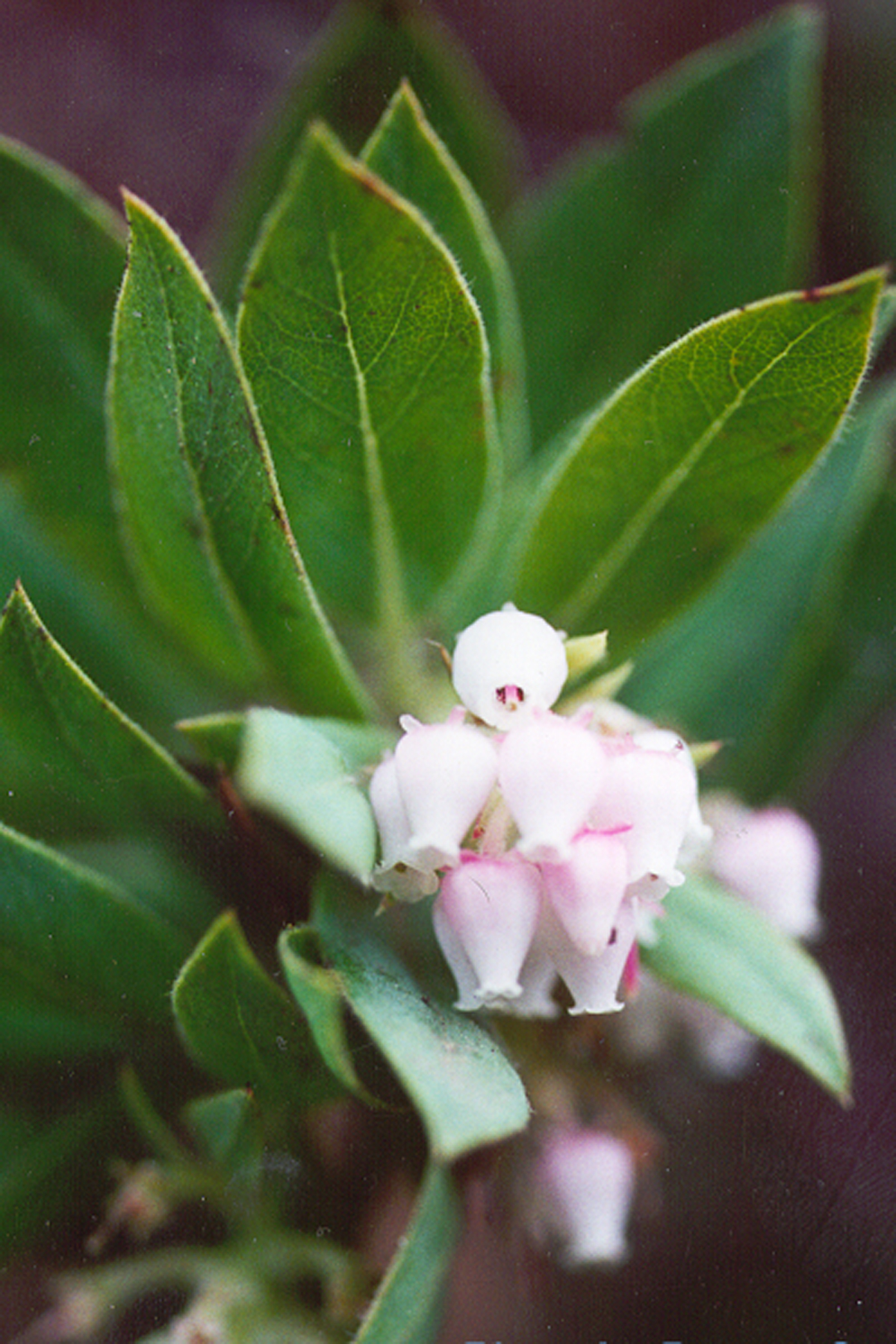

Conservation status
- Imperiled (NatureServe)

Scientific classification
- Kingdom: Plantae
- Clade: Tracheophytes
- Clade: Angiosperms
- Clade: Eudicots
- Clade: Asterids
- Order: Ericales
- Family: Ericaceae
- Genus: Arctostaphylos
- Species: A. virgata

Binomial name
- Arctostaphylos virgata Eastw.

= Arctostaphylos virgata =

Species of tree

Arctostaphylos virgata is a species of manzanita known by the common names Bolinas manzanita and Marin manzanita.

== Distribution ==
It is endemic to Marin County, California, where it is known from only about 20 occurrences in the forests and chaparral of the coastal hills. It is a dominant shrub in some spots in the maritime chaparral plant community at Point Reyes National Seashore. Like many other species in this type of plant community, it is dependent on wildfire and its survival is threatened by fire suppression.

== Description ==
Arctostaphylos virgata is a large shrub, reaching at least two meters tall and known to exceed 5 meters in height, becoming treelike. Its twisted branches are covered in deep red bark. The smaller twigs are coated in woolly fibers and studded with glandular bristles which exude sticky resins. The shiny green leaves are rough and sticky in texture, oval to widely lance-shaped, and up to 5 centimeters long. The inflorescence is a dense cluster of urn-shaped manzanita flowers. The fruit is a sticky, bristly drupe about 6-8 millimeters wide.

== See also ==
- Fire ecology
- Arctostaphylos
- Manzanita
- Point Reyes National Seashore
