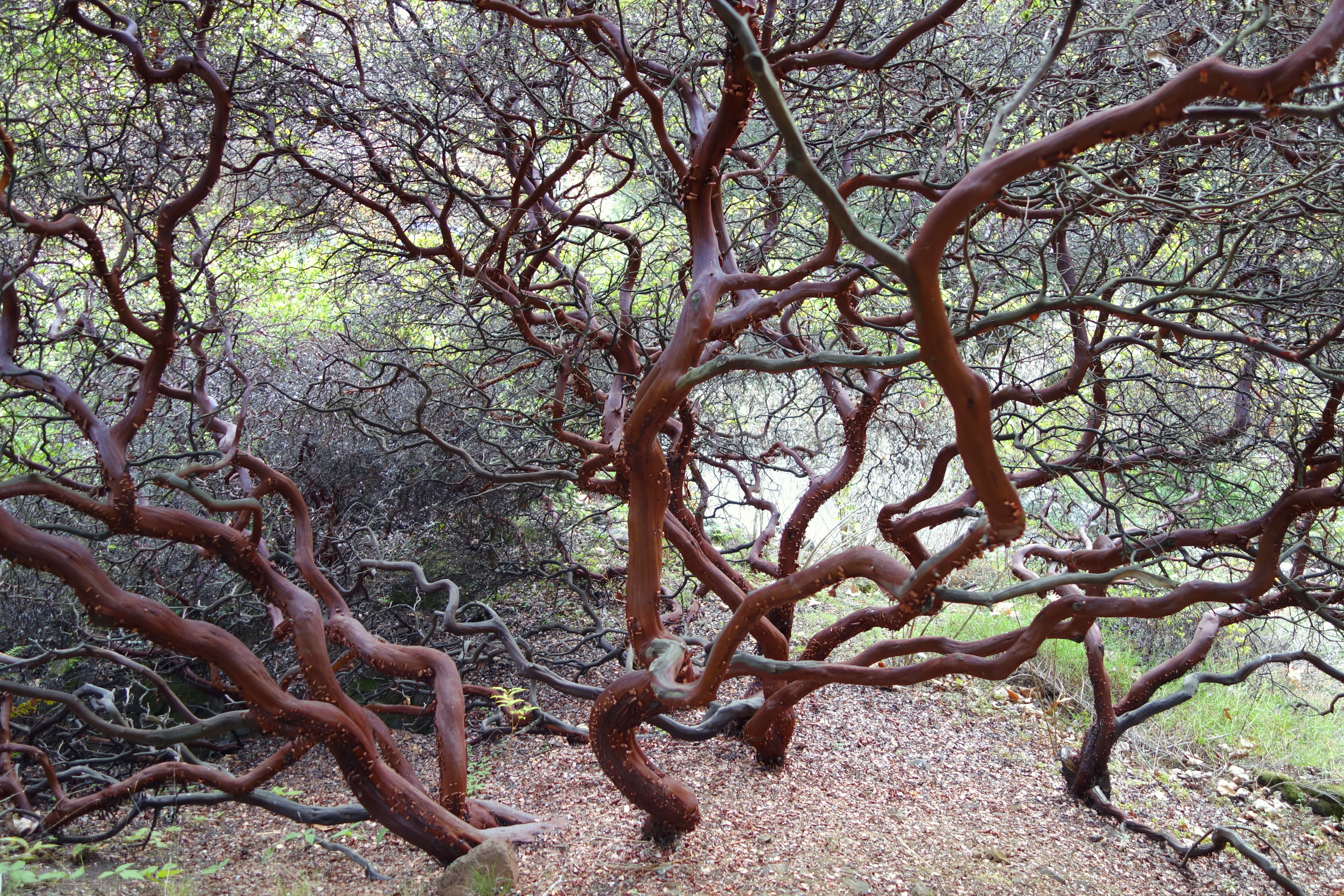

Conservation status
- Imperiled (NatureServe)

Scientific classification
- Kingdom: Plantae
- Clade: Tracheophytes
- Clade: Angiosperms
- Clade: Eudicots
- Clade: Asterids
- Order: Ericales
- Family: Ericaceae
- Genus: Arctostaphylos
- Species: A. purissima

Binomial name
- Arctostaphylos purissima P.V.Wells

= Arctostaphylos purissima =

Species of flowering plant

Arctostaphylos purissima is a rare species of manzanita known by the common name La Purisima manzanita.

== Distribution ==
The plant is endemic to western Santa Barbara County, California, including in the Santa Ynez Mountains and near Lompoc and the location of Mission La Purísima Concepción.

It is a plant of the Coastal sage scrub chaparral habitats, on sandstone soils.

Due to its limited distribution, it is currently listed under the California Rare Plant Ranking 1B.1 (Rare, threatened, or endangered in California or elsewhere; Seriously threatened in California).

== Description ==
Arctostaphylos purissima is a shrub reaching at least 1 metre (3.3 ft) in height, and known to exceed 4 metres (13 ft) tall. It varies in shape from low and spreading to tall and erect.

It is coated in long, white bristles and a dense foliage of shiny, hairless green leaves. Each leaf is round to oval in shape and smooth along the edges, and up to 2.5 centimeters long.

The inflorescence is a hanging cluster of spherical to urn-shaped manzanita flowers each about half a centimeter long.

The fruit is a hairless drupe between one half and one centimeter wide.
