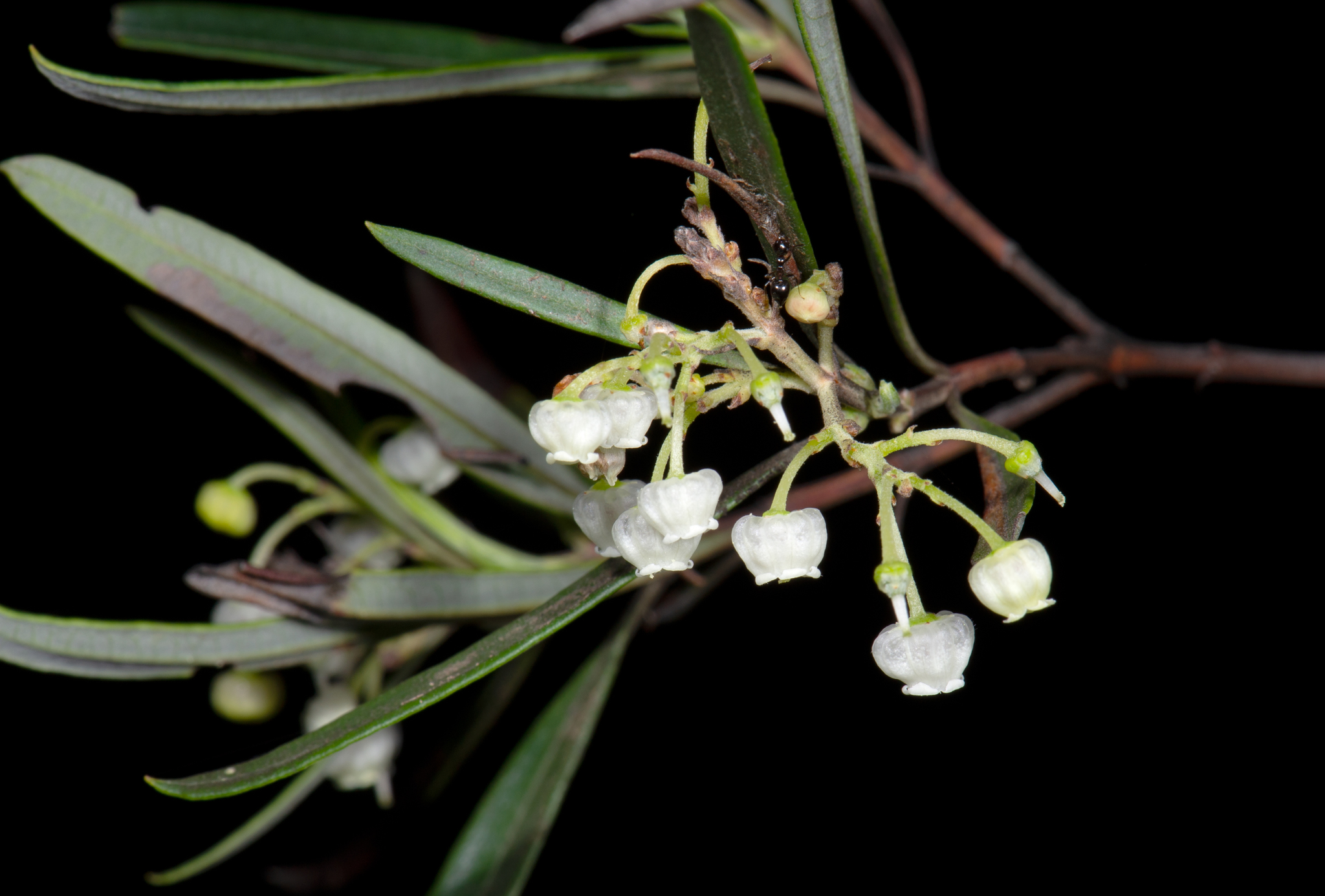

Conservation status
- Apparently Secure (NatureServe)

Scientific classification
- Kingdom: Plantae
- Clade: Tracheophytes
- Clade: Angiosperms
- Clade: Eudicots
- Clade: Asterids
- Order: Ericales
- Family: Ericaceae
- Subfamily: Arbutoideae
- Genus: Ornithostaphylos; Small
- Species: O. oppositifolia

Binomial name
- Ornithostaphylos oppositifolia (Parry) Small

Synonyms
- Arctostaphylos oppositifolia Parry; Arctostaphylos polifolia Torr.; Arctostaphylos salicifolia Parry

= Ornithostaphylos =

Genus of flowering plants

Ornithostaphylos is a monotypic plant genus which contains the single species Ornithostaphylos oppositifolia, commonly known as the Baja California birdbush or Baja California manzanita. A large, evergreen shrub in the heather family, this species is near-endemic to northwestern Baja California, with a small population just north of the border in San Ysidro, California. It produces a much-branched inflorescence of white, urn-shaped flowers, and has leathery leaves that appear opposite or in whorls. These characteristics separate it from its close relatives in the region, which include manzanitas (Arctostaphylos), summer holly (Comarostaphylis) and mission manzanita (Xylococcus).

== Description ==
A burl-forming, branched shrub to small tree up to 2 m tall, this species has thin, smooth bark that is colored reddish purple when young, sometimes found peeling off. The erect, rigidly branched stems may have minutely wooly hairs. The evergreen, leathery leaves are arranged opposite or whorled, and are up to 8 cm long to 6 mm wide. The margins of the leaves are rolled under, with the top side of the leaf a dark green and the underside white and hairy. The inflorescence is a panicle with 10 to 20 flowers, each suspended by a long pedicel. The fused petals form a white, urn-shaped flower, with 10 stamens and a 5-chambered ovary inside. The fruit is a spherical reddish-brown drupe with 5 stones, each stone containing 2 seeds.

== Distribution and habitat ==
This species is distributed throughout northwestern Baja California, Mexico and a small part of California in the United States. In Baja California, it is found from Tijuana south to the southern end of the Sierra de San Pedro Martir. In California, around 100 individuals are found growing north of the International Border on a single mesa near the Tijuana Hills.

Plants of this species make their home in the coastal chaparral, where they may form dense, nearly pure strands. The population in the United States is threatened by habitat fragmentation from the construction of roads, trails, and Border Patrol activities, such as "brush" clearing. Part of the known population was transplanted away to make room for the border fence, but their long-term survival is uncertain.

== Uses ==
A very slow growing, rare plant, this attractive small tree is well suited in gardens within its native area as a collector's or specimen plant. It is hardy down to 12 °F. It is drought-tolerant but does fine with occasional watering, enjoying well-draining to rocky soil.

== Gallery ==
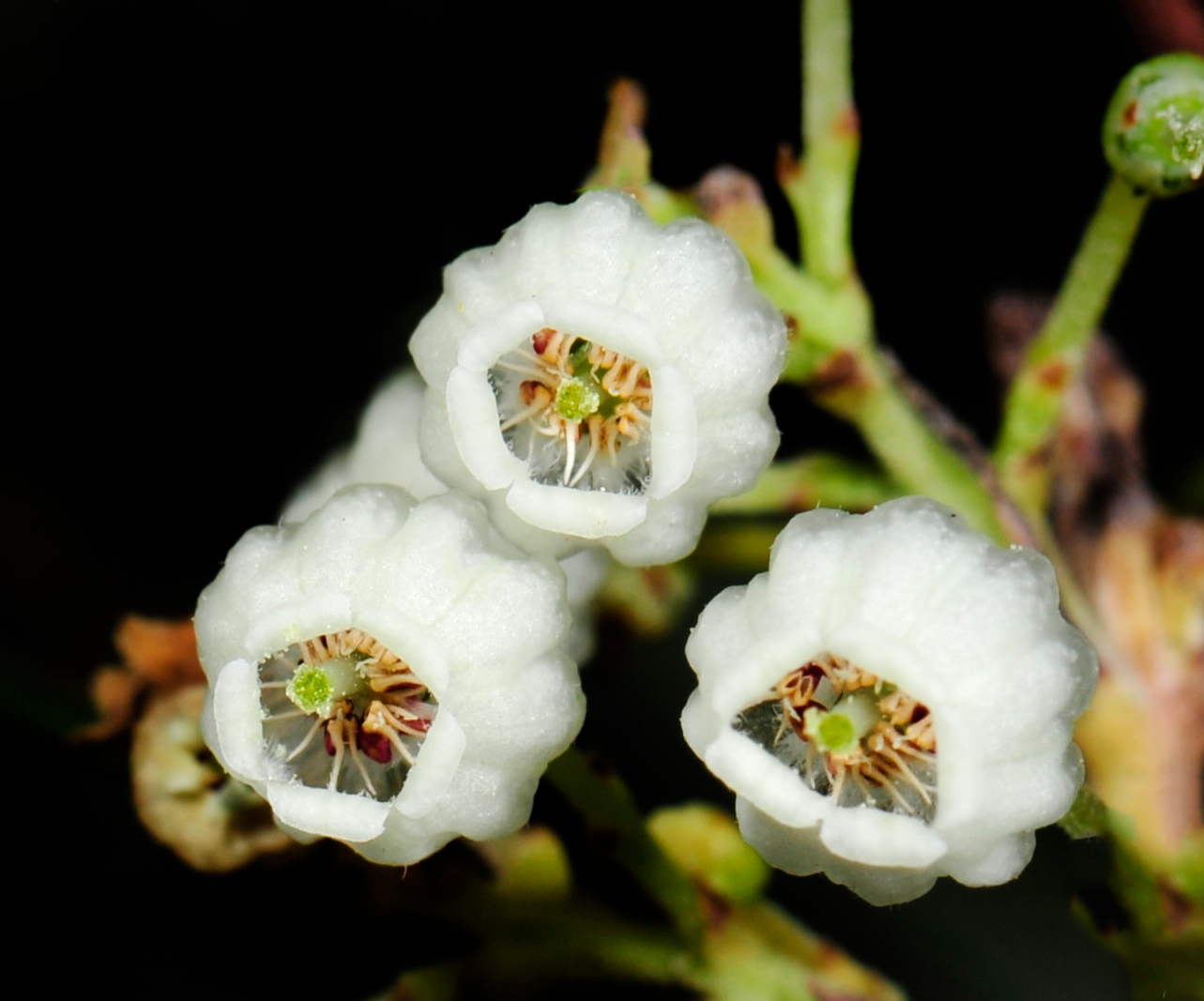
Detail of the flowers, with a view to their insides

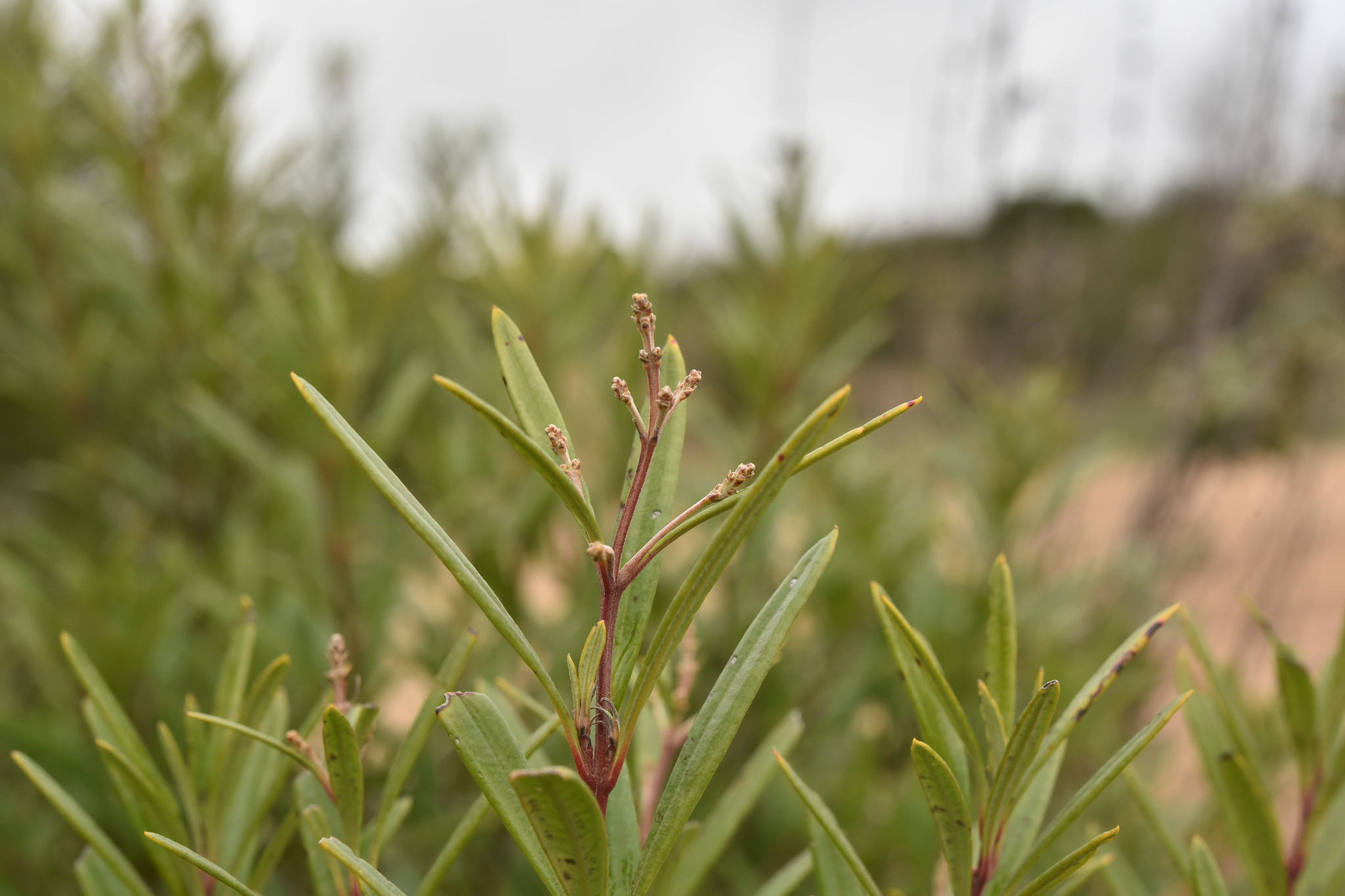
A nascent inflorescence with leaves

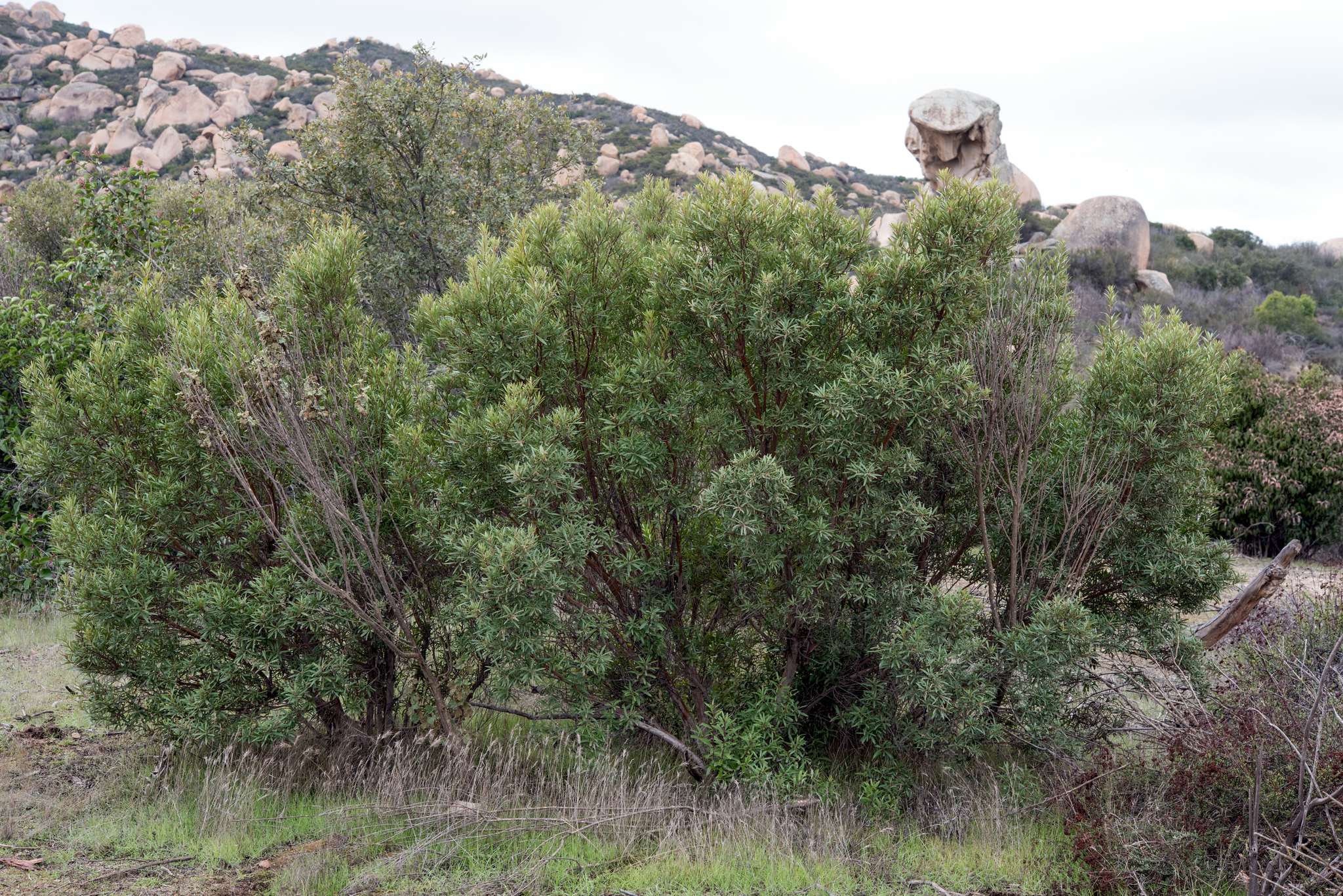
The plant in habitat

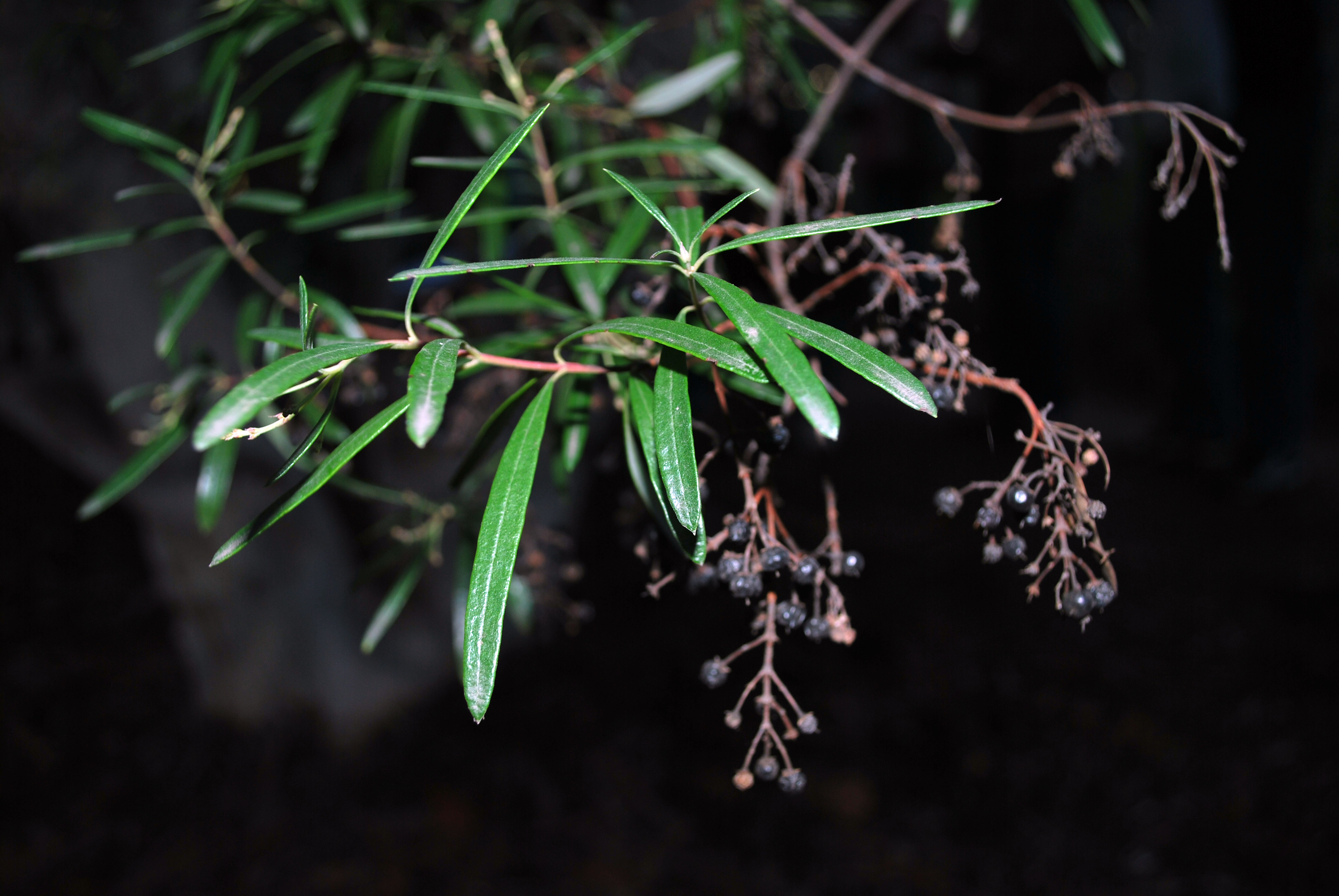
The old inflorescence with drupes

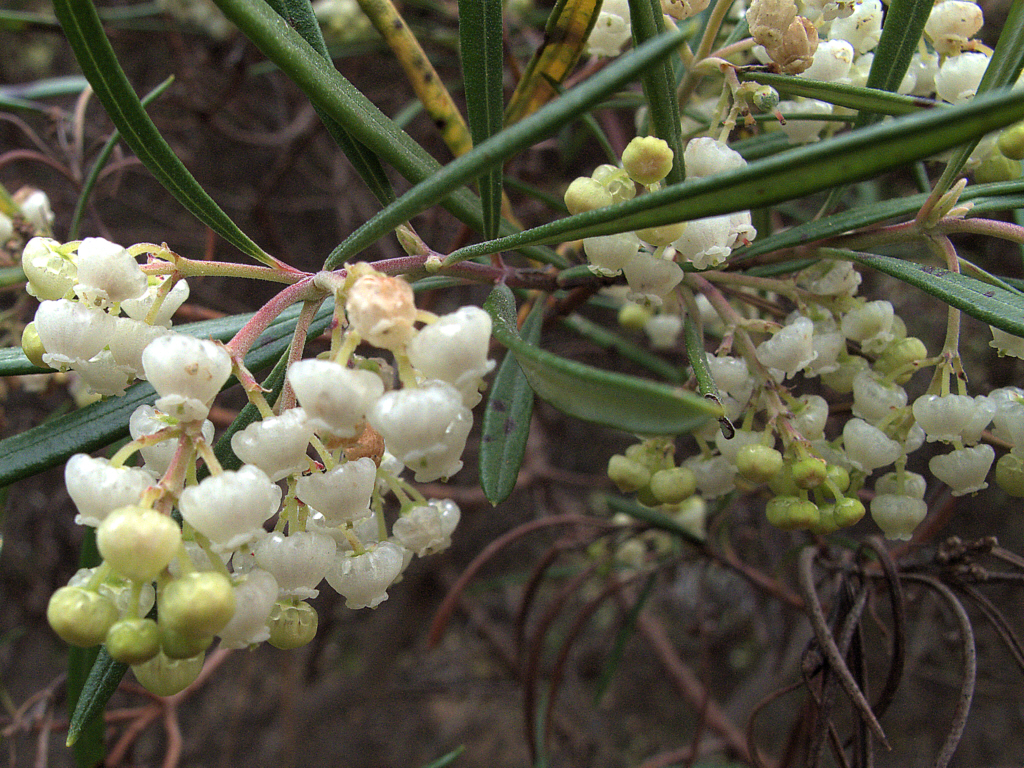
Flowering at the Regional Parks Botanic Garden
