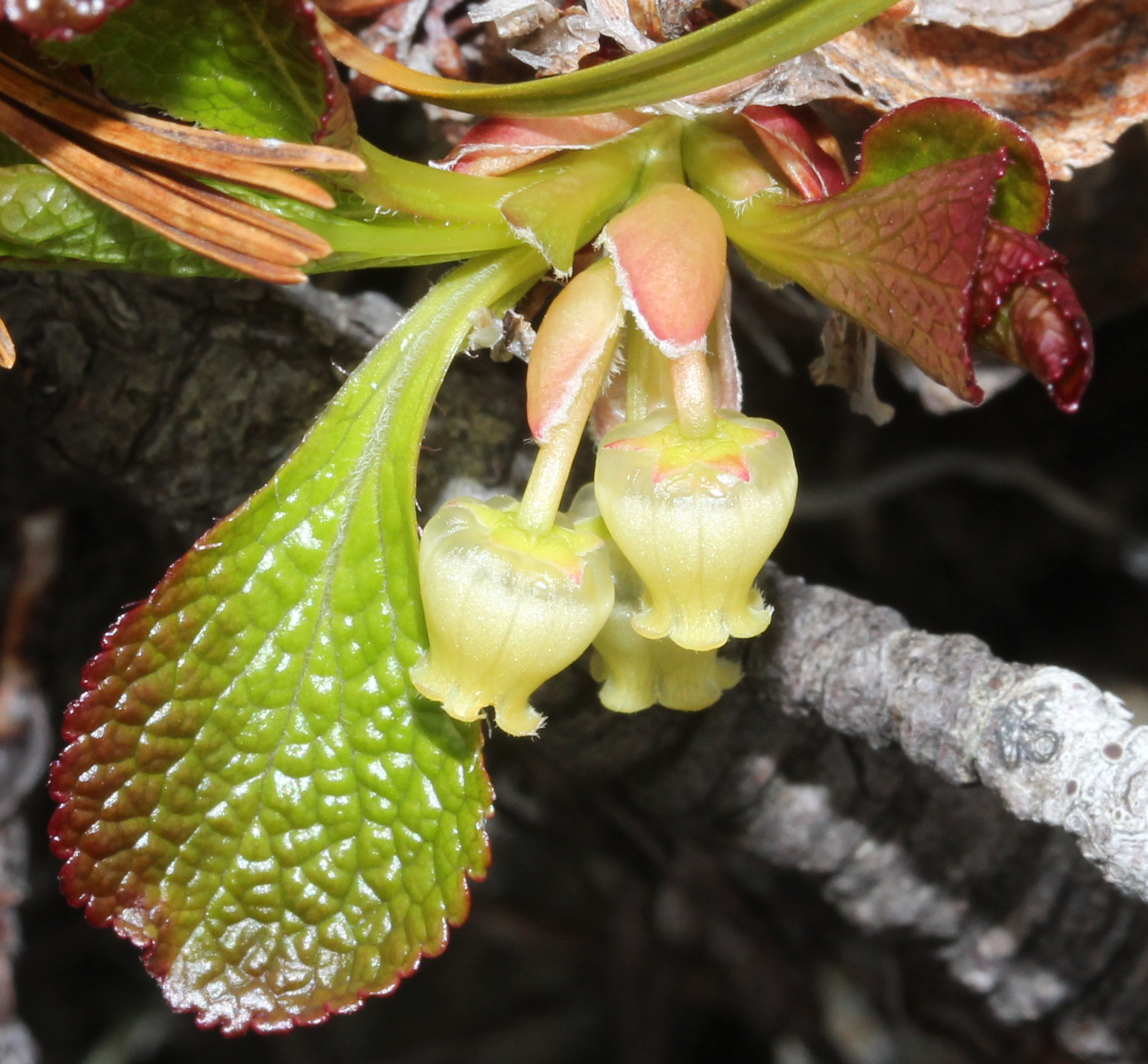
- Arctous alpina var. japonica

Scientific classification
- Kingdom: Plantae
- Clade: Tracheophytes
- Clade: Angiosperms
- Clade: Eudicots
- Clade: Asterids
- Order: Ericales
- Family: Ericaceae
- Subfamily: Arbutoideae
- Genus: Arctous; Nied. (1889)

= Arctous =

Genus of flowering plants

Arctous is a genus of flowering plants referred to by the common name "bearberry", a name sometimes shared with certain species of the related genus Arctostaphylos, in particular, A. uva-ursi. Although the two genera are related, certain characters, such as deciduous, marcescent leaves, rugose-reticulate venation, and finely-toothed leaves are more typical of Arctous than Arctostaphylos.

Three species are accepted.

- Arctous alpina (L.) Nied.
- Arctous microphylla C.Y.Wu
- Arctous rubra (Rehder & E.H.Wilson) Nakai
