= UC Riverside Herbarium =

Herbarium of the University of California, Riverside

The UCR Herbarium is a clearinghouse for information regarding plant species distribution in the Western Hemisphere. The collection houses over 110,000 dried specimens, approximately 80,000 of which are from the United States, and 32,000 from Mexico. The collection is especially strong in the flora of Southern California and the Baja California peninsula.

The Herbarium maintains an online-accessible Filemaker database of every specimen in the stacks, which is constantly updated. The Herbarium's staff makes between 5–10 thousand identifications a year for visitors who bring in plant samples, approximately 1/4 of which have been made into new specimens. In addition, the Herbarium's active collection program generates thousands of additional specimens a year. Current field projects include the flora of the San Bernardino Mountains and western Riverside County, as well as an investigation of the Curú Biological Reserve on the Nicoya Peninsula in Costa Rica.

The Herbarium is an active correspondent to the Inventory of Rare and Endangered Vascular Plants of California, a list of endangered plants published by the California Native Plant Society (CNPS). The Herbarium's records allow the CNPS to provide scientific evidence to support biological conservation, leading to the nomination of certain species for federal listing under the Endangered Species Act.
