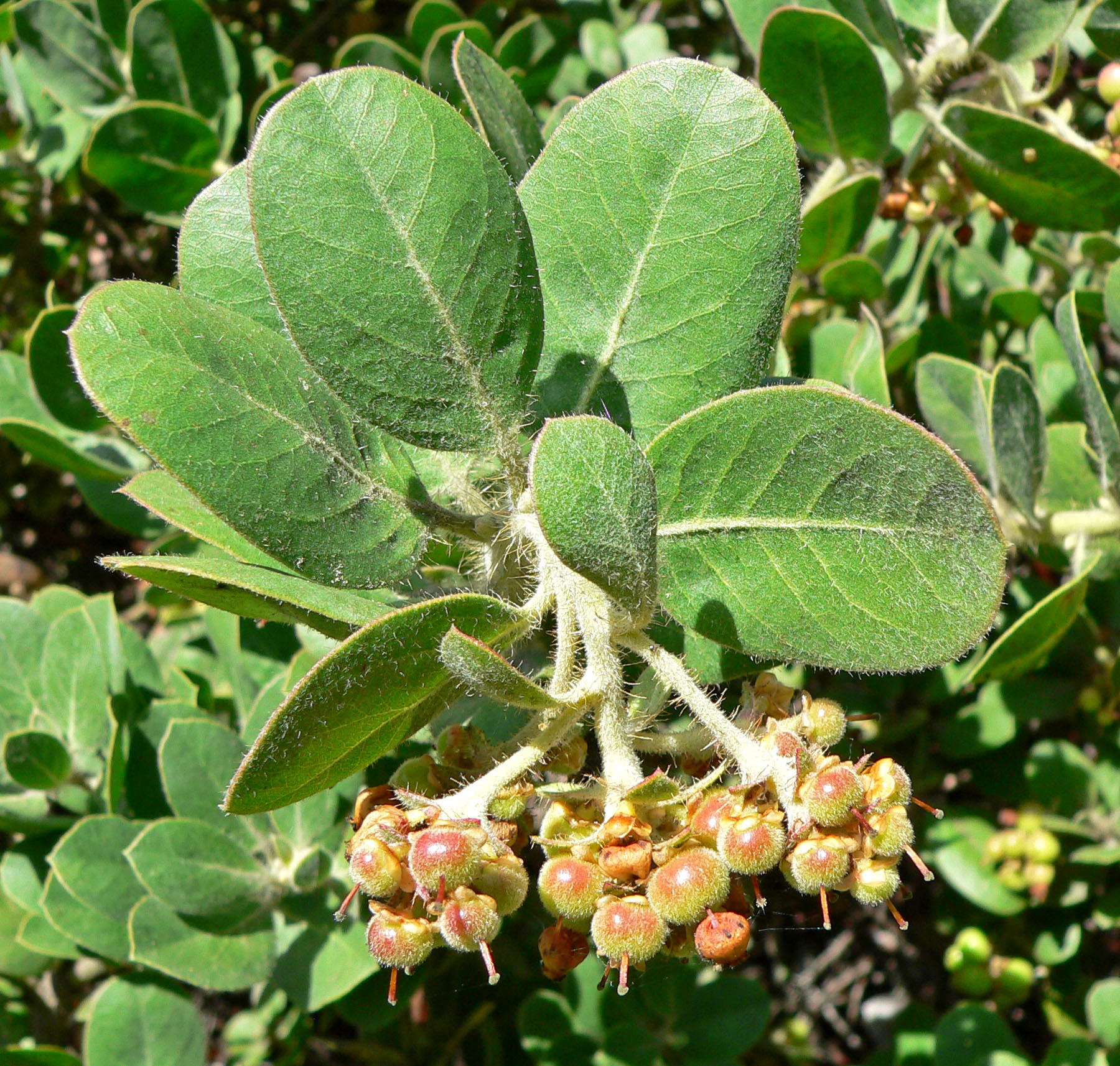

Conservation status
- Imperiled (NatureServe)

Scientific classification
- Kingdom: Plantae
- Clade: Tracheophytes
- Clade: Angiosperms
- Clade: Eudicots
- Clade: Asterids
- Order: Ericales
- Family: Ericaceae
- Genus: Arctostaphylos
- Species: A. confertiflora

Binomial name
- Arctostaphylos confertiflora Eastw.

= Arctostaphylos confertiflora =

Species of flowering plant

Arctostaphylos confertiflora is a rare species of manzanita known by the common name Santa Rosa Island manzanita. This shrub is endemic to California, where it grows on the sandstone bluffs of Santa Rosa Island in the Channel Islands. This manzanita is listed as an endangered species by the United States Government.

== Description ==
This is a small, twisting manzanita with blood red to gray bark and glandular bristles on its branches. The leaves are light, dull green, and hairy or bristly. The small flowers are rounded and milky white, less often pale pink, and bunched densely in inflorescences. The fruits are fuzzy drupes around 1 centimeter (0.4 in.) in diameter. The plant can grow to about 1.8 meters (6 ft.).

== Ecology ==
=== Pollinators ===
European Honeybees, bumblebees, and hummingbirds all pollinate the Santa Rosa Manzanita.

=== Habitat ===
The Santa Rosa Manzanita inhabits chaparral and conifer forest habitats on Santa Rosa Island. These areas have a usual climate of wet winters and dry summers. The habitat also experiences cyclic fire disturbance.

=== Range ===
The manzanita is found exclusively on Santa Rosa Island in the Channel Islands in California. The plants are found mainly on the eastern side of the island, where there are two sizable populations - one on Black Mountain and one on South Point. The Black Mountain population is the most significant. There are no accurate population estimates.

== Life History ==
The life history and reproductive processes of this species are unknown. However, due to the isolated nature of the island's endemic locations, the Santa Rosa Island Manzanita does not have the ability to have a widespread habitat. This leaves the species at risk to natural disasters, erosion, other forms of habitat loss, and predators. This caused a significant drop in the population until 2014, when the predators were removed from the island. Santa Rosa Manzanita seed germination is likely stimulated by fire. Seeds are then protected in the soil. The seeds can grow after fire or until another disturbance clears the undergrowth.

Individual plants can live for many years and bloom from January to April. They are perennial and die back during the rest of the year. The manzanita has a low reproductive success rate, resulting in very few young plants. Individual plants can live for 50 years or more.

== Conservation ==
The most recent population count comes from 2006, when it was estimated that 6,000-8,600 individual plants were on Santa Rosa Island. Monitoring data has suggested that population numbers have increased from 1990-2012, but this is not confirmed.

=== Historical and Current Distributions ===
The Santa Rosa Manzanita has only ever been found on Santa Rosa Island. Currently, the largest population is on Black Mountain, in the middle of the island. South Point, on the south coast of the island, also has a large part of the population. Because the plants live for so long, there is not enough long-term data to determine past population numbers.

=== Major Threats ===
Historically, the Santa Rosa Island Manzanita was most threatened by ranching on Santa Rosa Island. Animals grazed the plants and caused soil erosion. Between 1960-2014 all imported animals such as sheep, pigs, cattle, deer, and elk were removed from the island. Ranching no longer exists as a threat. Soil loss from non-animal erosion, such as rainfall, decrease the soil seed bank. Fire suppression efforts, which limit fire disturbance on the island, decreases potential germination. Due to the small population size, plants are vulnerable to random extinction. The Santa Rosa Island Manzanita is threatened by intense storms and longer, dryer droughts because of climate change. The plants are at risk from insect predation, but the extent of damage from this threat is unknown.

=== ESA Listing ===
The Santa Rosa Island Manzanita was ruled as “warranted but precluded” under the Endangered Species Act (ESA) in 1993. The ruling was reviewed in 1996. The Santa Rosa Manzanita was determined to be endangered under the ESA in 1997. The species is listed as endangered by the IUCN, and it does not appear that that status will change within the next five years.

==== 5-Year Review ====
The U.S. Fish and Wildlife Service still considers the Manzanita an endangered species as of 2021. Threats regarding climate change, soil loss, and insect predation are still being eliminated. In order to remedy the threat of soil loss, studies of the Santa Rosa Island’s seed bank and germination rates have been planned. With the removal of the imported mammals in 2014, the Fish and Wildlife Service removed the invasion of non-native mammal species as a threat.

==== Species Status Assessment ====
There is no official Species Status Assessment on the Santa Rosa Island Manzanita that has been conducted by the U.S. Fish and Wildlife Service.

=== Recovery Plan ===
There are plans to store Santa Rosa Island Manzanita seeds in the Center for Plant Conservation (CPC) seed bank. This is a storage facility for seeds that will ensure there are seeds to draw from if repopulation is necessary. The U.S. Fish and Wildlife service has plans to research how the plant germinates and propagates. Because little is known about how the plant reproduces, it is challenging to artificially produce new plants. The Fish and Wildlife Service wants to implement a fire management plan that will ensure there is enough disturbance to clear competing ground cover. Then seeds can grow while preserving seed banks. Erosion control is important in maintaining soil seed banks but is awaiting to be established. Generally, the population is in need of regular monitoring as it is unclear if the population is increasing, decreasing, or stable.
