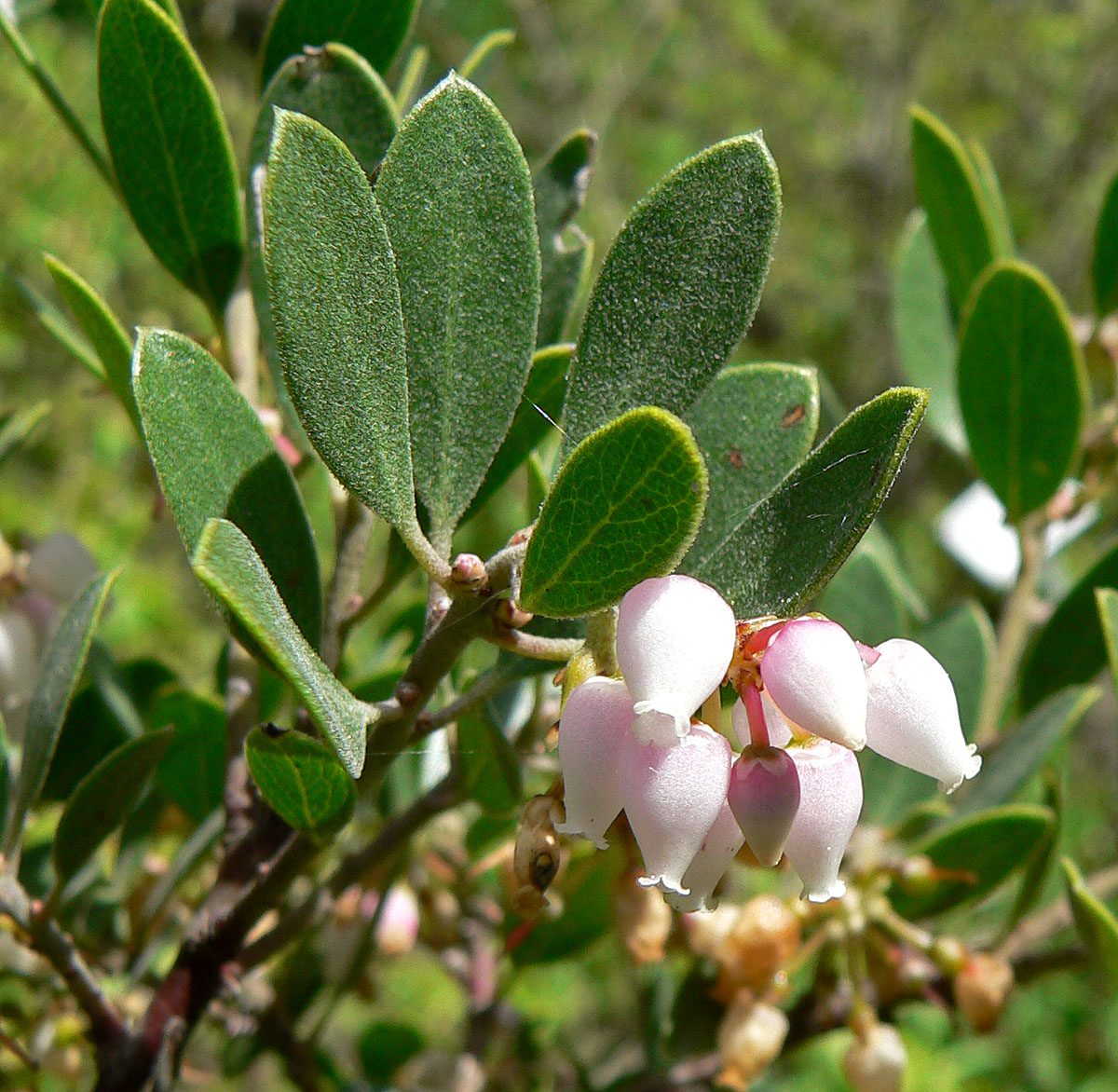

Conservation status
- Possibly Extinct (NatureServe)

Scientific classification
- Kingdom: Plantae
- Clade: Tracheophytes
- Clade: Angiosperms
- Clade: Eudicots
- Clade: Asterids
- Order: Ericales
- Family: Ericaceae
- Genus: Arctostaphylos
- Species: A. franciscana

Binomial name
- Arctostaphylos franciscana Eastw.

Synonyms
- Arctostaphylos hookeri subsp. franciscana (Eastw.) Munz; Arctostaphylos uva-ursi var. franciscana (Eastw.) Roof; Uva-ursi franciscana (Eastw.) A.Heller

= Arctostaphylos franciscana =

Franciscan manzanita

Species of plant

Arctostaphylos franciscana, known by the common name Franciscan manzanita, is a species of manzanita. It was named by Alice Eastwood in 1905 who was the first to identify the organism as a unique species. It is native to the city of San Francisco and it is a low-growing, spreading-to-ascending evergreen shrub in the heath family Ericaceae. The name is derived from the Spanish word manzanita, which means “little apple” because of the small, apple shaped berries that grow from the plant.

== Taxonomy ==
Franciscan manzanita was formerly considered as a subspecies of Hooker's manzanita until elevated to full species rank following modern genetic analysis and comparisons.

== Description ==
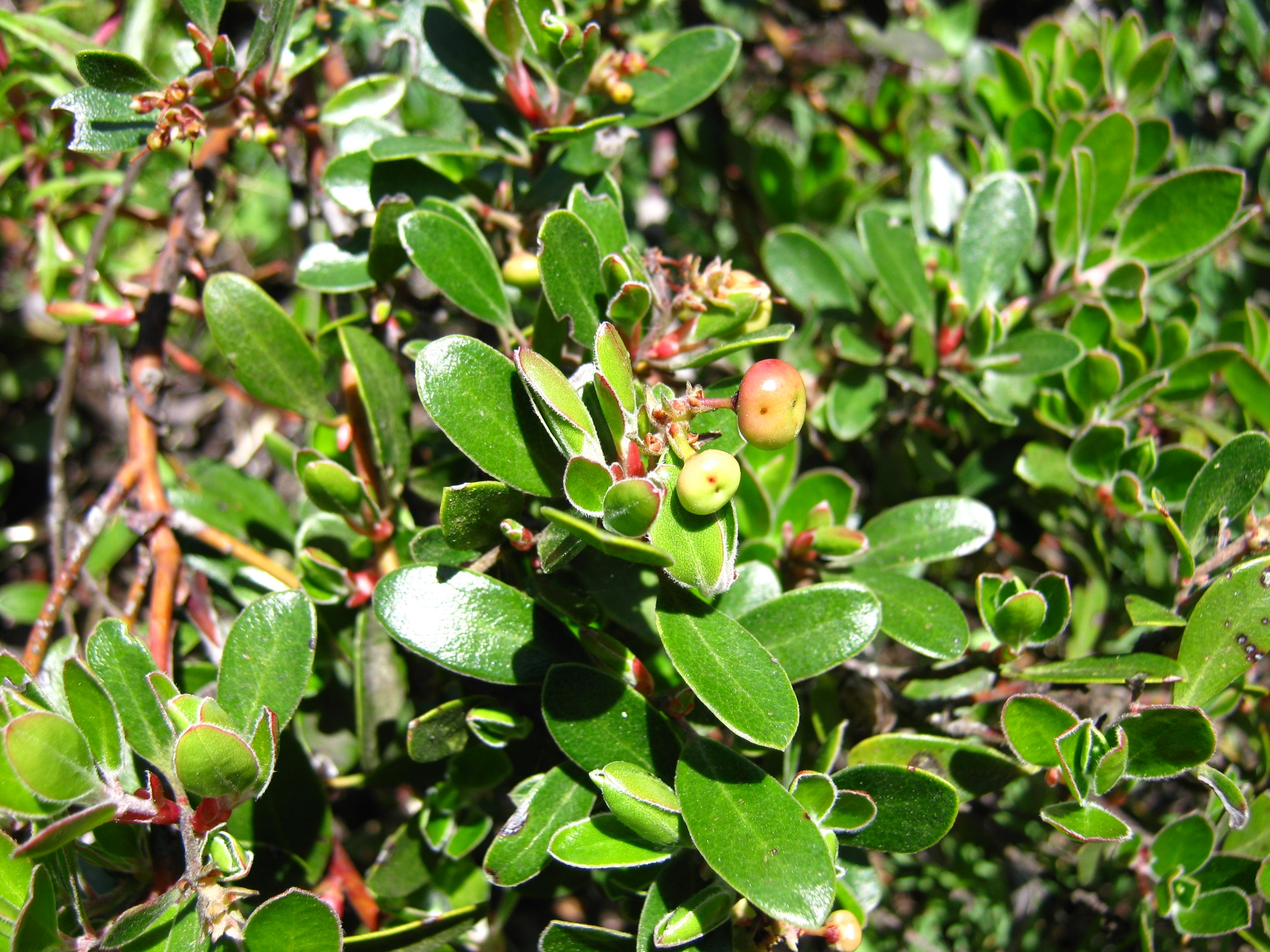
Franciscan manzanita berries and leaves

In the Spring and Winter, the Franciscan manzanita produces urn-shaped flowers with a light pink to white coloring. It also produces reddish-brown fruits that range in size from 0.24 to 0.32 in (6.1 to 8.1 mm) wide.

When the Franciscan manzanita is at its most mature state, the shrub can reach a height ranging from 2 to 3 ft (0.61 to 0.91 m) tall with an average width of 10 ft (3.0 m). The leaves, which grow to an average length of 0.6 to 0.8 in (15 to 20 mm) long, are longer than they are wide and have the same surface on both sides of the leaf. In the wild, the Franciscan manzanita does not reproduce from burls, but primarily from seeds.

== Current threats ==
The Franciscan manzanita population is very small, with only five populations left, all of which are in Presidio of San Francisco. This makes this plant very susceptible to threats. One of these threats is habitat loss and degradation which can be caused by urban development and the introduction of nonnative plants. These nonnative plants, such as Phytophthora, are a concern as they produce increased competition. Additional threats include climate change, small population size, loss of pollinators, and hybridization.

== Conservation ==
When the Laurel Hill Cemetery in San Francisco was bulldozed in 1947, it was thought that Arctostaphylos franciscana went extinct. In 2009, one wild specimen of the shrub was discovered in the Presidio by a local conservationist. The land the plant was found on was part of the Caltrans Doyle Drive Replacement Project and was not protected, which prompted litigation. The single shrub found was moved and was used to try to reproduce the species.

The U.S. Fish and Wildlife Service designated the Franciscan manzanita as an endangered species on October 5, 2012. As of 2018, the National Park Service and Golden Gate National Parks Conservancy were attempting to cross-pollinate and propagate the preserved specimen in order to reintroduce the subspecies in the wild. Efforts to germinate the manzanita seeds through smoke exposure proved beneficial in these repopulation attempts. Currently, propagated Franciscan manzanita plants are being stored at seven botanical gardens including the University of California Botanic Garden at Berkeley and the San Francisco Botanical Garden at Strybing Arboretum.
