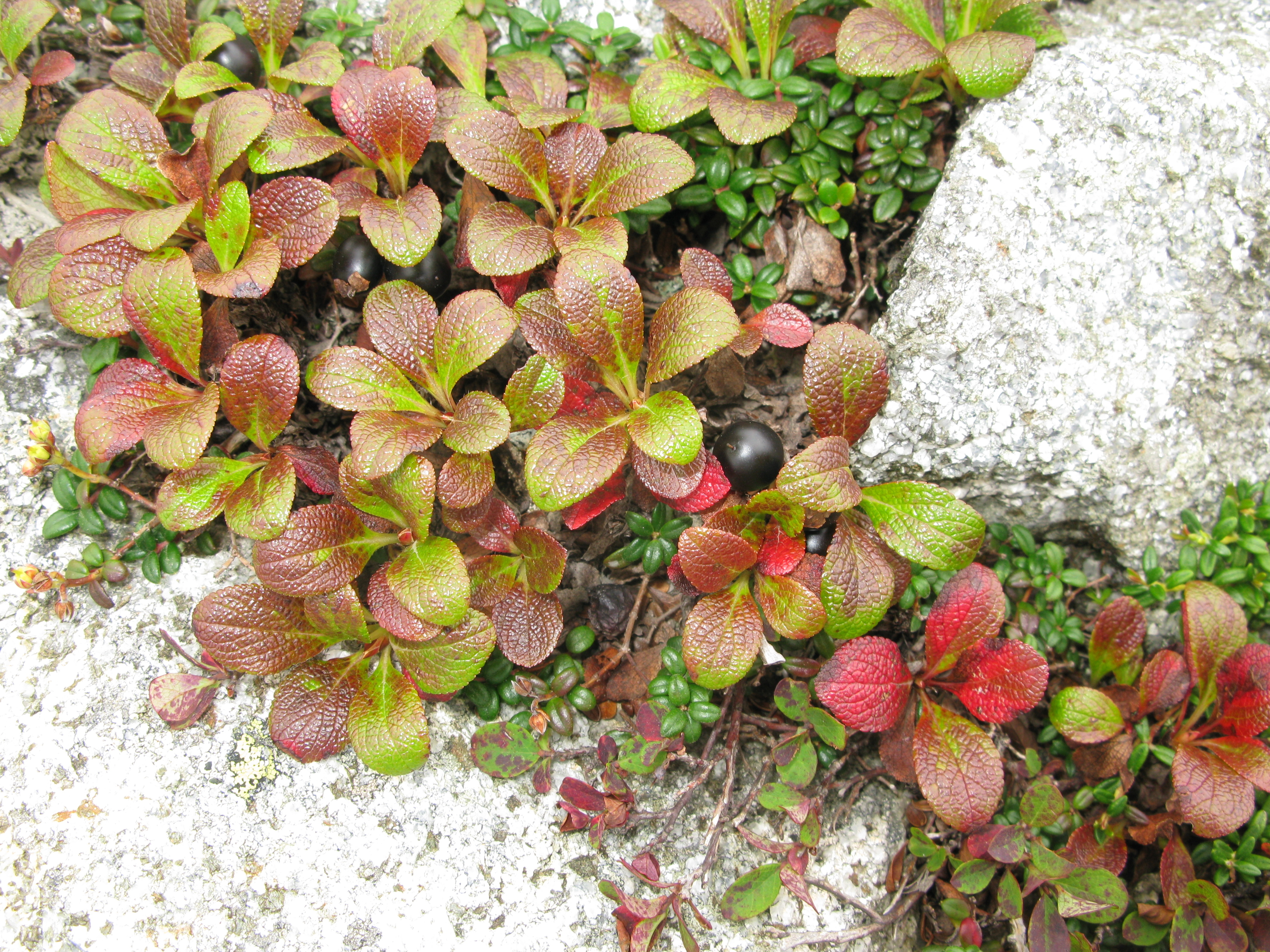
- Arctous alpina var. japonica on Mt. Iide, Fukushima Prefecture, Japan.

Conservation status
- Secure (NatureServe)

Scientific classification
- Kingdom: Plantae
- Clade: Tracheophytes
- Clade: Angiosperms
- Clade: Eudicots
- Clade: Asterids
- Order: Ericales
- Family: Ericaceae
- Genus: Arctous
- Species: A. alpina

Binomial name
- Arctous alpina (L.) Nied.

Synonyms
- Comarostaphylis polifolia; Arctostaphylos alpina

= Arctous alpina =

Species of flowering plant

Arctous alpina (syn. Arctostaphylos alpina), the alpine bearberry, mountain bearberry or black bearberry, is a dwarf shrub in the heather family Ericaceae. The basionym of this species is Arbutus alpina L..

== Description ==
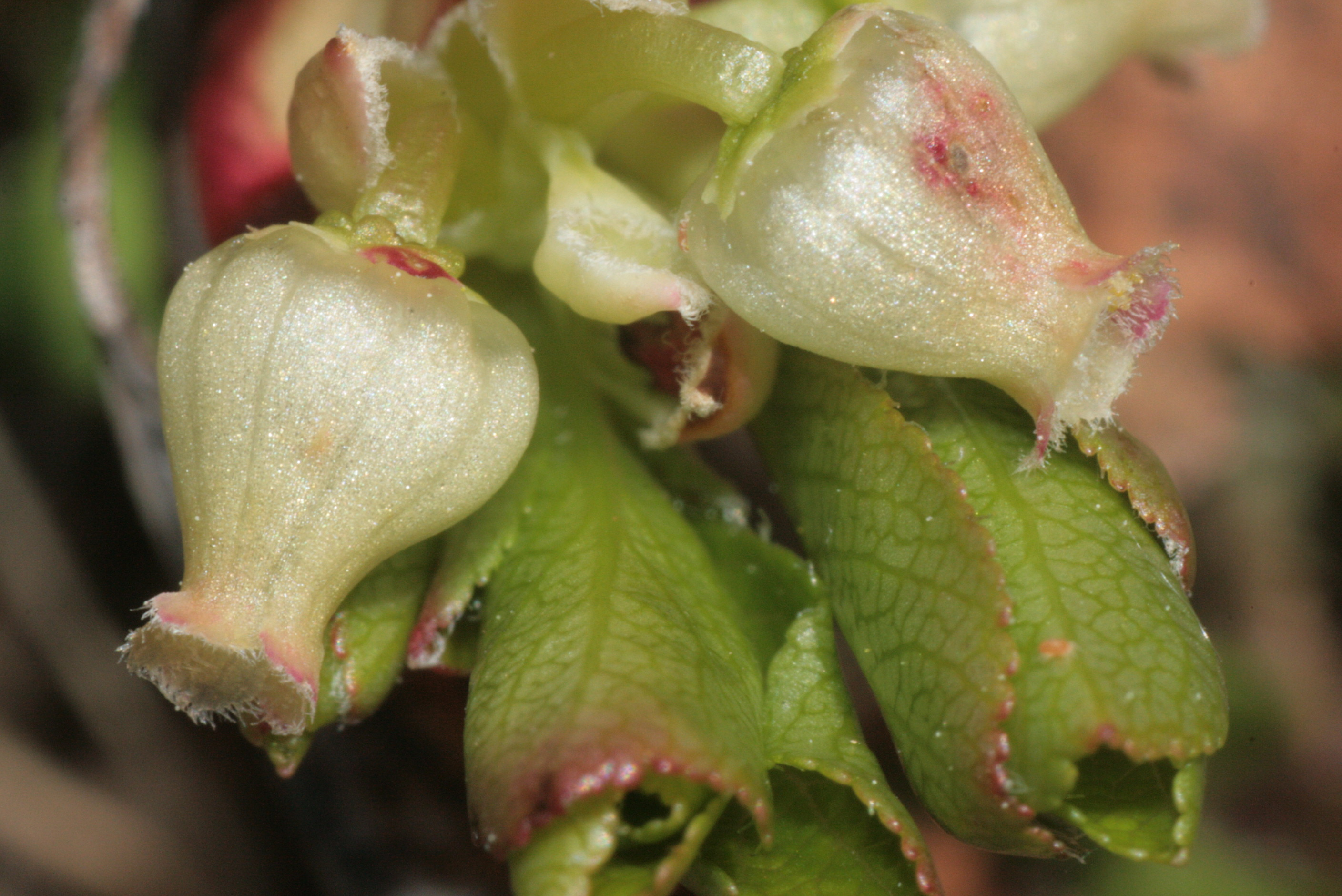
Flowers

Arctous alpina is a procumbent shrub usually less than 6 inches (15 cm) high with a woody stem and straggling branches. The leaves are alternate and wither in the autumn but remain on the plant for another year. The leaves are stalked and are oval with serrated margins and a network of veins. They often turn red to scarlet in autumn. The flowers are in groups of two to five, white or pink and urn-shaped and about 3 to 5 mm (0.12 to 0.20 in) long. They have five sepals, five fused petals with five small projecting lobes, ten stamens and a single carpel. The fruits are spherical, 9 to 12 mm (0.35 to 0.47 in) long, initially green, then red and finally glossy black and succulent when ripe. This plant flowers in June.

== Distribution and habitat ==
Arctous alpina has a circumpolar distribution. It is found at high latitudes, from Scotland east across Scandinavia, Russia, Alaska, Northern Canada and Greenland. Its southern limits in Europe are the Pyrenees and the Alps, in Asia, the Altay Mountains and Mongolia, and in North America, British Columbia in the west, and Maine and New Hampshire in the east. Its natural habitat is moorland, dry forests with birch and pine and hummocks covered in moss at the edges of bogs.

== Ecology ==
Arctous alpina forms a symbiotic relationship life with fungi which supply it with nutrients such as phosphorus. The berries are appreciated by birds.

== Use by humans ==
The rather flavorless berries are used as food by Alaska Natives, although researchers studying the Siberian Yupiks have speculated that they may be avoided due to the possibility of causing poisoning.

The bark and leaves have documented medicinal uses by the Ojibwe.
