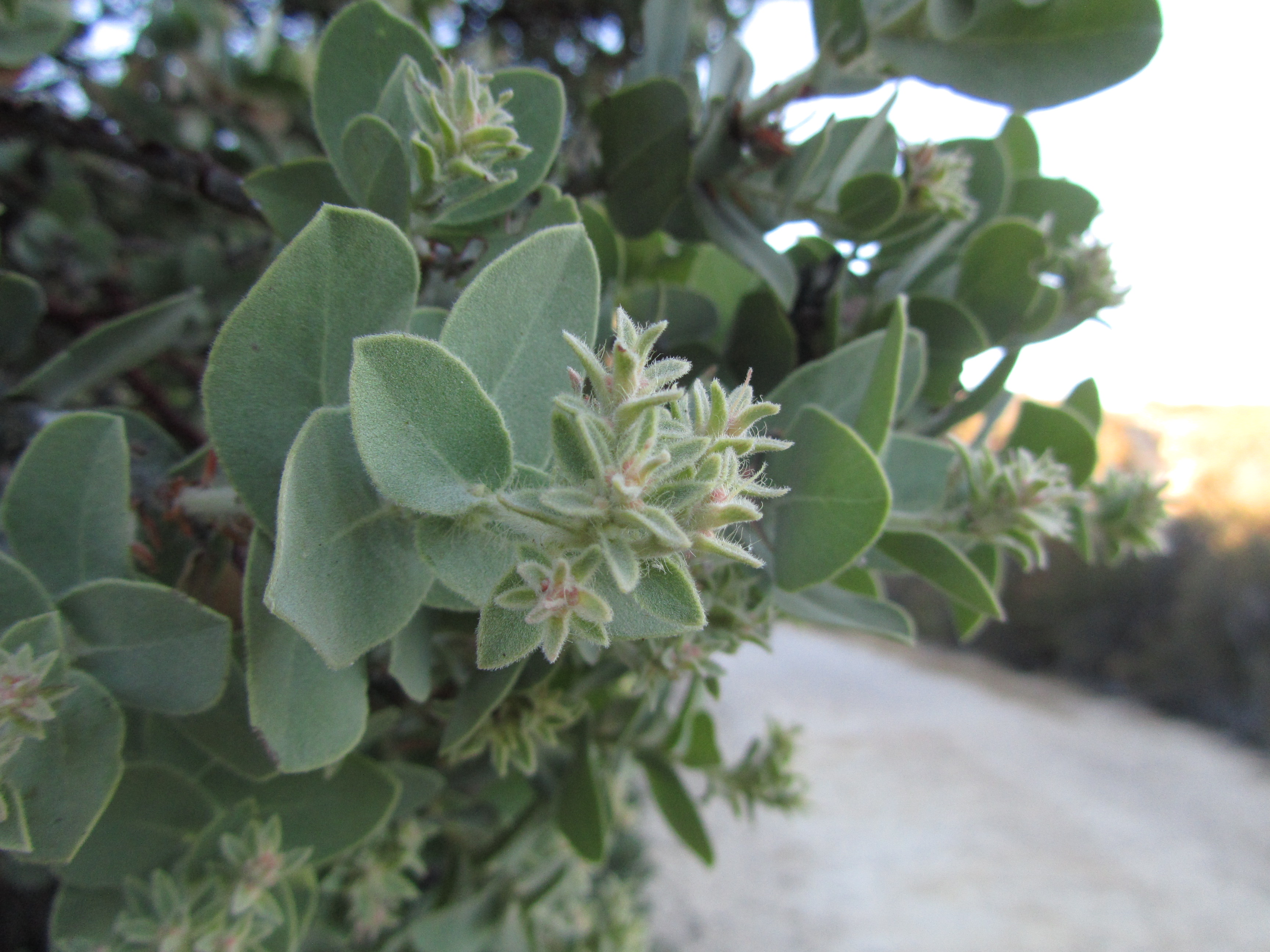

Conservation status
- Imperiled (NatureServe)

Scientific classification
- Kingdom: Plantae
- Clade: Tracheophytes
- Clade: Angiosperms
- Clade: Eudicots
- Clade: Asterids
- Order: Ericales
- Family: Ericaceae
- Genus: Arctostaphylos
- Species: A. auriculata

Binomial name
- Arctostaphylos auriculata Eastw.

= Arctostaphylos auriculata =

Mount Diablo manzanita

Species of flowering plant

Arctostaphylos auriculata (Mount Diablo manzanita) is an endangered species of Arctostaphylos endemic to California, and limited in geography to the area surrounding Mount Diablo, in Contra Costa County.

== Description ==
Arctostaphylos auriculata is a woody shrub 1–4.5 m high with serpentine, glandless stems covered in white hair. The short [1.5-4.5 cm], silvery leaves overlap and have deeply lobed bases. It flowers densely in white flowers from February through May. The fruit is also hairy and small (5–10 mm). The Mount Diablo manzanita has no basal burl for regrowth and must propagate by seed.

== Distribution ==
Growing in sandstone chaparral around 150-650 meter elevation, the thick undergrowth of Mount Diablo manzanita is often accompanied by poison oak or California wild grapes.

== See also ==
- California chaparral and woodlands
- California montane chaparral and woodlands
- California interior chaparral and woodlands
