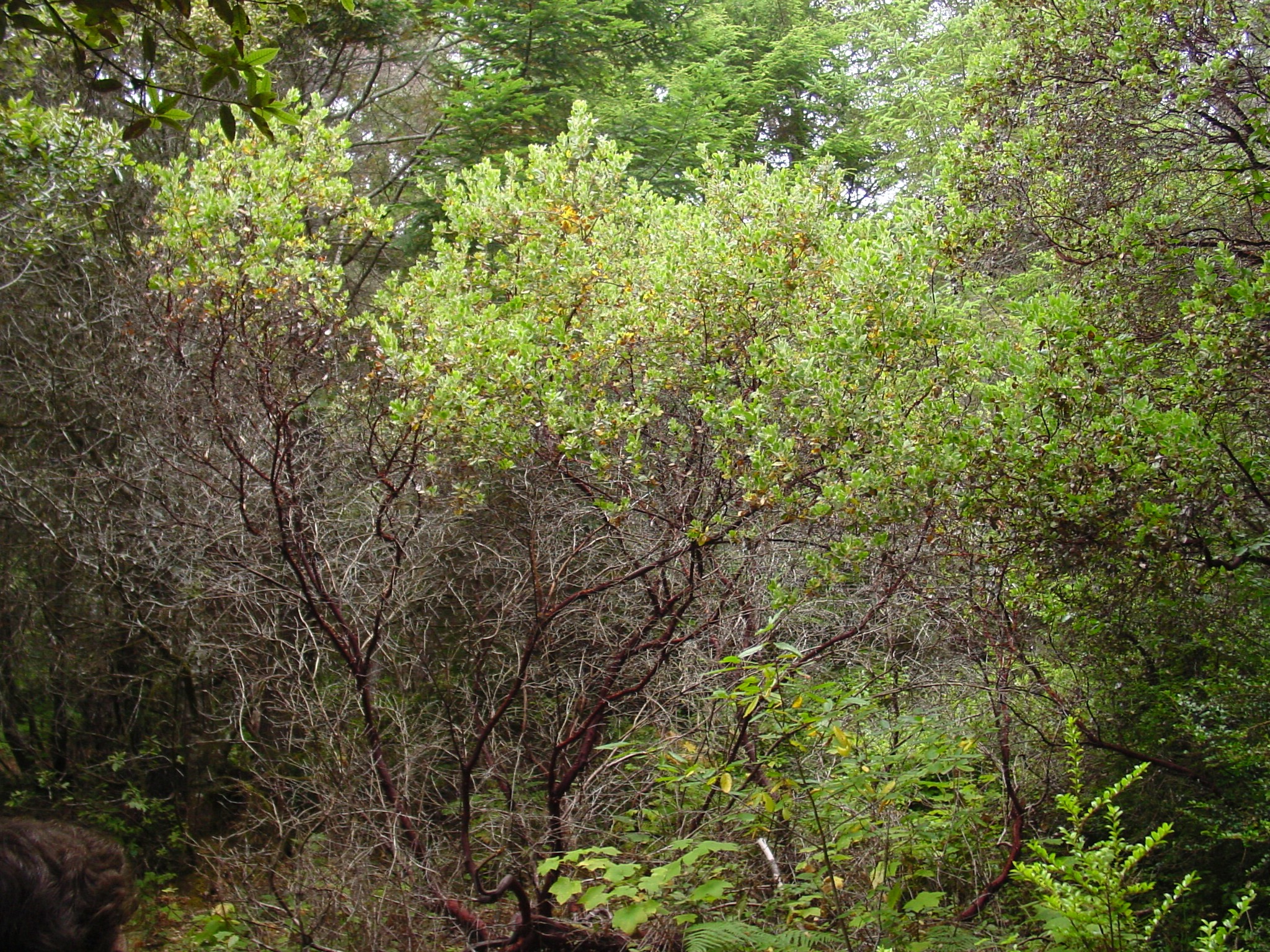

Conservation status
- Least Concern (IUCN 3.1)

Scientific classification
- Kingdom: Plantae
- Clade: Tracheophytes
- Clade: Angiosperms
- Clade: Eudicots
- Clade: Asterids
- Order: Ericales
- Family: Ericaceae
- Genus: Arctostaphylos
- Species: A. columbiana

Binomial name
- Arctostaphylos columbiana Piper

Synonyms
- Arctostaphylos tracyi

= Arctostaphylos columbiana =

Species of flowering plant

Arctostaphylos columbiana is a species of manzanita known by the common name hairy manzanita. It is native to the coast of western North America from northern California to southwestern British Columbia. This large manzanita is a shrub or small tree, usually 1–5 meters tall. It is erect with hairy branches. The leaves are oval-shaped and are usually 2-6 centimeters long and 2-3 wide, pale bluish green, fuzzy on both surfaces, occasionally glandular. The small, white, urn-shaped flowers are borne in bunched inflorescences. The fruit is a red drupe about a centimeter in diameter. The seed requires either fire or consumption by animals in order for germination to occur. This manzanita grows in open, rocky areas. It is sometimes grown as a garden ornamental. Hybrids with Arctostaphylos uva-ursi (named Arctostaphylos x media) commonly occur where the two parent species grow in proximity.
