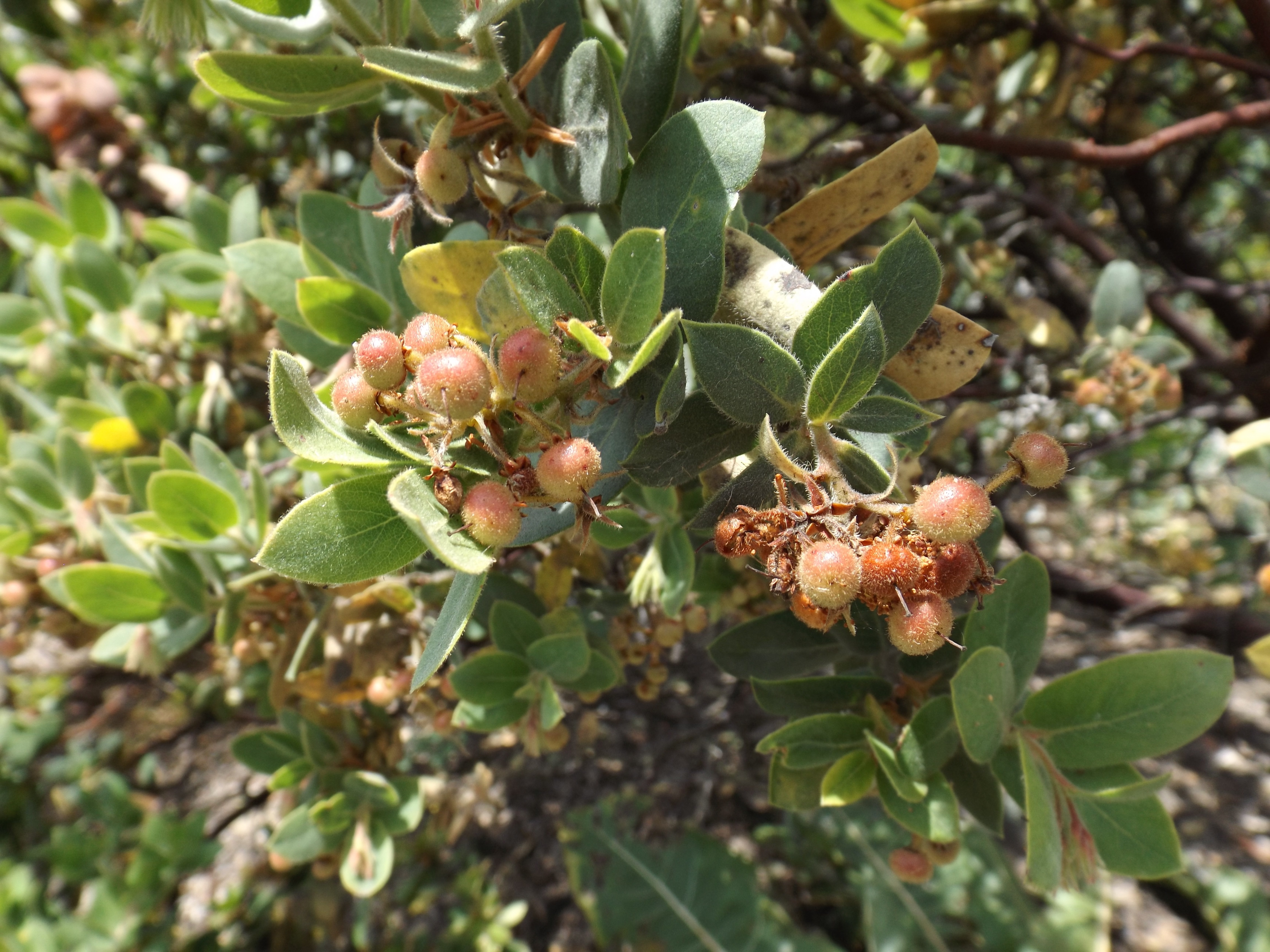

Conservation status
- Imperiled (NatureServe)

Scientific classification
- Kingdom: Plantae
- Clade: Embryophytes
- Clade: Tracheophytes
- Clade: Angiosperms
- Clade: Eudicots
- Clade: Asterids
- Order: Ericales
- Family: Ericaceae
- Genus: Arctostaphylos
- Species: A. hookeri

Binomial name
- Arctostaphylos hookeri G.Don

= Arctostaphylos hookeri =

Species of plant

Arctostaphylos hookeri is a species of manzanita known by the common name Hooker's manzanita.

== Description ==
Arctostaphylos hookeri is a low shrub which is variable in appearance and has several subspecies. These are generally mat-forming plants or low bushes with small green leaves, dense inflorescences of white to pink flowers, and shiny egg-shaped or round red drupes. These plants belong to the heath family, also known as heathers (Ericaceae).

== Distribution ==
The Arctostaphylos hookeri shrub is endemic to California where its native range extends from the coastal San Francisco Bay Area to the Central Coast. It grows in sandy, coastal pine or oak woods.

== Subspecies ==
There are two subspecies recognised:

- A. h. hearstiorum - Hearst's manzanita - native to San Luis Obispo County
- A. h. hookeri - Hooker's manzanita - grows in the Santa Cruz Mountains and nearby

== See also ==
- California chaparral and woodlands
- California coastal sage and chaparral
