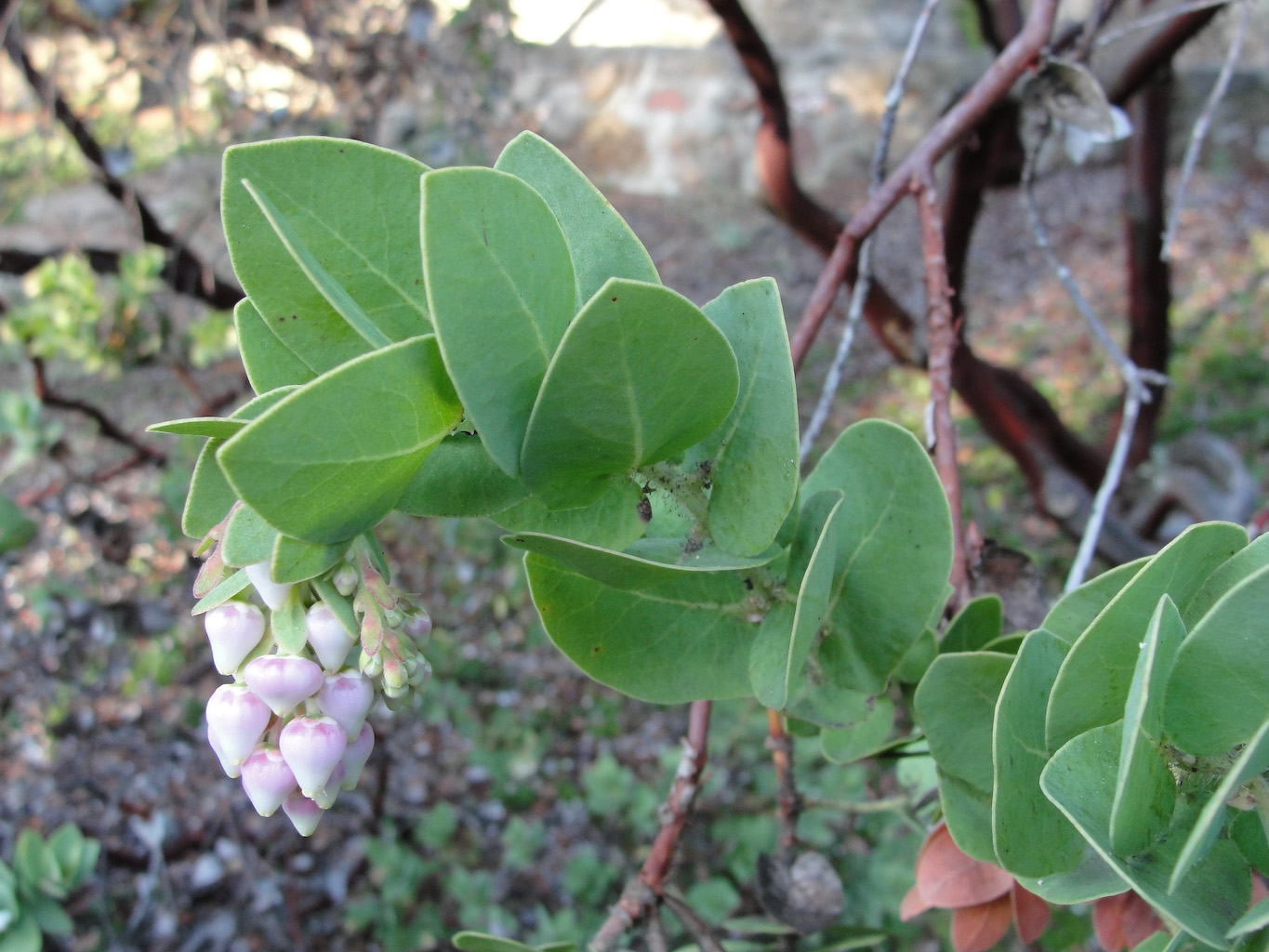

Conservation status
- Vulnerable (NatureServe)

Scientific classification
- Kingdom: Plantae
- Clade: Tracheophytes
- Clade: Angiosperms
- Clade: Eudicots
- Clade: Asterids
- Order: Ericales
- Family: Ericaceae
- Genus: Arctostaphylos
- Species: A. refugioensis

Binomial name
- Arctostaphylos refugioensis Gankin

= Arctostaphylos refugioensis =

Species of flowering plant

Arctostaphylos refugioensis is a species of manzanita, known by the common name Refugio manzanita. It is endemic to Santa Barbara County, California, where it can be found along the immediate coastline, including the vicinity of Refugio State Beach, and into the Santa Ynez Mountains of the northwestern Transverse Ranges.

== Description ==
Arctostaphylos refugioensis is a plant of the coastal sage and chaparral on sandstone soils. This is a shrub reaching at least 2 metres (6.6 ft) tall and known to exceed 4 metres (13 ft) in maximum height.

Its branches are covered in long, gland-tipped bristles and a dense foliage of oblong greenish to deep red leaves. Each leaf is dull, waxy, and often bristly in texture, smooth or toothed along the edges, and up to 4.5 centimeters long.

The shrub flowers in winter in inflorescences of cone-shaped manzanita flowers each up to a centimeter long. The fruit is a spherical to oval red drupe with a pointed end, measuring at least a centimeter long.

== See also ==
- California chaparral and woodlands — ecoregion.
  - California coastal sage and chaparral — subregion.
  - California montane chaparral and woodlands — subregion.
