= Arctostaphylos glandulosa subsp. gabrielensis =

San Gabriel manzanita

Conservation status
- Vulnerable (NatureServe)

Scientific classification
- Kingdom: Plantae
- Clade: Embryophytes
- Clade: Tracheophytes
- Clade: Spermatophytes
- Clade: Angiosperms
- Clade: Eudicots
- Clade: Asterids
- Order: Ericales
- Family: Ericaceae
- Genus: Arctostaphylos
- Species: A. glandulosa
- Subspecies: A. g. subsp. gabrielensis

Trinomial name
- Arctostaphylos glandulosa subsp. gabrielensis (P.V.Wells) J.E.Keeley, M.C.Vasey & V.T.Parker

Synonyms
- Arctostaphylos gabrielensis P.V.Wells

Subspecies of flowering plant

Arctostaphylos glandulosa subsp. gabrielensis, known by the common name San Gabriel manzanita, is a subspecies of manzanita. It is endemic to one small area in the San Gabriel Mountains of Los Angeles County, California.

It is a member of the California montane chaparral and woodlands plant community.

== Description ==
This is a shrub growing to heights between one and two meters. It has an erect form with a large, spherical burl. Leaves are bright green, shiny, and mostly hairless. They are 2 to 4 cm (0.79 to 1.57 in) long with smooth edges. The shrub blooms in dense inflorescences of urn-shaped manzanita flowers. The fruit is a rounded red drupe up to 14 mm (0.55 in) wide.
