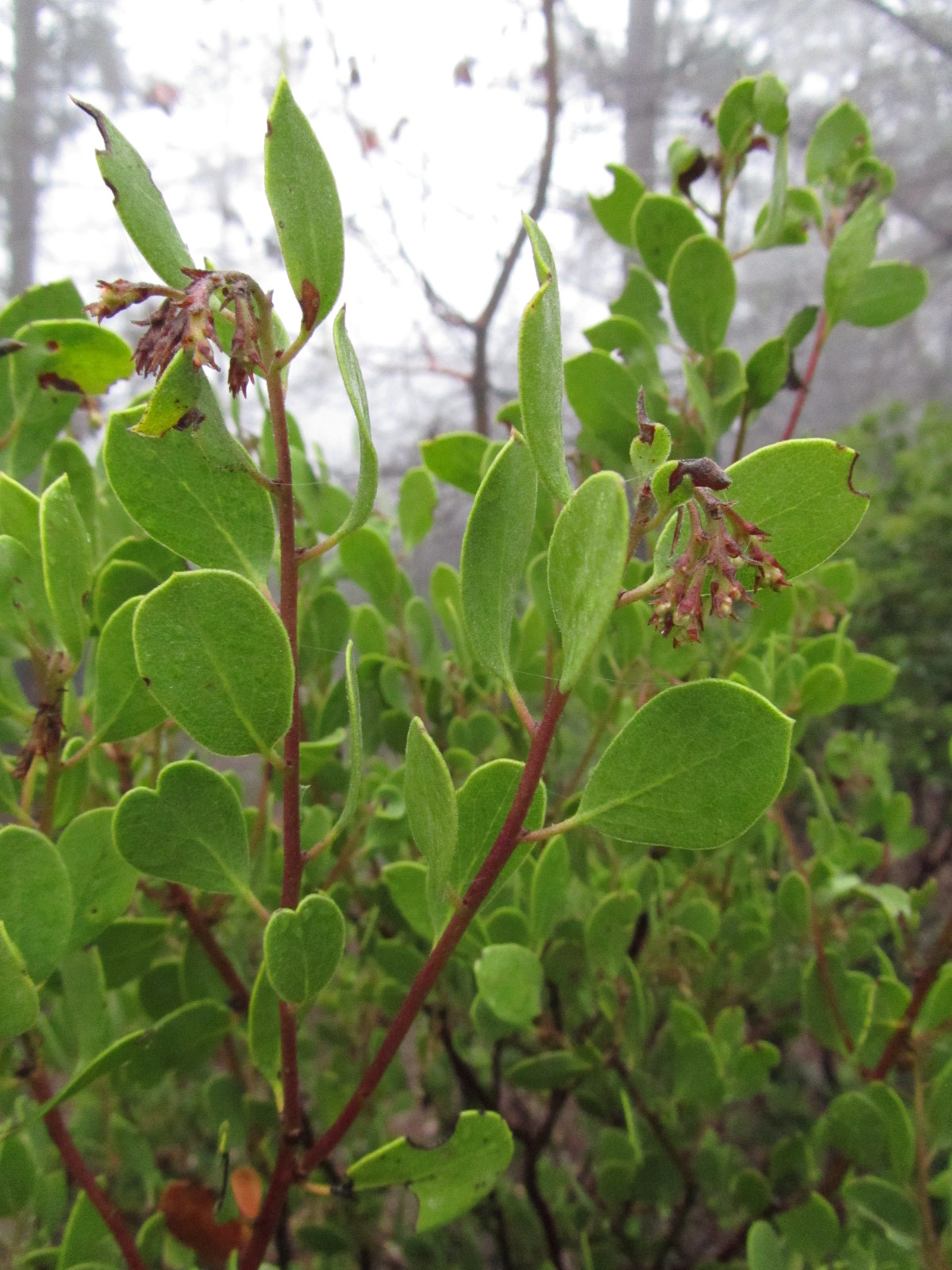

Conservation status
- Critically Imperiled (NatureServe)

Scientific classification
- Kingdom: Plantae
- Clade: Tracheophytes
- Clade: Angiosperms
- Clade: Eudicots
- Clade: Asterids
- Order: Ericales
- Family: Ericaceae
- Genus: Arctostaphylos
- Species: A. ohloneana

Binomial name
- Arctostaphylos ohloneana M.C.Vasey & V.T.Parker

= Arctostaphylos ohloneana =

Species of flowering plant

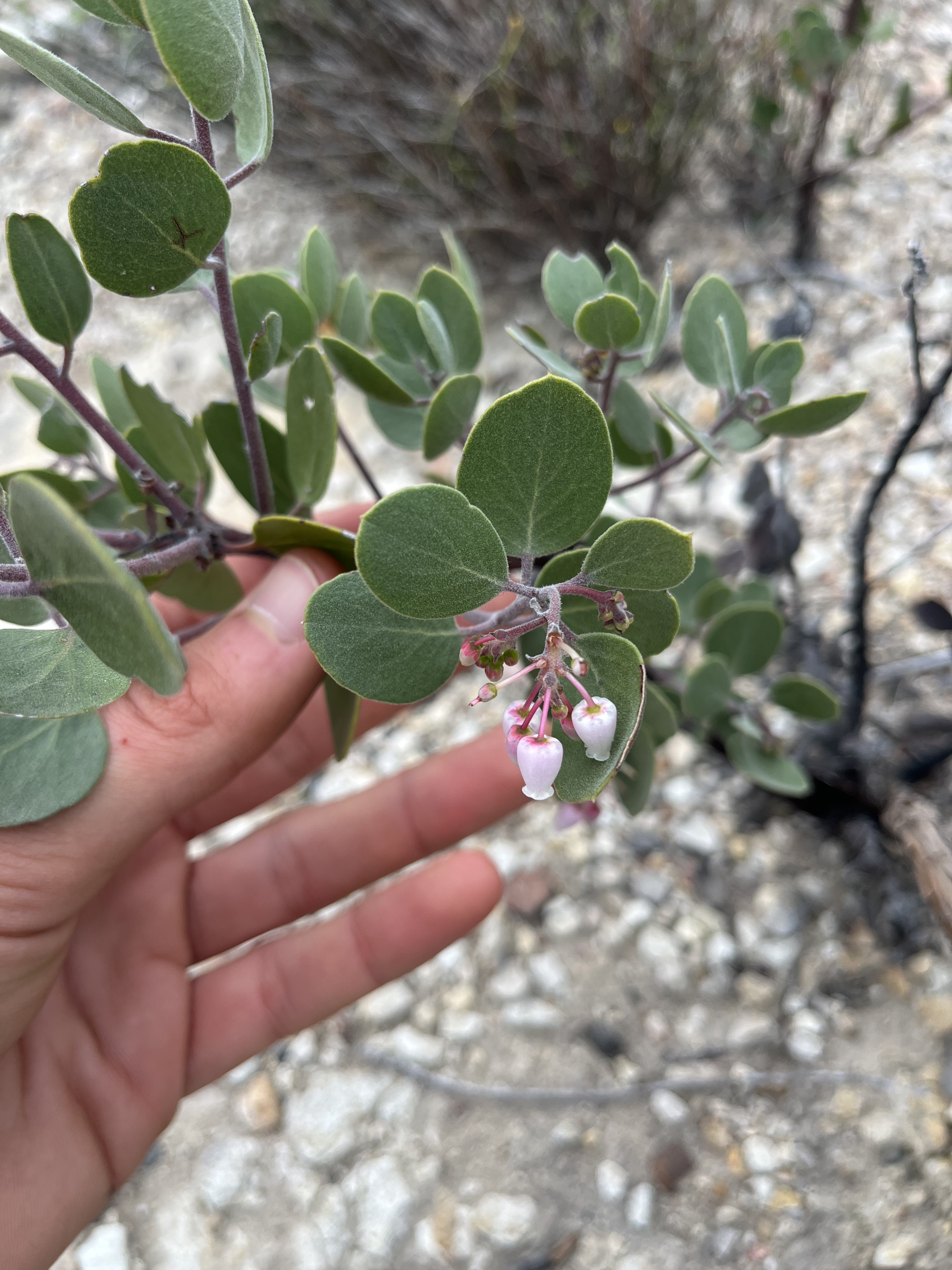
Small urn shaped flowers of the Ohlone Manzanita

Arctostaphylos ohloneana is a rare species of manzanita known by the common name Ohlone manzanita, in the Santa Cruz Mountains in California. It takes its name after the native American Ohlone people who settled along the California coast between San Francisco and Santa Cruz. It is endemic to northwest Santa Cruz County, where it is known only from four populations on Ben Lomond Mountain, just south of Big Basin Redwoods State Park.

It was discovered in the 1980s by botanists James A. West and Randall Morgan among other manzanita species on the mountain and it was described to science in 2008. There are an estimated 100 individuals in existence.

This article will discuss the small distribution range this endangered species inhabits, as well as a brief description of the plant and the threats it faces along with conservation efforts.

== Distribution ==
Arctostaphylos ohloneana occurs in maritime chaparral and oak and pine forest habitat on whitish soils of siliceous shale origin. The plants all occur on land owned by Lockheed Martin. Typically found in elevation of about 400-500m

== Description ==
Arctostaphylos ohloneana is an erect, bushy shrub reaching one or two meters in height. The branches are covered in reddish-brown bark and the newer twigs have fuzzy hairs. The light green leaves are erect with a petiole that is 3-5mm, a blade that is elliptic to ovate-elliptic that is 1.5-3cm long by 1-1.5cm wide. Leaf margin is entire. The leaves are puberulent and glandular when young. With age they are glabrous. The inflorescence is a panicle of white or pinkish conical or urn-shaped flowers with radial symmetry. Nascent inflorescence pendent.The fruit is a spherical reddish-brown drupe 5 to 8 millimeters wide, glabrous; stones variably fused or free. Its genome is diploid.

== Conservation and threats ==
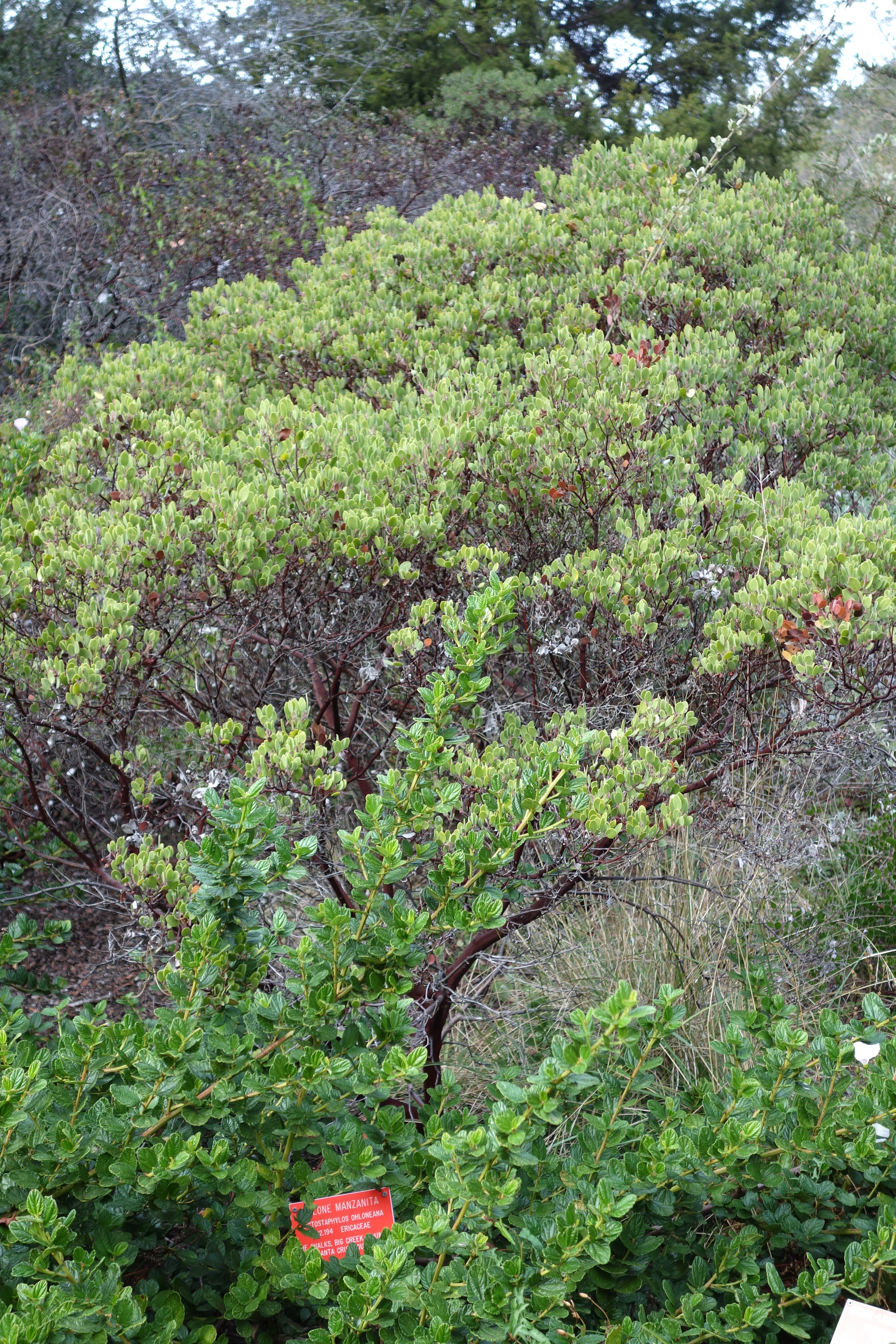

Arctostaphylos ohloneana has a global conservation status of G1 and a California state status of S1, meaning it is critically imperiled. As of early 2009 there were 4 small populations on Ben Lomond Mountain, however later that year the Lockheed fire went through the area and may have nearly ushered the species into extinction had it not been for the uneven topography of the area, low amount of fuel at their base, as well as how fast the fire went through the area. During two 2015 surveys, about 20 individuals were found and recorded, however further surveys are necessary to understand the current population size of the species. The Ohlone manzanita already has a dangerously low number of individuals and faces further threats of extinction from multiple sources. Firstly, inbreeding depression as a result of the low population numbers, potential future fires in the area and habitat disruption as a result of road maintenance or vehicle traffic. It may also face the threat of root rot as a result of Phytophthora ramorum, although the small number of Ohlone manzanitas tested in 2020 at the UC Santa Cruz Arboretum tested negative for the disease. The UCSC Arboretum and Botanic Garden has done its part to help conserve this species by planting one with their other California native species in the Conservation Garden. The UCSC Arboretum has also added some Ohlone Manzanita seeds to its seed bank for preservation.
