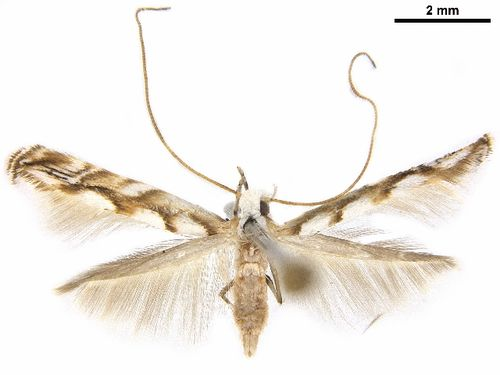

Scientific classification
- Kingdom: Animalia
- Phylum: Arthropoda
- Class: Insecta
- Order: Lepidoptera
- Family: Gracillariidae
- Genus: Acrocercops
- Species: A. arbutella

Binomial name
- Acrocercops arbutella Braun, 1925

= Acrocercops arbutella =

Species of moth

Acrocercops arbutella is a moth of the family Gracillariidae, known from Arizona, United States.

The host plant for the species is Arbutus arizonica. They mine the leaves of their host plant. The mine has the form of a large upper side blotch mine. The loosened epidermis of the mine is very thin and whitish at first. Later it turns brownish. The parenchyma is either almost entirely consumed over about half the mine, or irregularly eaten over the whole mine.
