= Arbutus tessellata =

Scientific classification
- Kingdom: Plantae
- Clade: Tracheophytes
- Clade: Angiosperms
- Clade: Eudicots
- Clade: Asterids
- Order: Ericales
- Family: Ericaceae
- Genus: Arbutus
- Species: A. tessellata

Binomial name
- Arbutus tessellata P.D.Sørensen 1987

Species of flowering plant

Arbutus tessellata is a Mexican species of shrubs in the heath family. It is widespread across much of northern and central Mexico from Chihuahua to Jalisco, Tlaxcala, and Veracruz. It is found in a variety of habitats including Coastal chaparral and Mixed evergreen scrub and woodland. It has a relatively low seed germination rate which is one of the reasons that it is found in scattered populations. They produce red berries and their bark peels.
