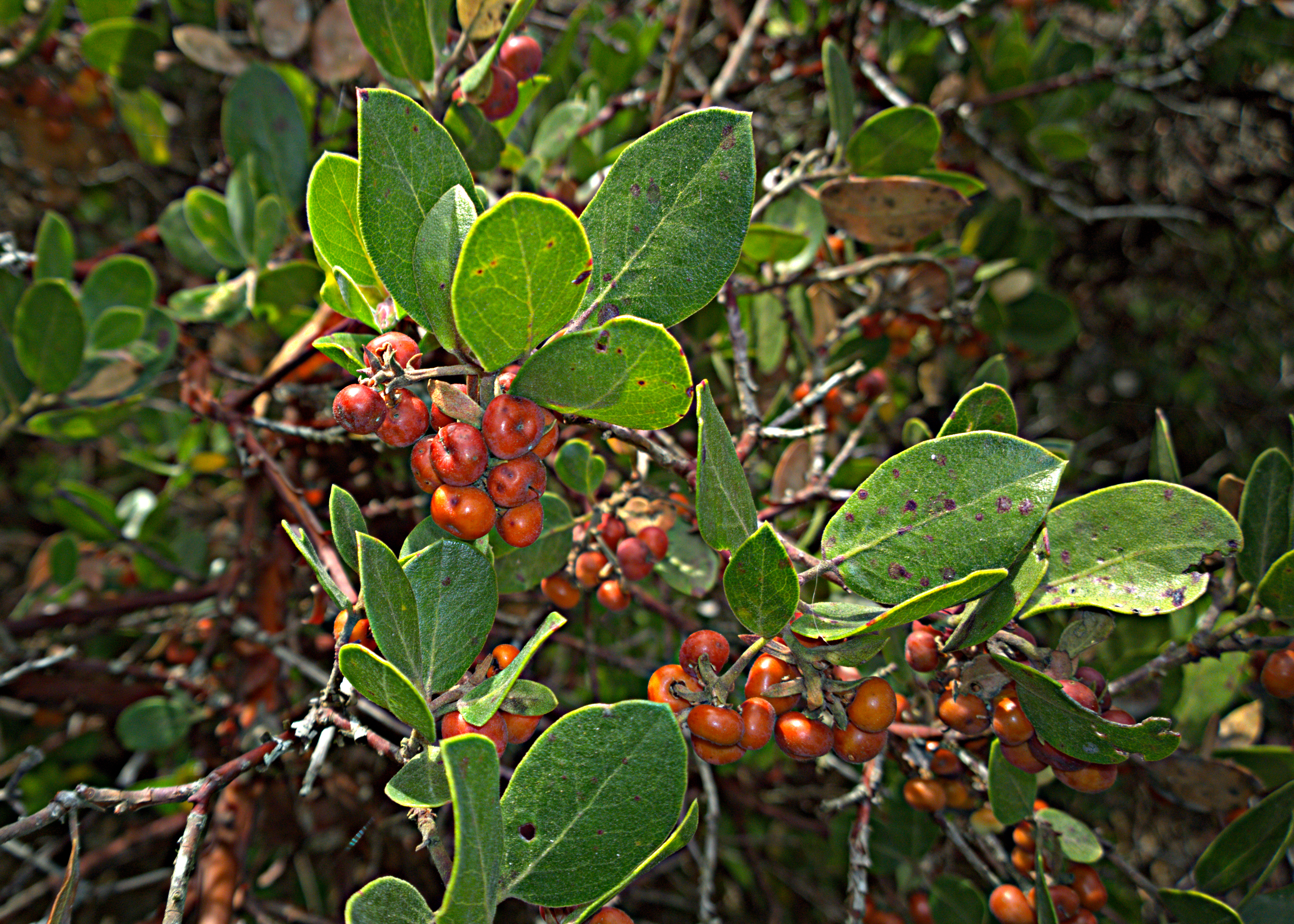

Scientific classification
- Kingdom: Plantae
- Clade: Tracheophytes
- Clade: Angiosperms
- Clade: Eudicots
- Clade: Asterids
- Order: Ericales
- Family: Ericaceae
- Genus: Arctostaphylos
- Species: A. crustacea

Binomial name
- Arctostaphylos crustacea Eastw. (1933)

Synonyms
- Arctostaphylos glandulosa subsp. crustacea

= Arctostaphylos crustacea =

Species of shrub

Arctostaphylos crustacea, commonly known as brittleleaf manzanita, is a species of manzanita found mostly in the fog belt of the Central Coast of California and the San Francisco Bay Area.

== Description ==
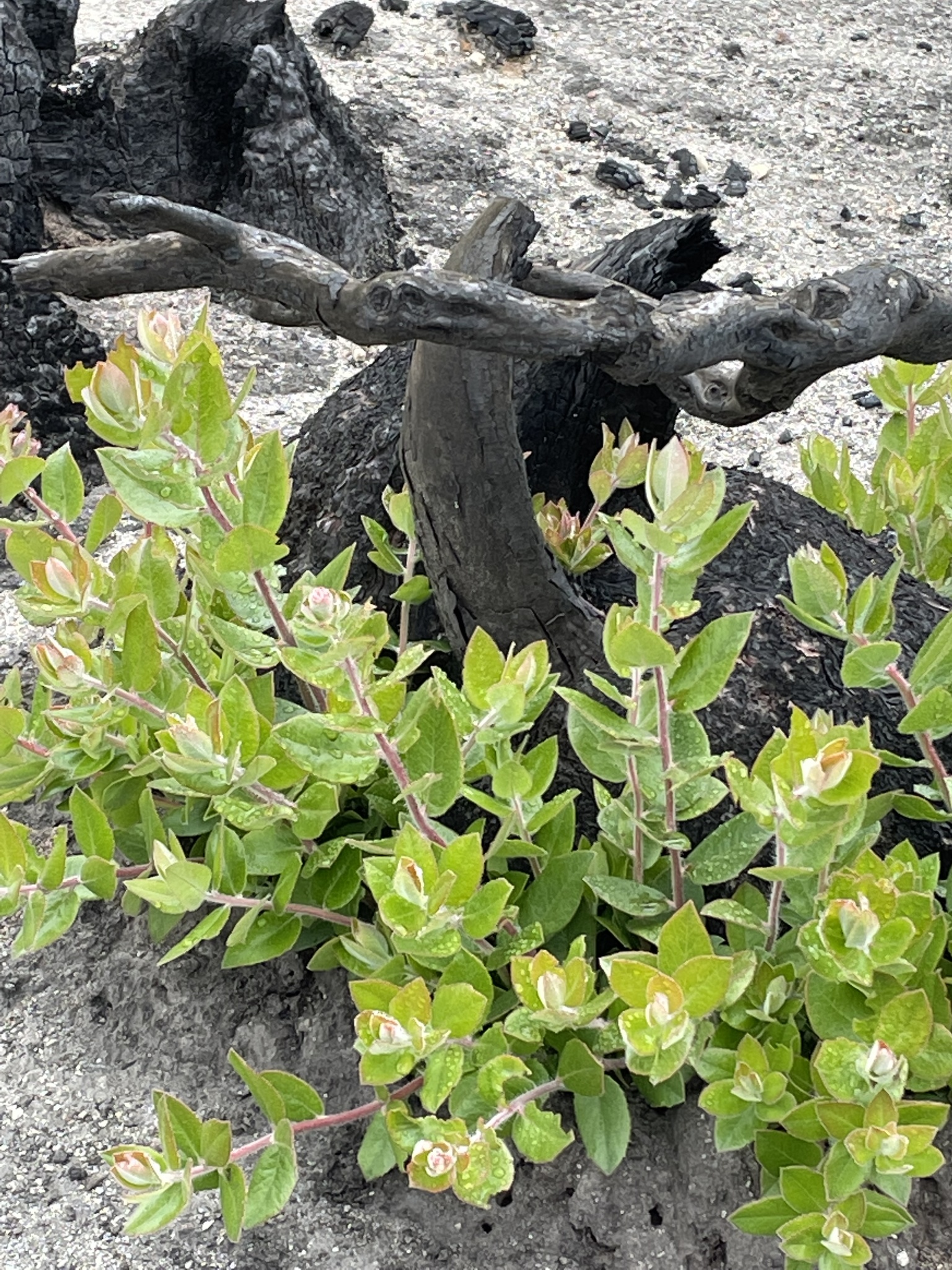
Arctostaphylos crustacea resprouting from a burl

Plants of this species are generally shrubs of up to 3 m (9.8 ft) in height, with smooth, reddish bark, and ovate leaves that are 2–5 cm (0.79–1.97 in) long.

This species, unlike many others manzanitas, has bifacial leaves, leaves which mostly only have stomata on their lower surface. Fruits of this species are depressed-globose (shaped like a squashed sphere) drupes which contain multiple separate nutlets. The flowers are urn-shaped and grow on multi-branched panicles. Plants of this species, like some others in the genus Arctostaphylos, have a burl at their base from which they resprout from after the shrub is top-killed by fires.

== Taxonomy ==
This species used to be part of the Arctostaphylos tomentosa complex, but was split in 2007. Below is a list of subspecies:

- Arctostaphylos crustacea subsp. crustacea — nominate subspecies; it has hairy twigs with long and short bristles with the lower side of its leaves mostly hairless. It's found in the Santa Cruz Mountains, the East Bay Hills, as well as parts of Monterey and San Luis Obispo counties.

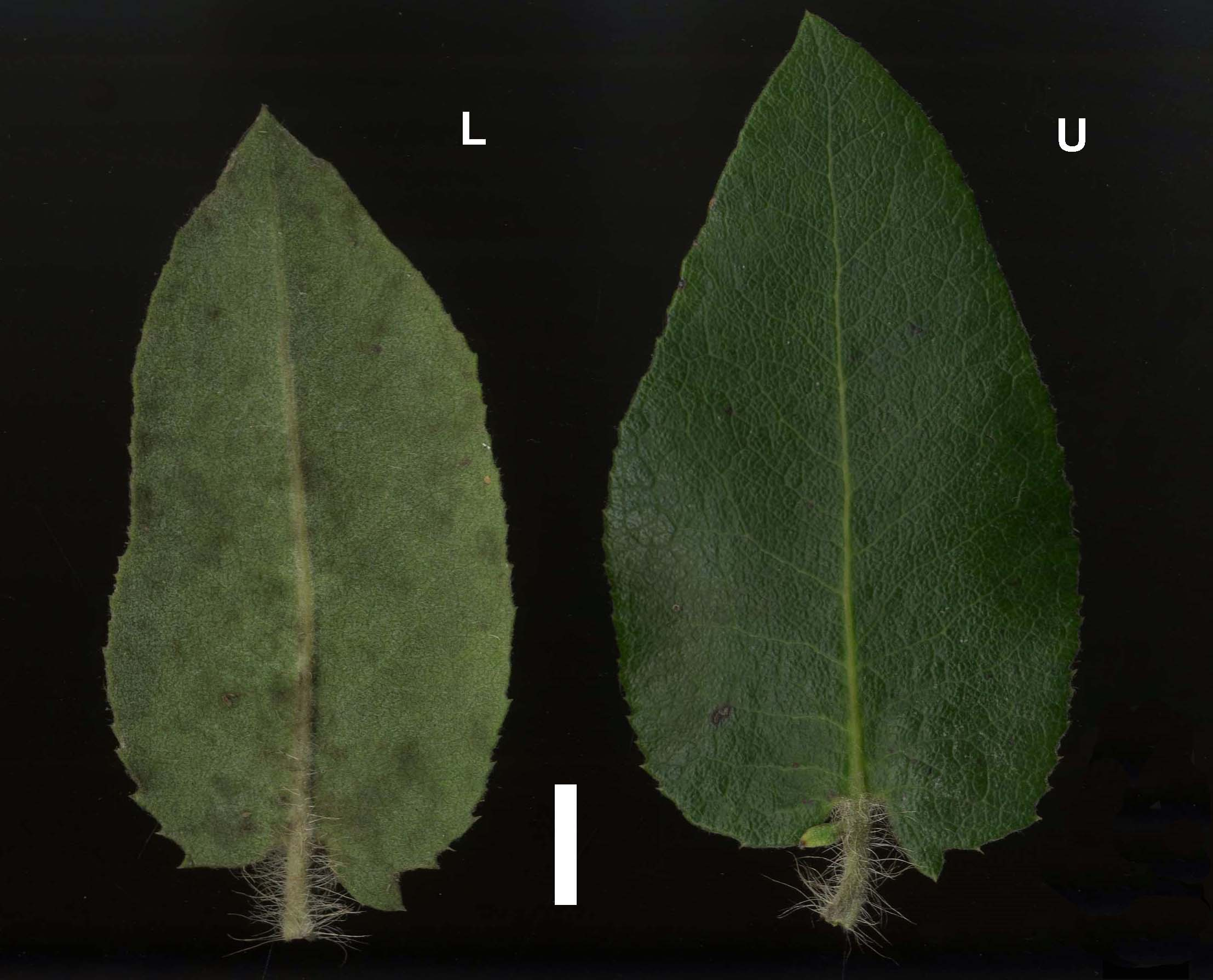
Image of leaf of A. c. crustacea. Note the mostly-hairless underside of the leaf

- Arctostaphylos crustacea subsp. crinita — This subspecies has hairy twigs with long and short bristles, with the lower side of its leaves covered with dense hairs. It is found in the southern Santa Cruz Mountains and some isolated parts of the Central Coast.

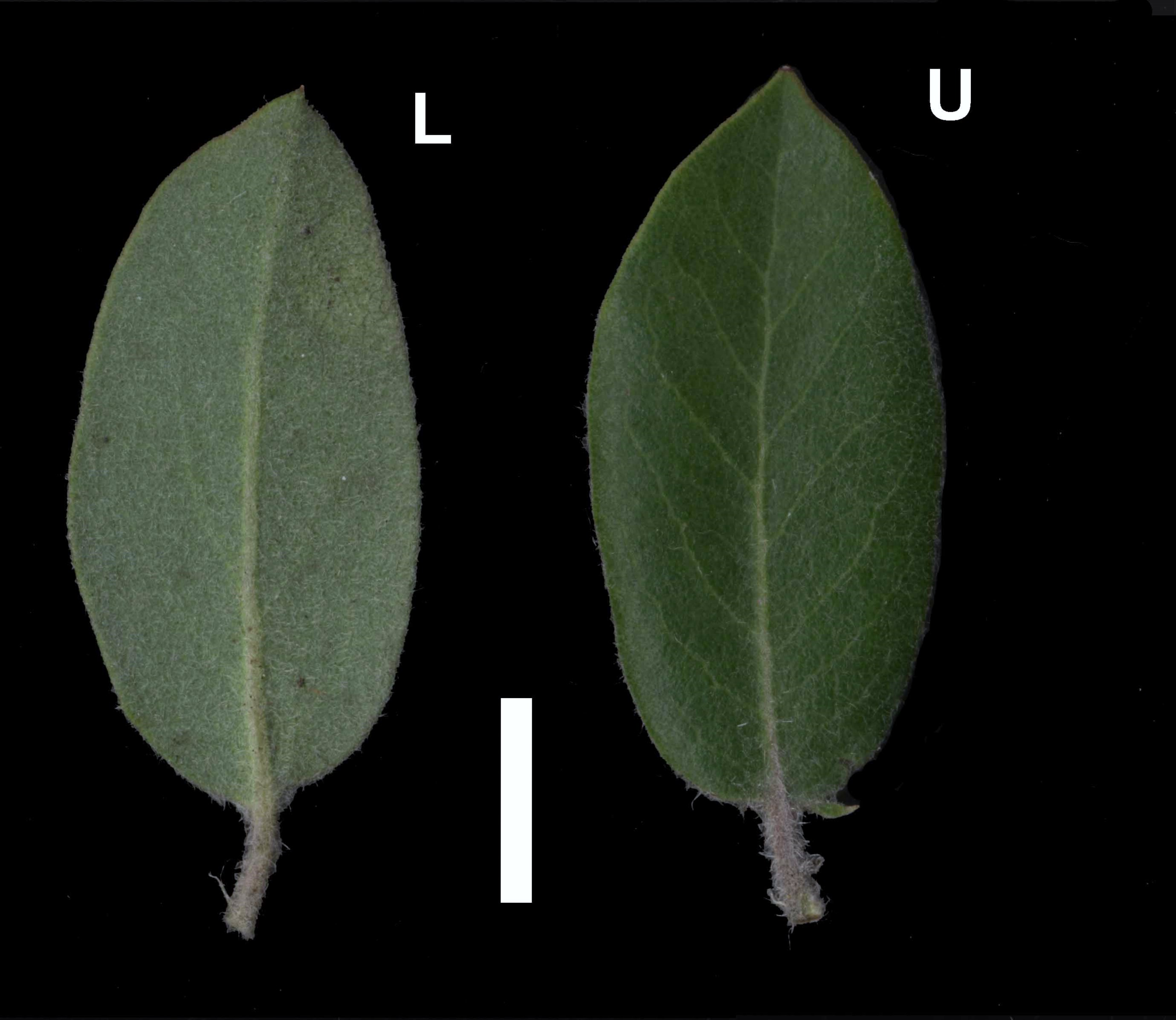
Image of leaf of A. c. crinita. Note the tomentose hairs on the underside of the leaf.

- Arctostaphylos crustacea subsp. eastwoodiana — This subspecies has twigs that are hairy but without long bristles and leaves with glabrous undersides. It has a very limited range, found in western Santa Barbara County near Lompoc, mostly on substrate derived from siliceous rocks, twigs hairy but without long bristles.
- Arctostaphylos crustacea subsp. insulicola — This subspecies has twigs that are hairy but without long bristles and leaves with hairy undersides. It's found on Santa Rosa and Santa Cruz Islands, mostly on substrate derived from volcanic rocks.
- Arctostaphylos crustacea subsp. rosei — This subspecies has twigs that are hairy but without long bristles and leaves with glabrous undersides. Its range is very fragmented, only being found in small specific areas from San Francisco to Monterey County.

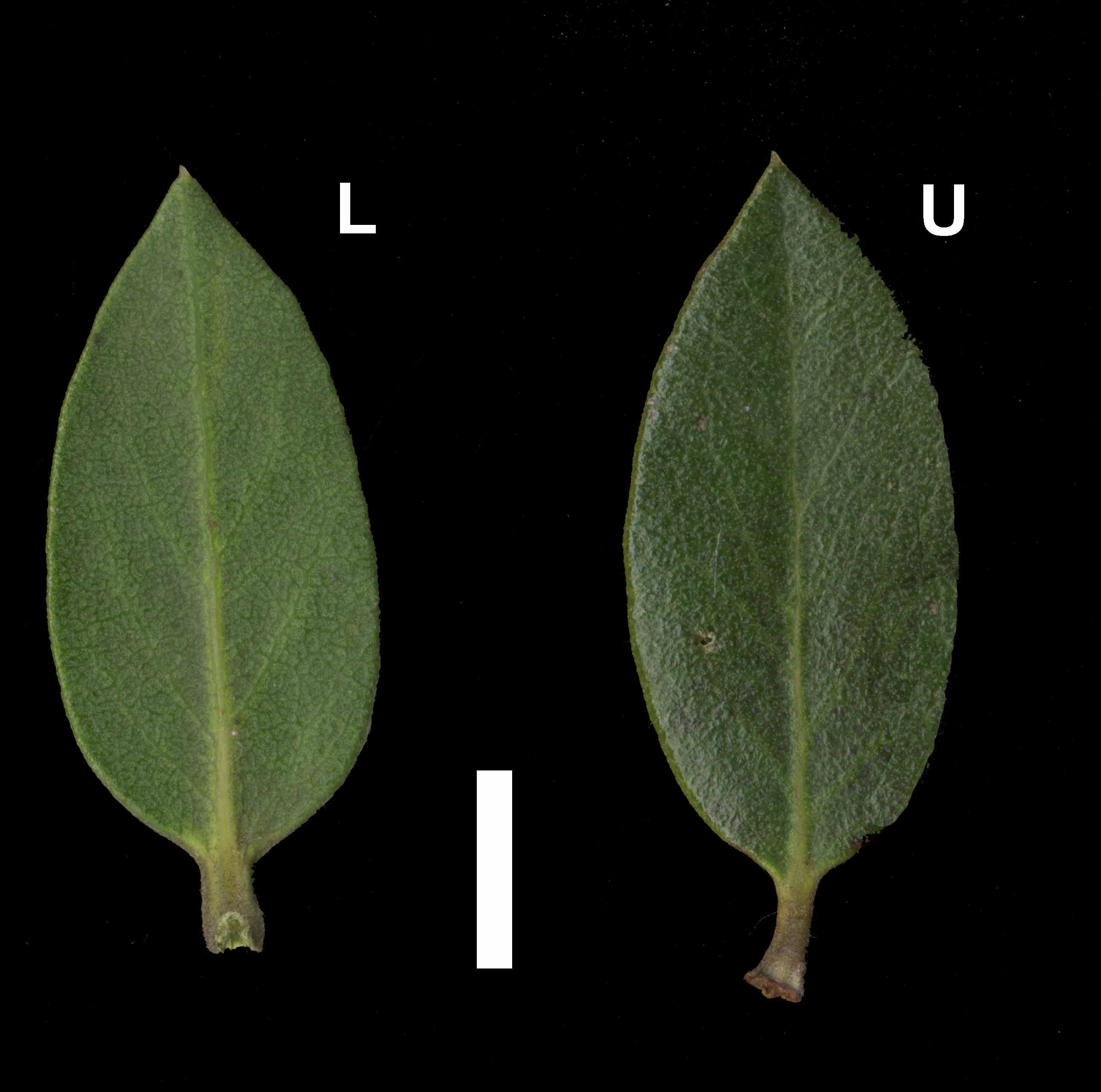
Image of leaf of A. c. rosei. Note the lack of hairs on the leaf underside and the lack of long bristles on the petiole.

- Arctostaphylos crustacea subsp. subcordata — This subspecies' twigs are covered with glandular hairs. It's found in Santa Rosa and Santa Cruz Islands.
