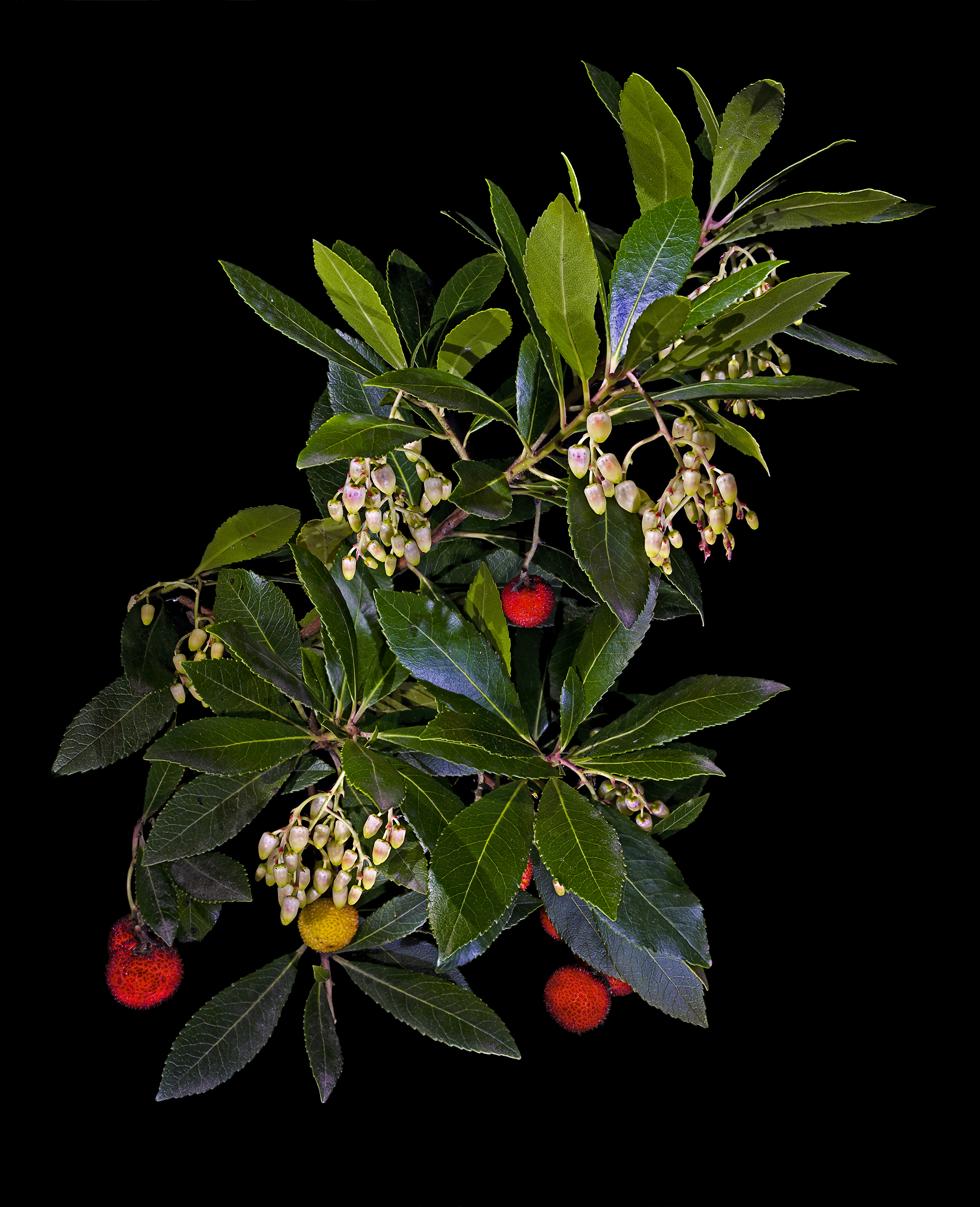
- Arbutus unedo

Scientific classification
- Kingdom: Plantae
- Clade: Embryophytes
- Clade: Tracheophytes
- Clade: Angiosperms
- Clade: Eudicots
- Clade: Asterids
- Order: Ericales
- Family: Ericaceae
- Subfamily: Arbutoideae
- Genus: Arbutus; L.

Type species
- Arbutus unedo L.

Species
- See here

Synonyms
- Unedo Hoffmanns. & Link

= Arbutus =

Genus of flowering plants in the heather family

Arbutus is a genus of 12 accepted species of flowering plants in the family Ericaceae, native to temperate regions of the Mediterranean, western Europe, the Canary Islands and North America, and commonly called madrones, madronas, or strawberry trees. The name Arbutus was taken by taxonomists from Latin, where it referred to the species now designated Arbutus unedo.

== Description ==
=== Vegetative characteristics ===
Arbutus are evergreen trees or shrubs with red flaking bark. The stems can produce lignotubers. The petiolate, bifacial or isofacial, ovate or elliptic leaves are alternate.

=== Generative characteristics ===
The 10-40-flowered racemes or panicles bear bisexual, urceolate flowers with 5 persistent, basally fused sepals. The flower has 5 petals. The androecium is composed of 10 stamens. The gynoecium is composed of 5 carpels with a capitate stigma. The edible, red, globose berry bears 1–5 seeds. Fruit development is delayed for about five months after pollination, so that flowers appear while the previous year's fruit are ripening. Peak flowering for the genus is in April with peak fruiting in October.

== Taxonomy ==
It was described by Carl Linnaeus in 1753. The type species is Arbutus unedo L. It is placed in the subfamily Arbutoideae.

A study published in 2001 which analyzed ribosomal DNA from Arbutus and related genera suggests that Arbutus is paraphyletic and the Mediterranean Basin species of Arbutus are more closely related to Arctostaphylos, Arctous, Comarostaphylis, Ornithostaphylos and Xylococcus than to the western North American species of Arbutus, and that the split between the two groups of species occurred at the Paleogene/Neogene boundary. The 12 species are as follows:

=== Afro-Eurasia ===
- Arbutus andrachne L. – Greek strawberry tree (Southeastern Europe and southwestern Asia)
- Arbutus canariensis Duhamel – Canary madrone (Canary Islands)
- Arbutus pavarii Pampan. (Libya)
- Arbutus unedo L. – strawberry tree (Mediterranean Basin, western France, and western Ireland)

=== Americas ===
- Arbutus arizonica (A.Gray) Sarg. – Arizona madrone (New Mexico, Arizona and western Mexico south to Jalisco)
- Arbutus bicolor S. González, M. González et P. D. Sørensen (Mexico)
- Arbutus madrensis M. González – western Mexico
- Arbutus menziesii Pursh – Pacific madrone (West coast of North America from southern British Columbia to central (less frequently southern) California, on the west slopes of the Sierra Nevada and Pacific Coast Range mountains)
- Arbutus mollis Kunth (Mexico)
- Arbutus occidentalis McVaugh & Rosatti - western Mexico
- Arbutus tessellata (Mexico)
- Arbutus xalapensis Kunth (syn. A. texana, A. glandulosa, A. peninsularis) – Texas madrone (Texas, New Mexico and northeastern Mexico)

=== Hybrids ===
- Arbutus × andrachnoides Link (A. andrachne × A. unedo): this hybrid has gained the Royal Horticultural Society's Award of Garden Merit.
- Arbutus × androsterilis (A. canariensis × A. unedo) in Canary Islands
- Arbutus × thuretiana Demoly (A. andrachne × A. canariensis)
- Arbutus × reyorum [ (A. andrachne × A. canariensis) × A. unedo ]

=== Formerly placed here ===
- Arctostaphylos tomentosa (Pursh) Lindl. (as A. tomentosa Pursh)
- Arctostaphylos uva-ursi (L.) Spreng. (as A. uva-ursi L.)
- Comarostaphylis discolor (Hook.) Diggs (as A. discolor Hook.)
- Gaultheria phillyreifolia (Pers.) Sleumer (as A. phillyreifolia Pers.)

== Ecology ==
Arbutus species are used as food plants by some Lepidoptera species including emperor moth, Pavonia pavonia and the madrone butterfly. The distribution of the latter species is in fact heavily affected by the distribution of the madrone.

== Common names ==
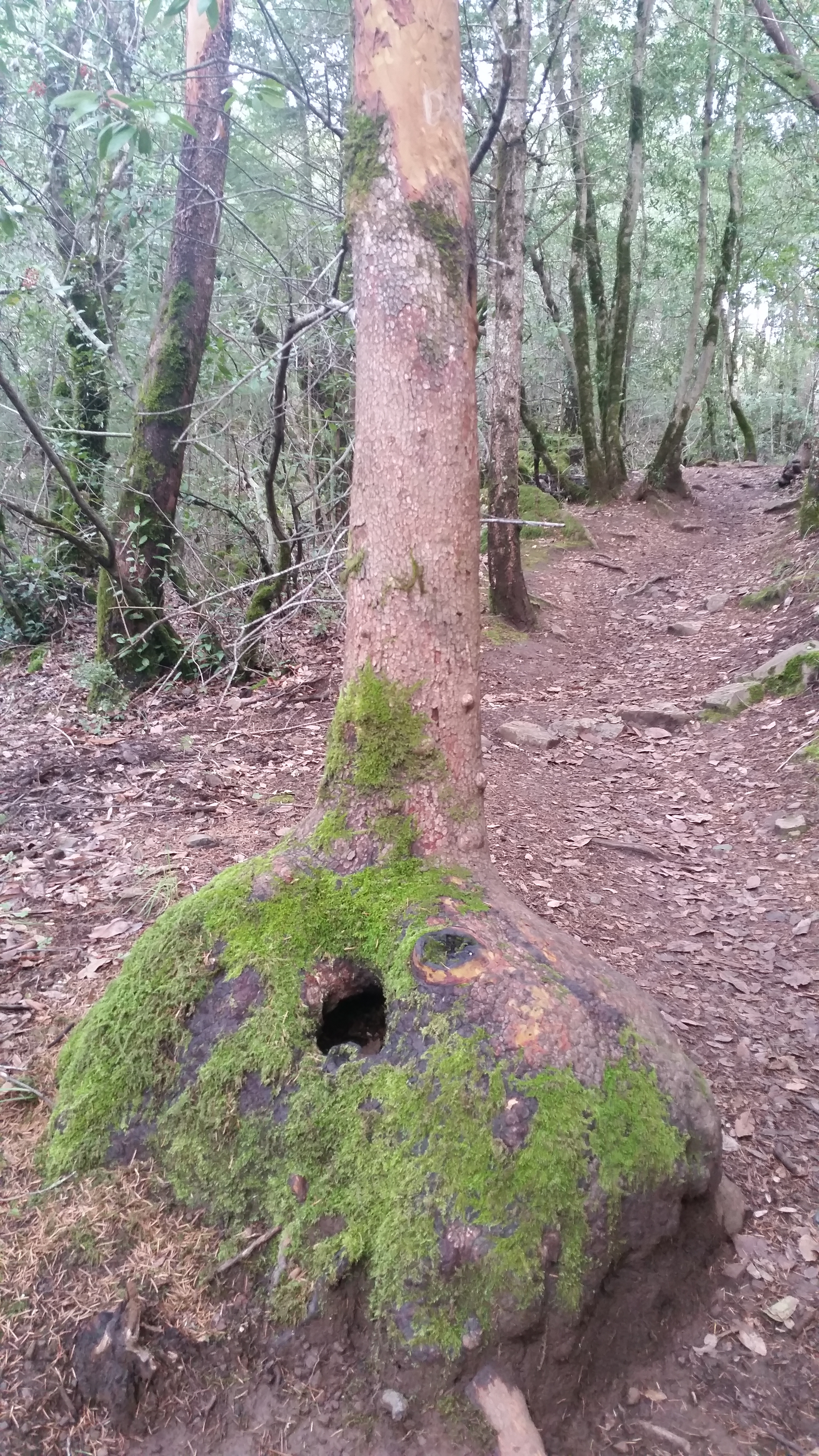
Arbutus menziesii lignotuber near ground level provides fire-resistant storage of energy and sprouting buds if fire damage requires replacement of the trunk or limbs. Note the typically smooth orange bark on the upper portion of the trunk.

Members of the genus are called madrones or madronas in the United States, from the Spanish madroño (Mediterranean strawberry tree). On the south coast of British Columbia, Canada, where the species Arbutus menziesii, native to the Pacific Northwest and Northern and Central California regions is common, Arbutus is commonly used or, rarely and locally, "tick tree". In Oregon and California, it is usually called the madrone, while madrona is the common name in Washington State. Some species in the genera Epigaea, Arctostaphylos and Gaultheria were formerly classified in Arbutus. As a result of its past classification, Epigaea repens (mayflower) has an alternative common name of "trailing Arbutus".

== Uses and symbolism ==
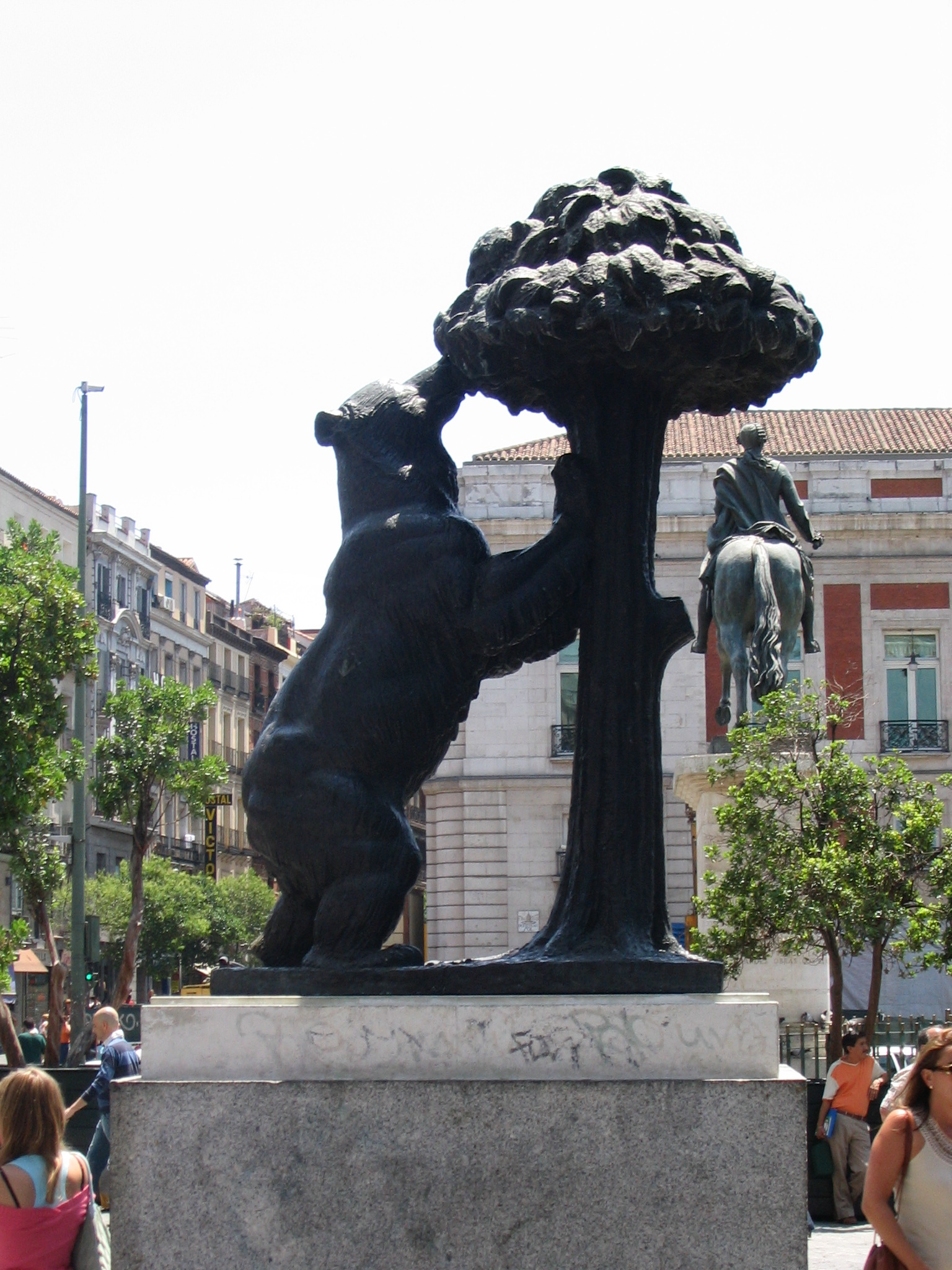
The bear and the tree at Puerta del Sol, Madrid

Several species are widely cultivated as ornamental plants outside of their natural ranges, though cultivation is often difficult due to their intolerance of root disturbance.

The Arbutus unedo tree makes up part of the coat of arms (El oso y el madroño, The Bear and the Strawberry Tree) of the city of Madrid, Spain. A statue of a bear eating the fruit of the madroño tree stands in the center of the city (Puerta del Sol). The image appears on city crests, taxi cabs, man-hole covers, and other city infrastructure.

The Arbutus is important to the Straits Salish people of Vancouver Island, who used Arbutus bark and leaves to create medicines for colds, stomach problems, and tuberculosis, and as the basis for contraceptives. The tree also figures in myths of the Straits Salish.

The fruit is edible but has minimal flavour and is not widely eaten. In Portugal, the fruit is sometimes distilled (legally or not) into a potent brandy known as medronho. In Madrid, the fruit is distilled into madroño, a sweet, fruity liqueur.

Arbutus is a good fuelwood tree since it burns hot and long. Many Pacific Northwest states in the United States use the wood of A. menziesii primarily as a heat source, as the wood holds no value in the production of homes since it does not grow in straight timbers.

The Saanich people of British Columbia have a prohibition against burning Arbutus, due to its salvific role in their creation myths; an Arbutus anchored their canoes to the world during the deluge.

"My love's an Arbutus" is the title of a poem by the Irish writer Alfred Perceval Graves (1846–1931), set to music by his compatriot Charles Villiers Stanford (1852–1924). Graves may have been referring to the Irish strawberry tree, Arbutus unedo, rather than the Arbutus genus in general.

The Canadian songwriter, singer and painter Joni Mitchell (born 1943) includes a reference to the "Arbutus rustling" in her song, "For The Roses". It sounded like applause. She calls the Arbutus tree her "favorite all-time tree". She had one outside her door in a house she built.

"I love arbutuses," celebrated French chef Alain Ducasse, recipient of 20 Michelin stars, has said(24:50). "Yes, I love Arbutus honey. It's sweet honey that's also bitter. I'm obsessed with the bitterness."

The smooth wood of the tree is mentioned by Theophrastus in his Enquiry into Plants (Historia Plantarum) as formerly being used to make weaving spindles. An article on Arbutus tree cultivation in al-Andalus (in Arabic: قُطلُب, romanized: quṭlub) is brought down in Ibn al-'Awwam's 12th-century agricultural work, Book on Agriculture.

== Cultural significance ==
According to the Straits Salish, an anthropomorphic form of pitch would go fishing, but return to shore before it got too hot. One day he was too late getting back to shore and melted from the heat and several anthropomorphic trees rushed to get him – the first was Douglas fir, who took most of the pitch, the grand fir received a small portion, and the madrone received none – which is why they say it still has no pitch.

Also, according to the Great Flood legends of several bands in the northwest, the madrona helped people survive by providing an anchor on top of a mountain for their canoes. Because of this, the Saanich people do not burn madrona out of thanks for saving them.

== Gallery ==
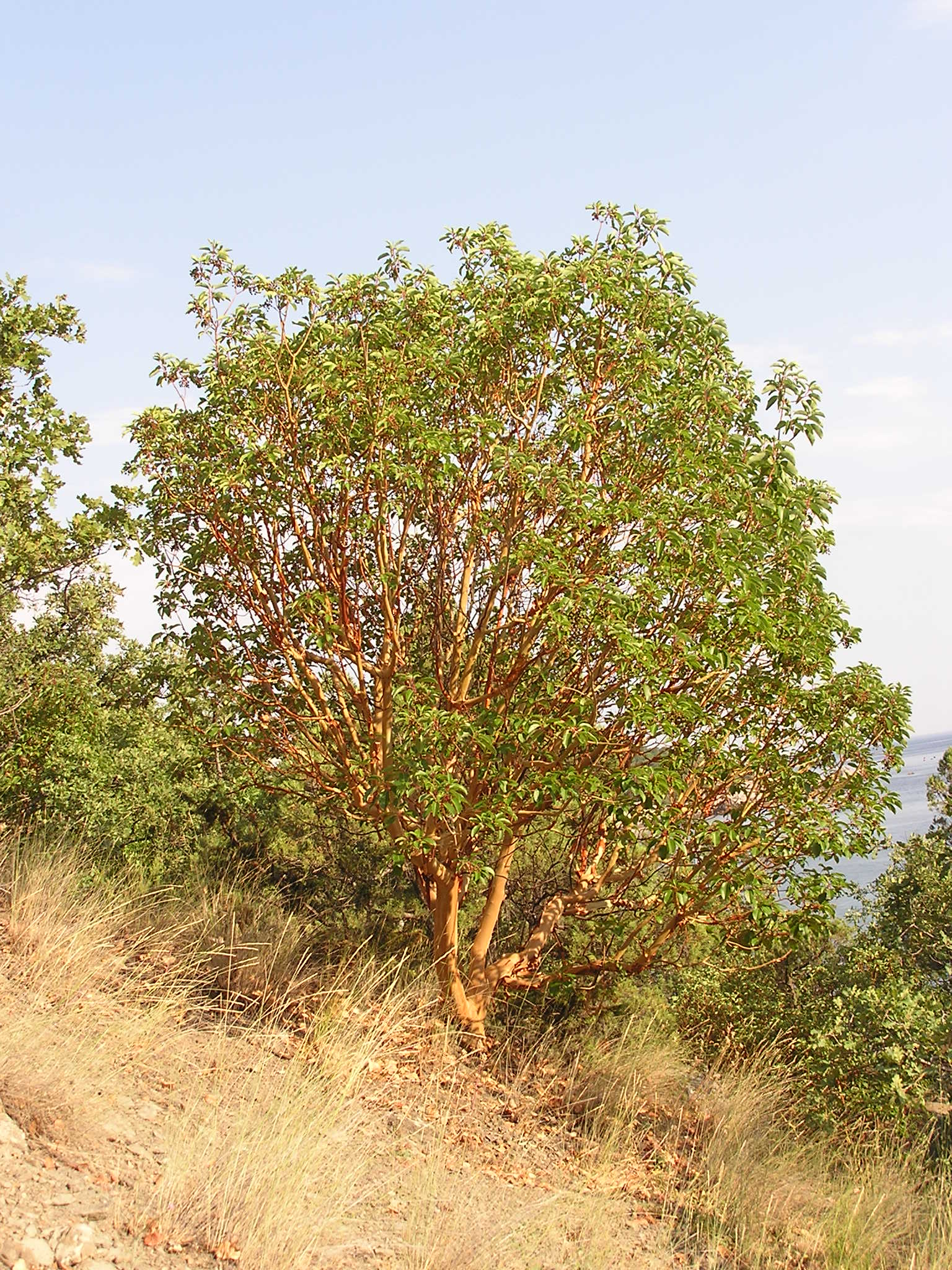
Arbutus andrachne

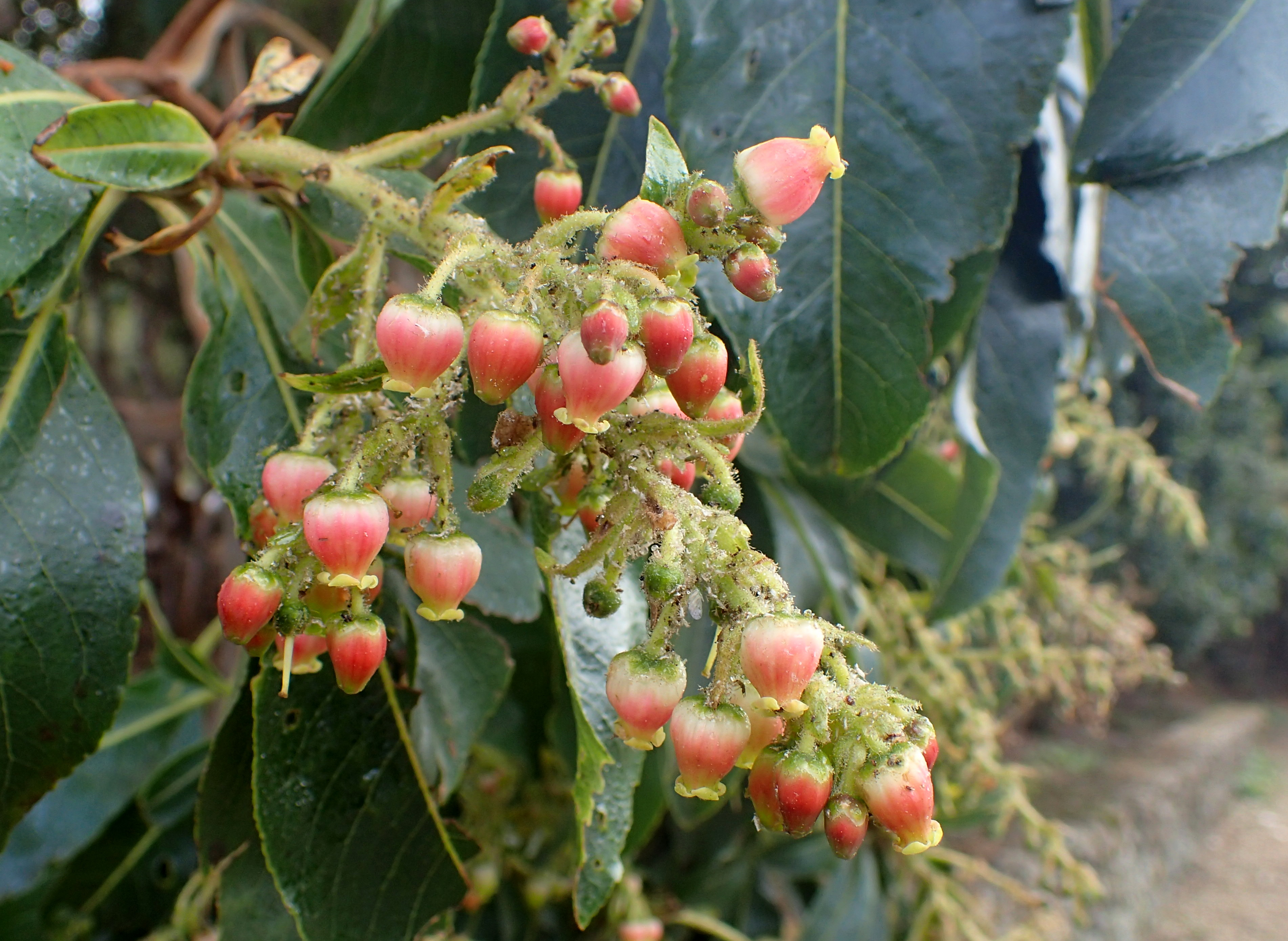
Arbutus canariensis

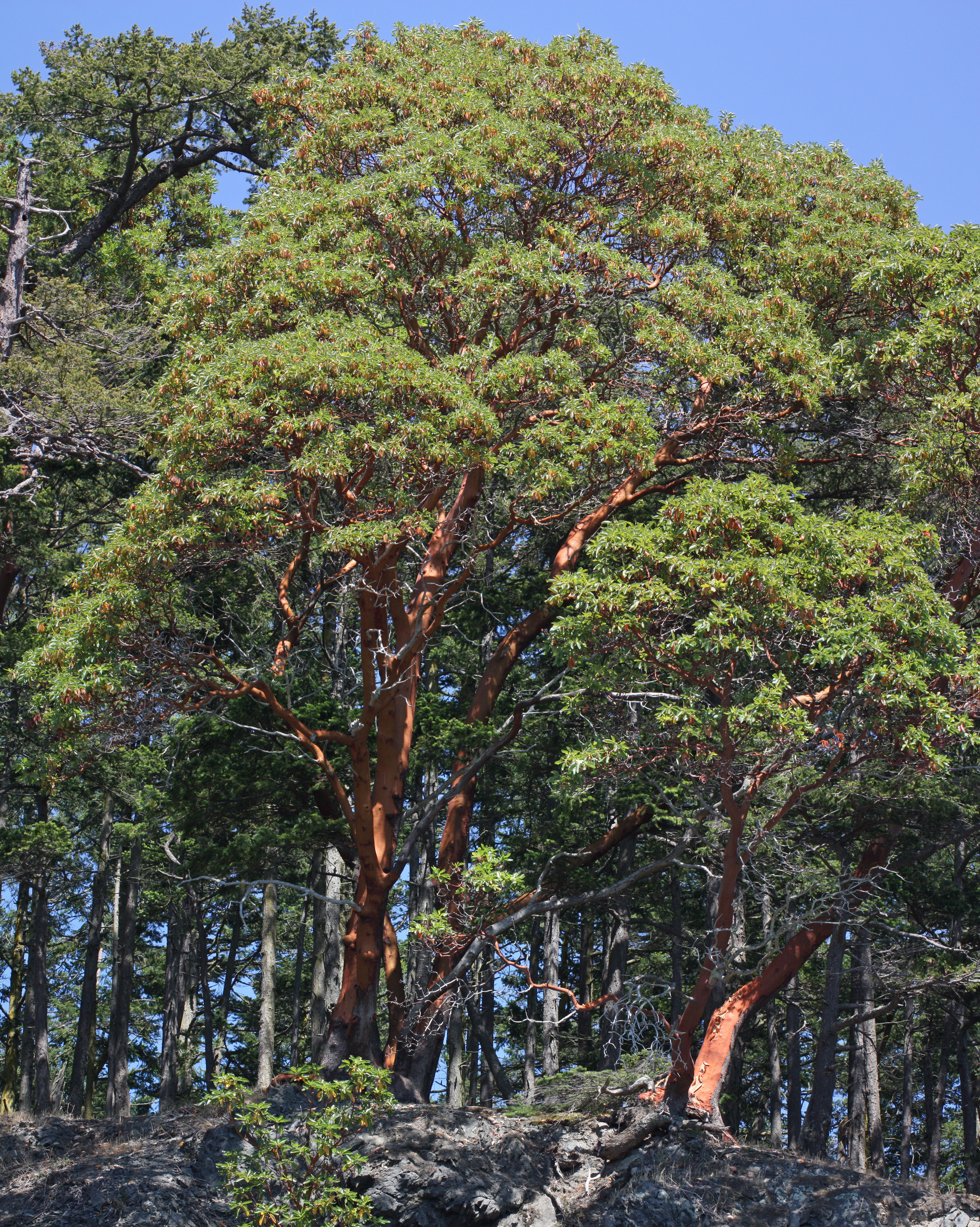
Arbutus menziesii

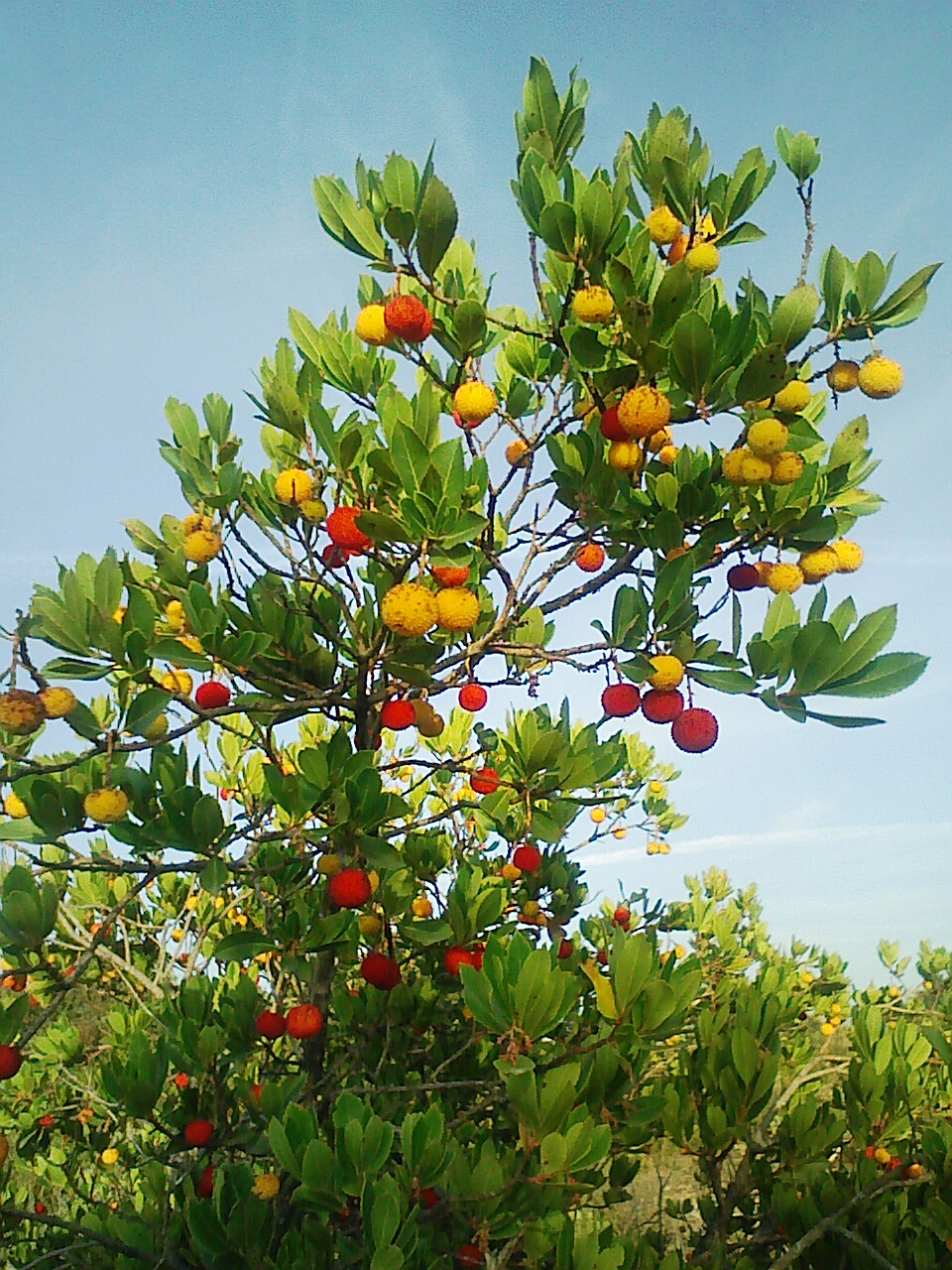
Arbutus unedo

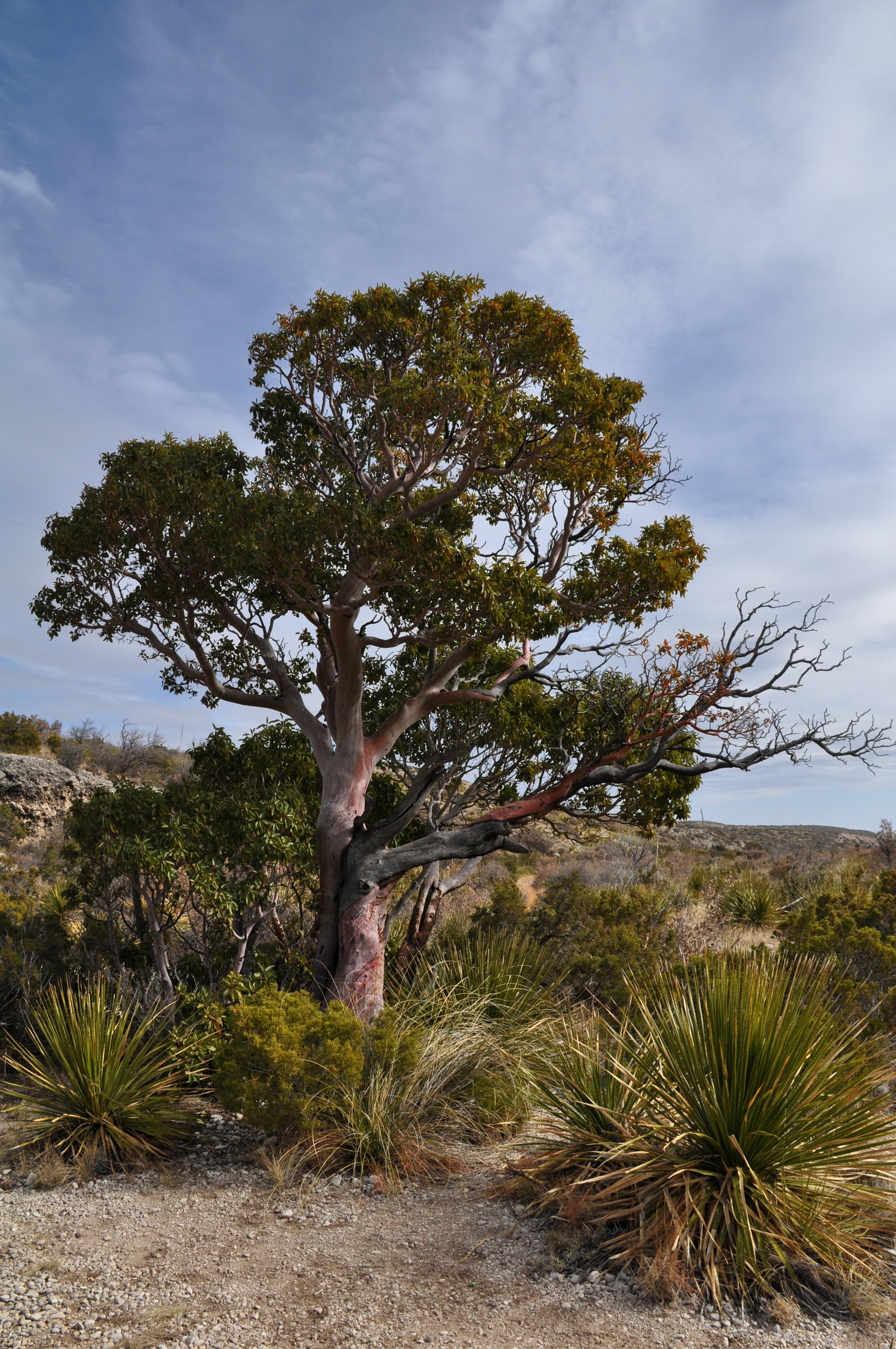
Arbutus xalapensis

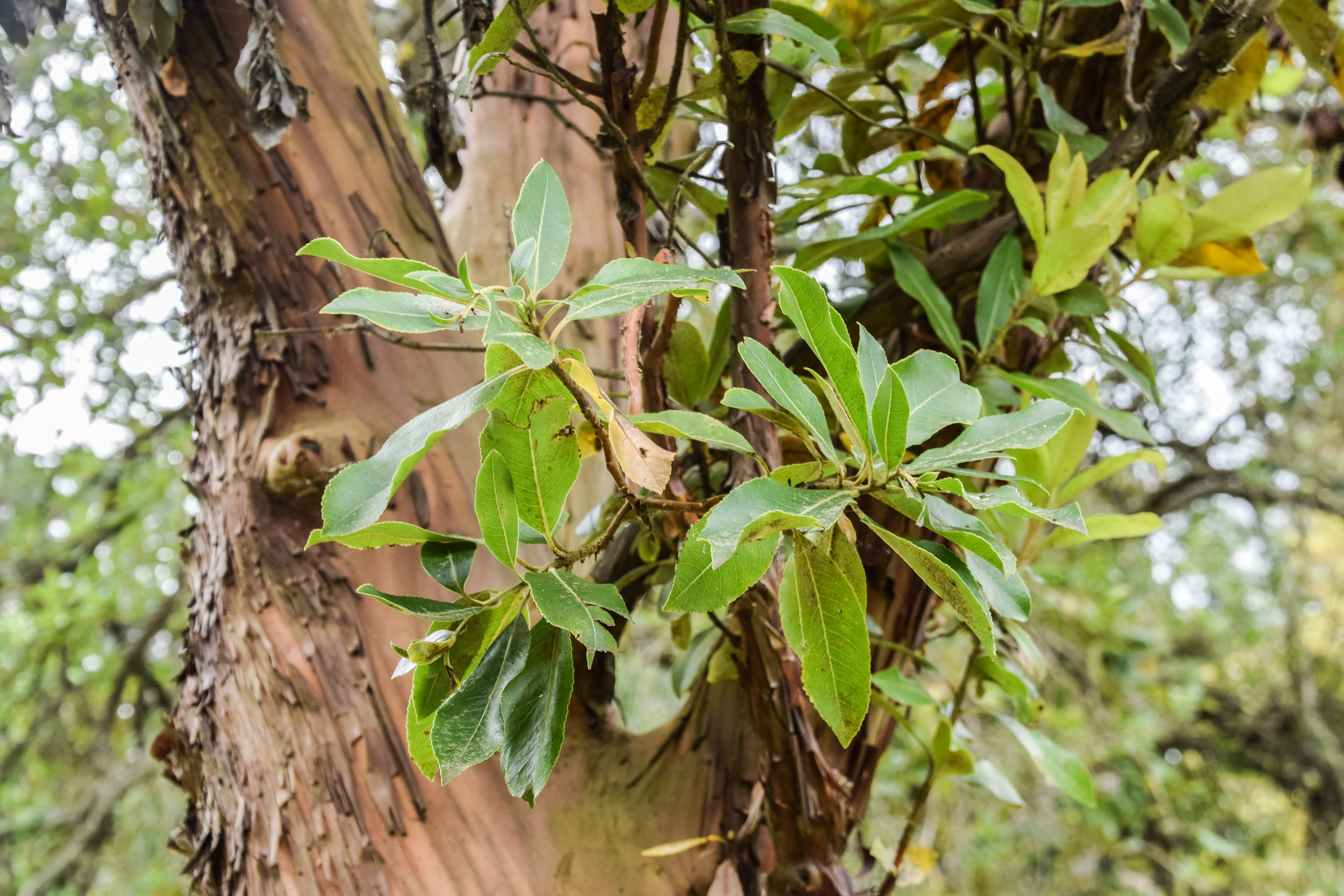
The hybrid Arbutus × andrachnoides

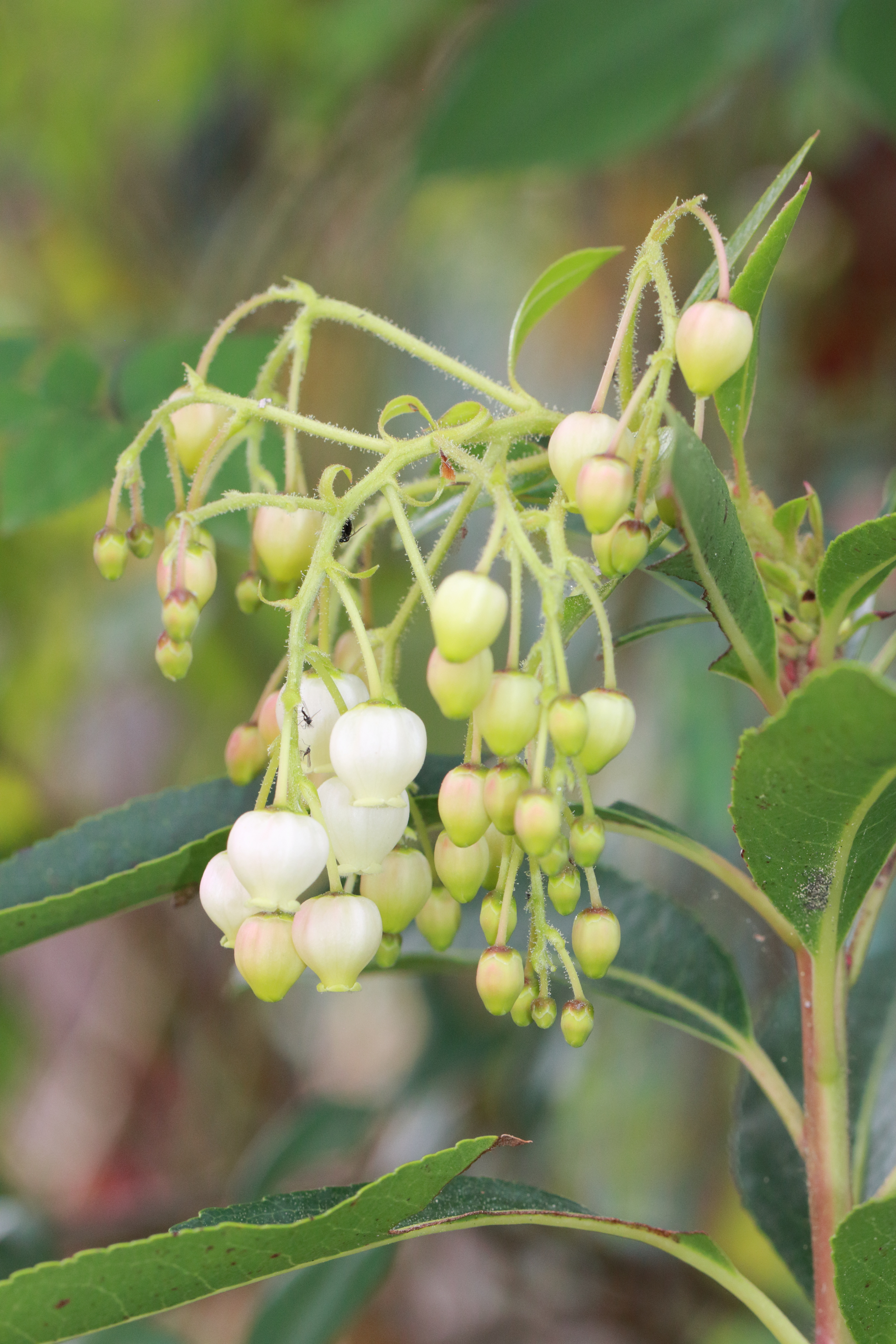
The hybrid Arbutus × thuretiana

== See also ==
- Myrica rubra, a different plant bearing a similar fruit, whose name is sometimes inaccurately translated from Chinese as Arbutus
