= Eutachyptera =

Scientific classification
- Kingdom: Animalia
- Phylum: Arthropoda
- Class: Insecta
- Order: Lepidoptera
- Family: Lasiocampidae
- Genus: Eutachyptera; Barnes & McDunnough, 1912
- Species: E. psidii

Binomial name
- Eutachyptera psidii (Sallé, 1857)

Genus of moths

Eutachyptera is a monotypic moth genus in the family Lasiocampidae. The genus was erected by William Barnes and James Halliday McDunnough in 1912. Its single species, Eutachyptera psidii, was first described by Sallé in 1857. It is found in Mexico.

== Behaviour ==
The caterpillars feed on the leaves of guava (Psidium sp.) and oak. They live communally in large silken nests, which can extend to 50 centimetres (20 in) or more in length. They remain in the nests by day and leave at night to feed, laying a trail of pheromones to help them and their nest-mates navigate to and from feeding areas.

Unusually among caterpillars, E. psidii larvae can remain active for as long as 18 days with no food, which they may have to do when their host trees lose their leaves in winter.

== Use of larvae and silk ==
The larvae are among the caterpillars traded and eaten in Mexico.

The silk nests were used by the Aztecs, Mixtecs and Zapotecs to make a paper-like fabric, which was a commercial item at the time of Moctezuma. Later, the Mixtec and other communities in Oaxaca extracted the silk fibres from the nests and wove them into sashes. This practise had ceased by 1997.

== Synonyms ==
The US National Center for Biotechnology Information lists the following synonyms for E. psidii:

- Bombyx psidii
- Gloveria psidii
- Lasiocampa psidii
- Metanastria psidii
- Tachyptera psidii
