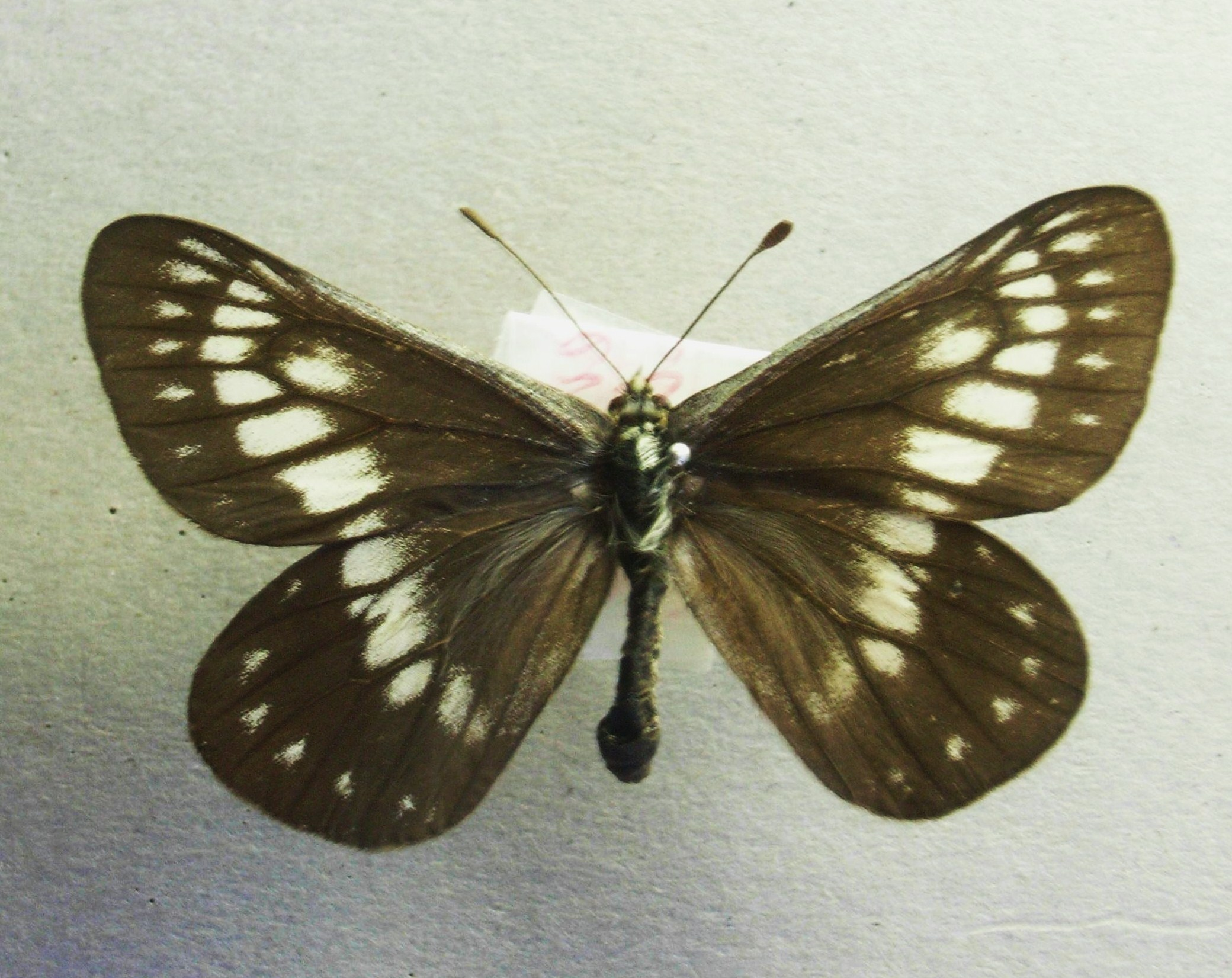
- Female Eucheira socialis

Scientific classification
- Kingdom: Animalia
- Phylum: Arthropoda
- Clade: Pancrustacea
- Class: Insecta
- Order: Lepidoptera
- Family: Pieridae
- Genus: Eucheira
- Species: E. socialis

Binomial name
- Eucheira socialis Westwood, 1834

= Madrone butterfly =

Species of butterfly

Eucheira socialis, commonly known as the madrone butterfly is a lepidopteran that belongs to the family Pieridae. It was first described by John O. Westwood in 1834. Locally known as Mariposa del madroño or tzauhquiocuilin, it is endemic to the highlands of Mexico, and exclusively relies on the madrone (Arbutus spp.) as a host-plant. The species is of considerable interest to lepidopterists due to gregarious nest-building in the larval stages, and heavily male-biased sex ratio. It takes an entire year for this adult butterfly to develop from an egg. The eggs are laid in the month of June and the adults emerge the following May–June. The adults have a black and white pattern on their wings, and the males are generally much smaller and paler than the females. The larvae do not undergo diapause and continue to feed and grow communally in the coldest months of the year. There are two subspecies of E. socialis, named E. socialis socialis and E. socialis westwoodi.

== Distribution ==
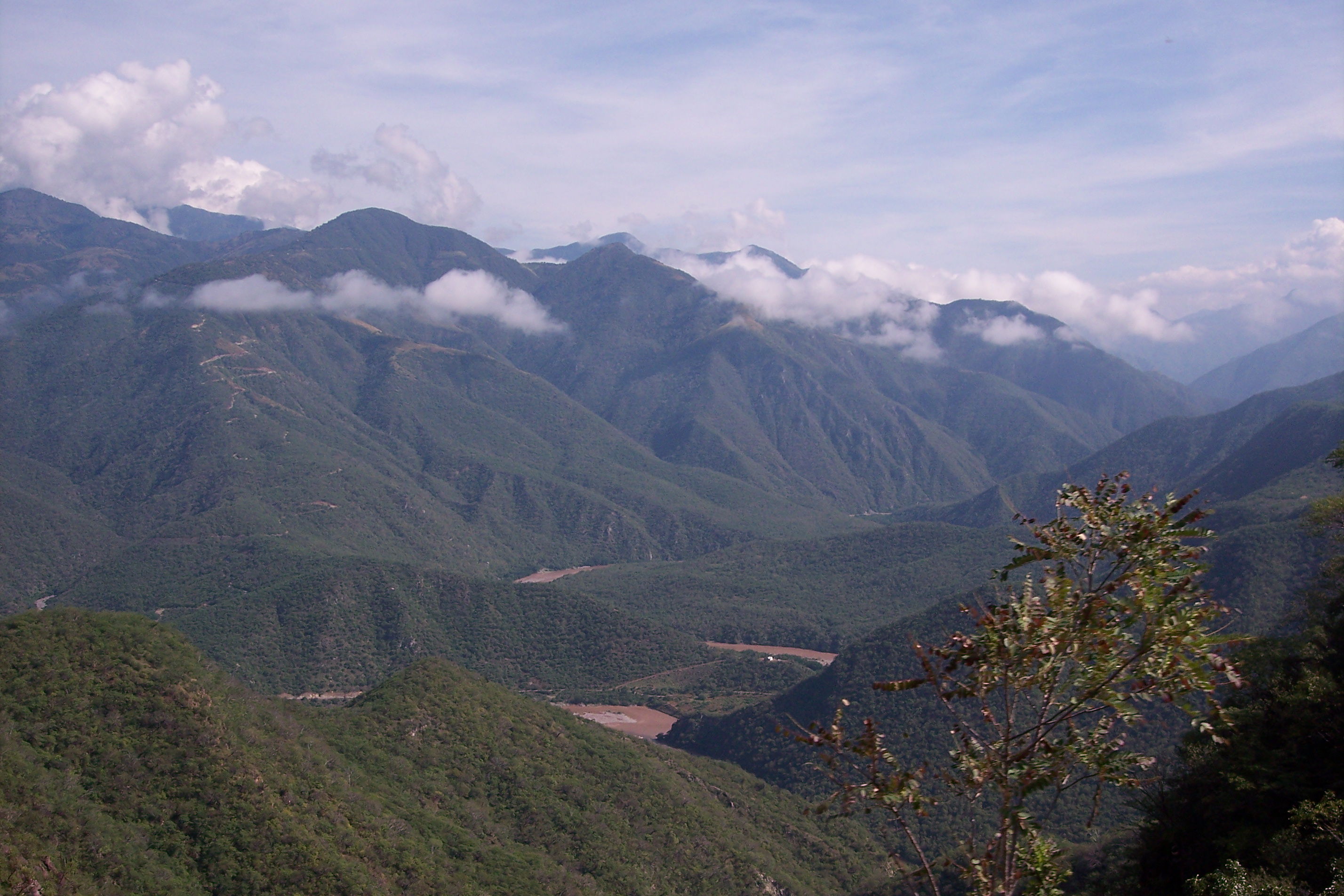
Sierra Madre Occidental, E. socialis habitat in Sonora

The distribution of E. socialis is restricted to the highlands of Mexico at elevations of 1,800 m (5,900 ft) in madrone habitats. They are generally found in pine-oak and arid tropical scrub ecosystems. They are distributed from northern Sonora to Jalisco. E. socialis socialis are found in central Mexico, while E. socialis westwoodi is found in Sierra Madre Occidental in the north. The population distribution is patchy due to the poor dispersal ability of the adults, and the patchy distribution of the host-plant, madrone.

The range of E. socialis is dependent on the availability of their preferred host plant, the madrone. In recent times, the madrone trees have been cut and used as firewood and for making furniture and other crafts. The destruction of the madrone habitat threatens the relationship between the plant and the butterfly. However, the inaccessibility of these habitats due to their confinement in high elevations possibly decreases the risk.

== Life cycle ==
Characteristic of all lepidopterans, E. socialis are holometabolous and go through four distinct developmental stages namely egg, larva, pupa and adult. There are six larval instars and all instars are known to be gregarious. It takes nearly an entire year for the adult to emerge from an egg. The eggs are laid in July, and the adults eventually eclose in May–June. Consequently, there is only one generation of eggs laid each year.

The eggs are bluish-white and are laid in clumps on the underside of the host plant Madrone in the month of June–July. The larvae hatch out of the eggs after approximately 3–4 weeks, sometimes after up to 60 days, in August. Upon hatching, they communally feed on the leaves and terminal branches of the plant. They consume the epidermis and mesophyll and leave the venous skeleton of the leaf intact. The larvae then build their first communal nest by folding these consumed leaves and securing them with silken strands. The larvae are a bright green and mildly fuzzy when they hatch, but turn brown and less pubescent as they grow. There are in total six larval instars. Larval mortality is disproportionately high in males than in females. Despite extremely low temperatures in the winter, the larvae do not undergo diapause, and continue to feed and grow throughout the year. A fully-grown larva is generally between 25 and 30 mm (0.98 and 1.18 in) long, and pupates by April.

The pupae are initially light-green on pupation and later turn yellow. They pupate head down in the silk nests, and lack silken girdle unlike other Pieridae. The black and white adult wing markings are visible through the pupal case. There exists sexual dimorphism in the size of pupa. The male pupae are generally much smaller (18–20 mm (0.71–0.79 in)) than female pupae (21–23 mm (0.83–0.91 in)). Pupal mortality is much higher in females than in males. The pupal stage lasts for about a month and the adults finally emerge in May–June.

Adult butterflies emerge from their nests through the small exits while they are still teneral. Their escape is facilitated by soft, pliable wings. The wings also have an atypical shape and venation patterns adapted to escape the nest. The adults have black and white coloration on the wings, and the pattern is more prominent on the males. The males also are usually much paler and smaller than the females. The males have larger eyes and higher wing venation as compared to the females. The proboscis does not anneal properly post-eclosion and is non-functional.

== Reproduction ==
=== Mating ===
The adults are weak fliers, and display simple sexual behavior. Mating takes place near the communal nests right after the adults emerge from the nests. The females mate only once in their lifetime, and most males fail to find mates.

=== Oviposition ===
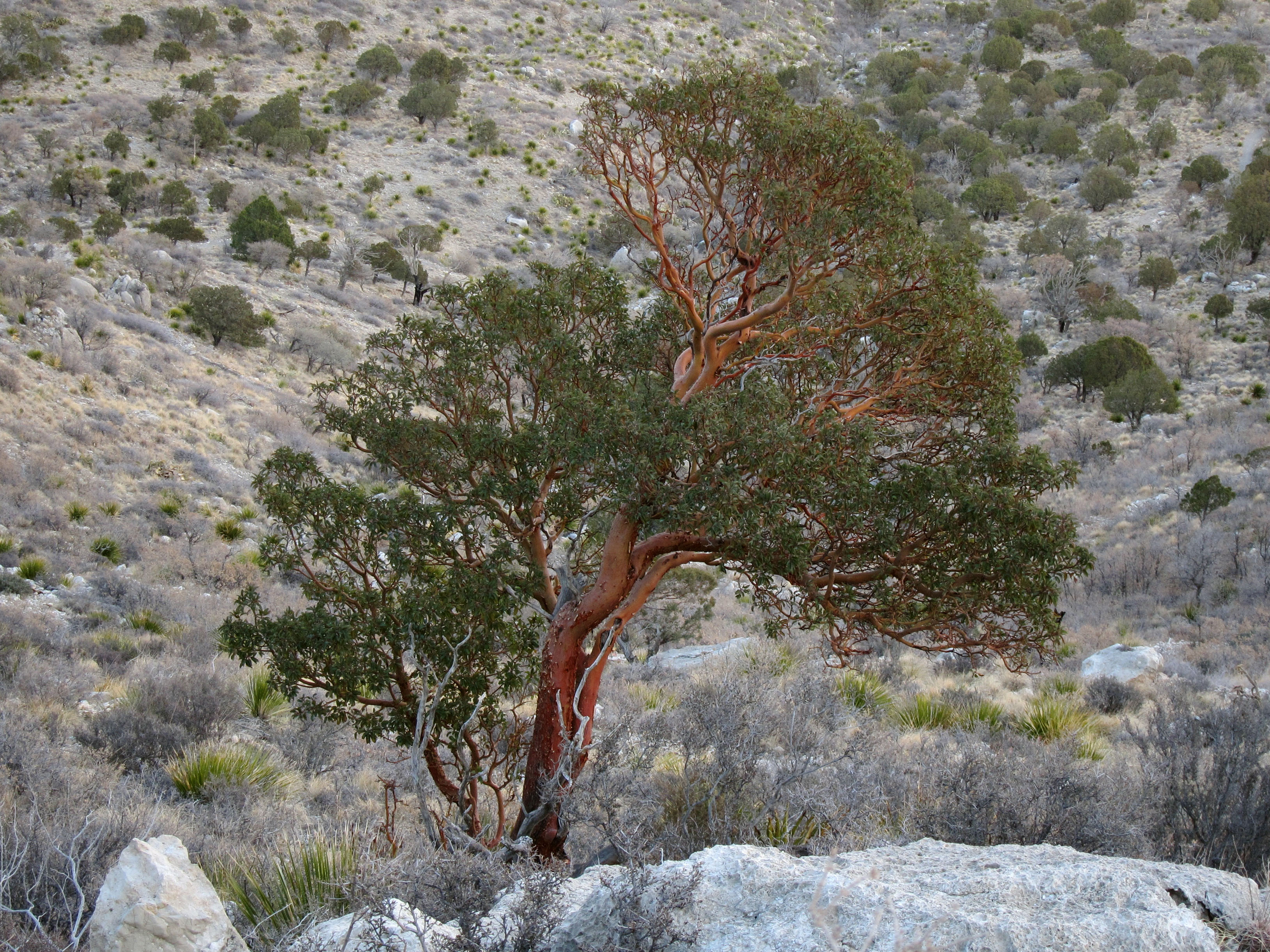
Arbutus xalapensis, a host plant

The females oviposit within 3 hours post-eclosion. They lay their eggs exclusively on the host plant madrone (Arbutus spp.). Though there is much variation in the tree quality of the madrone, the females do not show any preferential oviposition with regard to host plant quality. The eggs are laid in a clump on the undersurface of a single leaf of the madrone. The females mate only once, and consequently, all the eggs in a clump are full siblings. The number of eggs in a clump can vary from very few to as much as 350-400 eggs. The females also tend to lay these egg clumps near other conspecific eggs. It has been observed that isolated clutches tend to suffer from higher mortality than grouped clutches. It is speculated that the ovipositional behavior of the females has been under strong selection in the past to maximize social interaction among larvae.

== Social behavior ==
=== Communal nesting ===
E. socialis caterpillars are social, and they construct communal nests. The freshly hatched larvae forage and rest together, and aggregate in a loosely woven tent-like silk structure over the surface of the leaf. This is called the primary bolsa. Encompassing this structure, the larvae build a secondary bolsa. This secondary nest is very tough and made of multiple layers of interlaced double-stranded silk. By the end of the growing season the nest walls can be thick enough to resist tear and hold water. The larvae maintain the nests constantly, and mend any wear and tear. The entrance and exit to the bolsa is at the bottom of the nest. This protects the shelter from rain and predation and facilitates the removal of excreta and dead larvae. The nests are not reused by later generations.

The nests are roughly pyramidal, but can show great variation in size. The size of the nest correlates with the size of the population. The number of individuals in a nest can vary from as low as 3 individuals to 528 individuals, with an average of about 112 individuals. The survivorship of the larvae is directly proportional to size of the group. Larger groups of larvae tend to forage for longer periods, and gain more weight than larvae from smaller groups.

The construction and maintenance of this nest is essential for survival of the larval species into adulthood. The nest plays an important role in thermoregulation by providing a cool shelter for the larvae on sun-intensive days. The quality of the nest i.e., the thickness of the nest wall correlates with survivorship of the larvae.

Although all the eggs in a clutch are full-siblings, the relatedness among nest-mates is 0.285, which is much lower than 0.5 that is expected amongst full-siblings. This implies that nest-mates are both kin and non-kin, which can be explained by the proximity of clutches in general. Therefore, it is proposed that communal nesting behavior evolved initially due to kin-selection, facilitated by a single oviposition event leading to an egg mass with high-relatedness. But the maintenance of this behavior among non-kin could be due to high benefits of communal nesting such as predator avoidance and thermodynamic efficiency.

=== Communal foraging ===
The later instars are nocturnal and leave their nest for foraging to remote sites an hour or two after sunset. They feed gregariously on the leaves of the host plant until the early hours of morning, and return to the nest before sunrise. The caterpillars in general spin silk whenever they walk, thus the trails that are commonly used are much thicker and stronger than trails that are less-frequented. When presented with alternate trail pathways, there is a strong preference to select for newer and stronger trails. The nocturnal foraging is thought to be an evolutionary response to avoid day-active parasitoids, and predators such as birds and social wasps.

=== Division of labor ===
It has been observed that male E. socialis larvae spend more time spinning silk and lesser amount of time foraging as compared to female larvae. Males were also observed to be more active and the first ones to lead a foraging foray. Thus, the males disproportionately bore more of the cost of silk production and exploration for new trails. It has also been observed that nests with male-biased ratios produced heavier male and female pupae than female-biased nests. There seems to be a sexual division of labor, which explains the observation of highly male-biased nests.

== Genetics ==
=== Genetic structure ===
There is limited polymorphism in the genetic architecture of E. socialis, but sub-populations are highly differentiated. There is an excess of heterozygotes, and moderate levels of relatedness amongst nest-mates within the sub-populations. The high differentiation among sub-populations is thought to have been caused by weak adult dispersal, and patchiness of madrone habitats due to their restriction to higher elevations. The northern and southern populations of E. socialis show strong karyotypic differentiation.

=== Sex-ratio ===
The determination of sex in E. socialis is chromosomal with heterogametic females. But, the primary sex-ratio i.e., the sex-ratio at conception is extremely male-biased with an average of about 70% males. This bias has been observed in both the eastern and western sub-populations, and is thought to be caused by meiotic instability. Furthermore, the operational sex-ratio is also male-biased. Such a ratio is thought to be evolutionarily maintained because of the selective advantage of male-biased groups in the communal nests.

== Physiology ==
=== Thermoregulation ===
Although mating, flight, and oviposition occurs in the warmest and wettest months of the year, much of the growth of the caterpillar occurs in the coldest months of the year. Even though the days are much warmer than the nights in the winter, the caterpillars remain aggregated in their nests and venture out to forage strictly after sunset. Even within the nests, the caterpillars choose to cluster in the coolest regions of the nest. This type of voluntary hypothermia is expected to be an adaptation to foraging in the night.

=== Defenses ===
The species show a general behavioral mechanism to minimize predation and parasitism. The oviposition of the eggs on the underside of the leaves, and nocturnal foraging of larvae decrease exposure to predators and other parasitoids. The final instars of the larvae also exhibit chemical defenses. When threatened, they regurgitate a droplet of brownish-green fluid. This fluid is assumed to be distasteful to predators, and has been described as having a ‘bitter’ and ‘nutty’ flavor. The fluid also contains alkaloids, such as arbutin.

== Human interactions ==
=== Use of silk nests ===
The silk nests built by the larvae are believed to have been used in the past for making a paper-like fabric and small boxes. They also served as a base for paintings, and for bandaging wounds. The entire nests have also been recorded to be used as purses and as a container for liquid.

The Mixtec and other communities in Oaxaca extracted the silk fibres from the nests and wove them into sashes. This practise had ceased by 1997.

=== Use as food source ===
The larva of E. socialis is one of the many lepidopterans consumed in Mexico. In some part of Huasteca, the silk nests are maintained on the edge of roof tops of houses. Like other Lepidopteran larvae, they are used in a variety of dishes such as tortilla, omelets, pies and rice. They are perceived as ‘good’ and ‘nutritious’ food due to their high protein content. In the Mixteca region of Oaxaca, excessive consumption of the larvae led to the disappearance of the species from this region. However, it has been reintroduced into this region from the state of Mexico and Durango.
