= Cameraria arizonella =

Scientific classification
- Kingdom: Animalia
- Phylum: Arthropoda
- Clade: Pancrustacea
- Class: Insecta
- Order: Lepidoptera
- Family: Gracillariidae
- Genus: Cameraria
- Species: C. arizonella

Binomial name
- Cameraria arizonella (Braun, 1925)

Synonyms
- Lithocolletis arizonella Braun, 1925; Phyllonorycter arizonella (Braun, 1925)

Species of moth

Cameraria arizonella is a moth of the family Gracillariidae. It is known from Arizona, United States. It was moved from Phyllonorycter to Cameraria in a 2020 revision of these two genera.

The wingspan is 8.5–9 mm (0.33–0.35 in). Cameraria arizonella mines leaves of Arbutus arizonica, forming mines that appear as flat blotches on the upper surface of the leaf.
