= Arbutus occidentalis =

Scientific classification
- Kingdom: Plantae
- Clade: Tracheophytes
- Clade: Angiosperms
- Clade: Eudicots
- Clade: Asterids
- Order: Ericales
- Family: Ericaceae
- Genus: Arbutus
- Species: A. occidentalis

Binomial name
- Arbutus occidentalis McVaugh & Rosatti 1978

Species of flowering plant

Arbutus occidentalis or the Mexican madrone is a small tree species in the heath family, that is endemic to Mexico. It is only known from a few areas in Western Mexico where it grows on rocky slopes. It produces red edible berries that are valuable food to wildlife.

== Distribution ==
The plant is found in montane Mexico from Chihuahua to Oaxaca. It is found in pine forests, spreading on cliff summits and steep rocky slopes.

== Description ==
Arbutus occidentalis is a low growing shrub, growing 0.25–1 metre (0.82–3.28 ft) in height. In places it forms colonies more than 6 feet (1.8 m) ) wide.

The branches are covered with thin red bark. Leaves are 3–6 centimetres (1.2–2.4 in) long, by 1–2 centimetres (0.39–0.79 in) wide. They have teeth along the edges.

The red fruits are about 0.5 inches (13 mm) across and fleshy.

=== Variations ===
Two regional variations of Arbutus occidentalis were formerly distinguished as varieties:

- Arbutus occidentalis var. occidentalis —almost smooth leaved, located in Central Mexico from Durango to Jalisco in the Sierra Madre Occidental.
- Arbutus occidentalis var. villosa — leaves copiously covered beneath with wooly, villous hairs, located further south from Michoacan to Oaxaca in the Sierra Madre del Sur mountains.
