= Arbutus mollis =

Scientific classification
- Kingdom: Plantae
- Clade: Tracheophytes
- Clade: Angiosperms
- Clade: Eudicots
- Clade: Asterids
- Order: Ericales
- Family: Ericaceae
- Genus: Arbutus
- Species: A. mollis

Binomial name
- Arbutus mollis Kunth

Species of plant

Arbutus mollis is a species of plant in the heath family. It is found in Mexico.
