= Arbutus madrensis =

Scientific classification
- Kingdom: Plantae
- Clade: Tracheophytes
- Clade: Angiosperms
- Clade: Eudicots
- Clade: Asterids
- Order: Ericales
- Family: Ericaceae
- Genus: Arbutus
- Species: A. madrensis

Binomial name
- Arbutus madrensis M. González

Species of tree

Arbutus madrensis is a Mexican species of trees in the heath family. It is found in the Sierra Madre Occidental of Durango, Jalisco, Nayarit, and Sinaloa in western Mexico.
