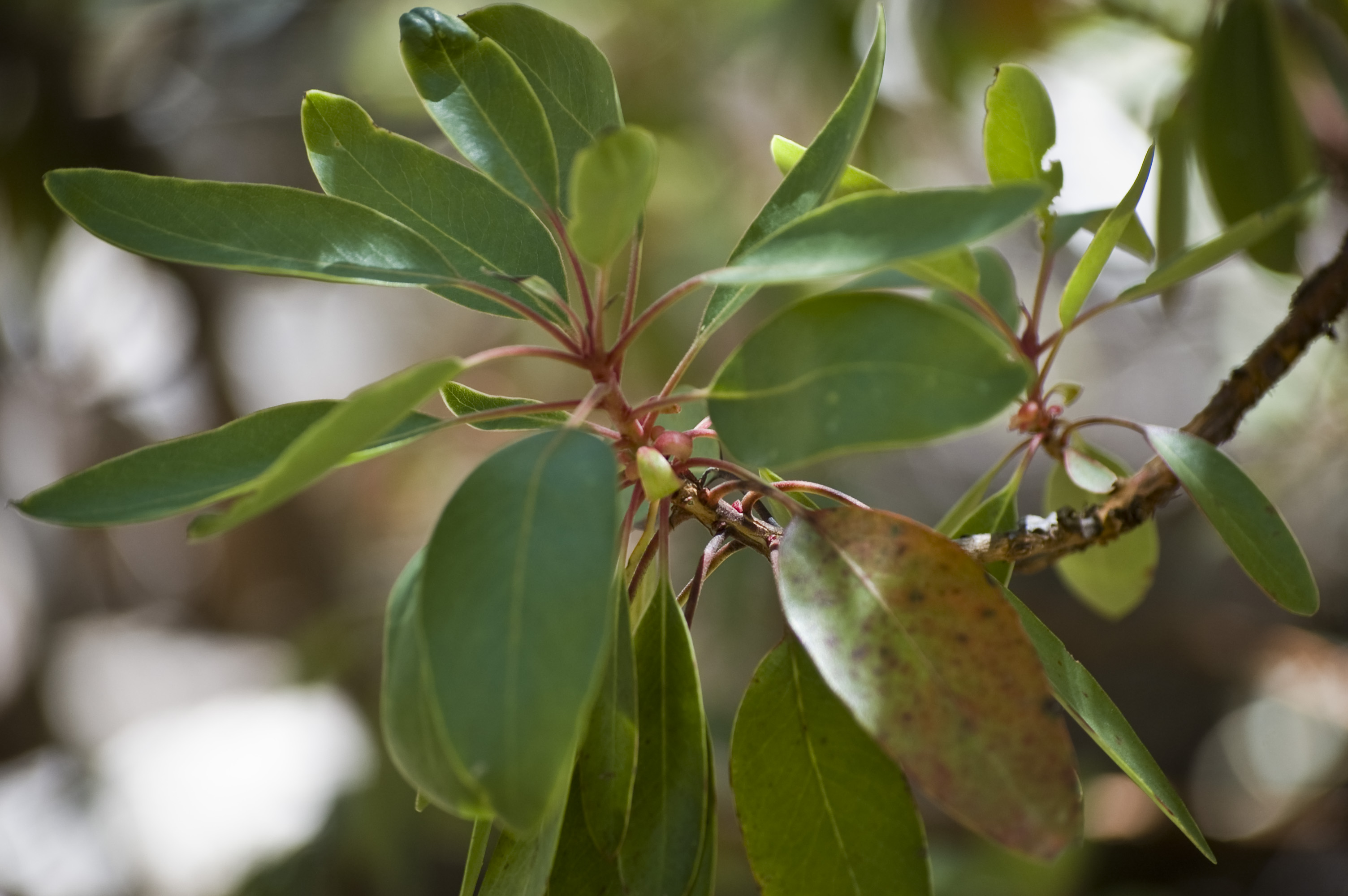
- Arbutus arizonica foliage

Conservation status
- Least Concern (IUCN 3.1)

- Apparently Secure (NatureServe)

Scientific classification
- Kingdom: Plantae
- Clade: Tracheophytes
- Clade: Angiosperms
- Clade: Eudicots
- Clade: Asterids
- Order: Ericales
- Family: Ericaceae
- Genus: Arbutus
- Species: A. arizonica

Binomial name
- Arbutus arizonica (A.Gray) Sarg. 1891
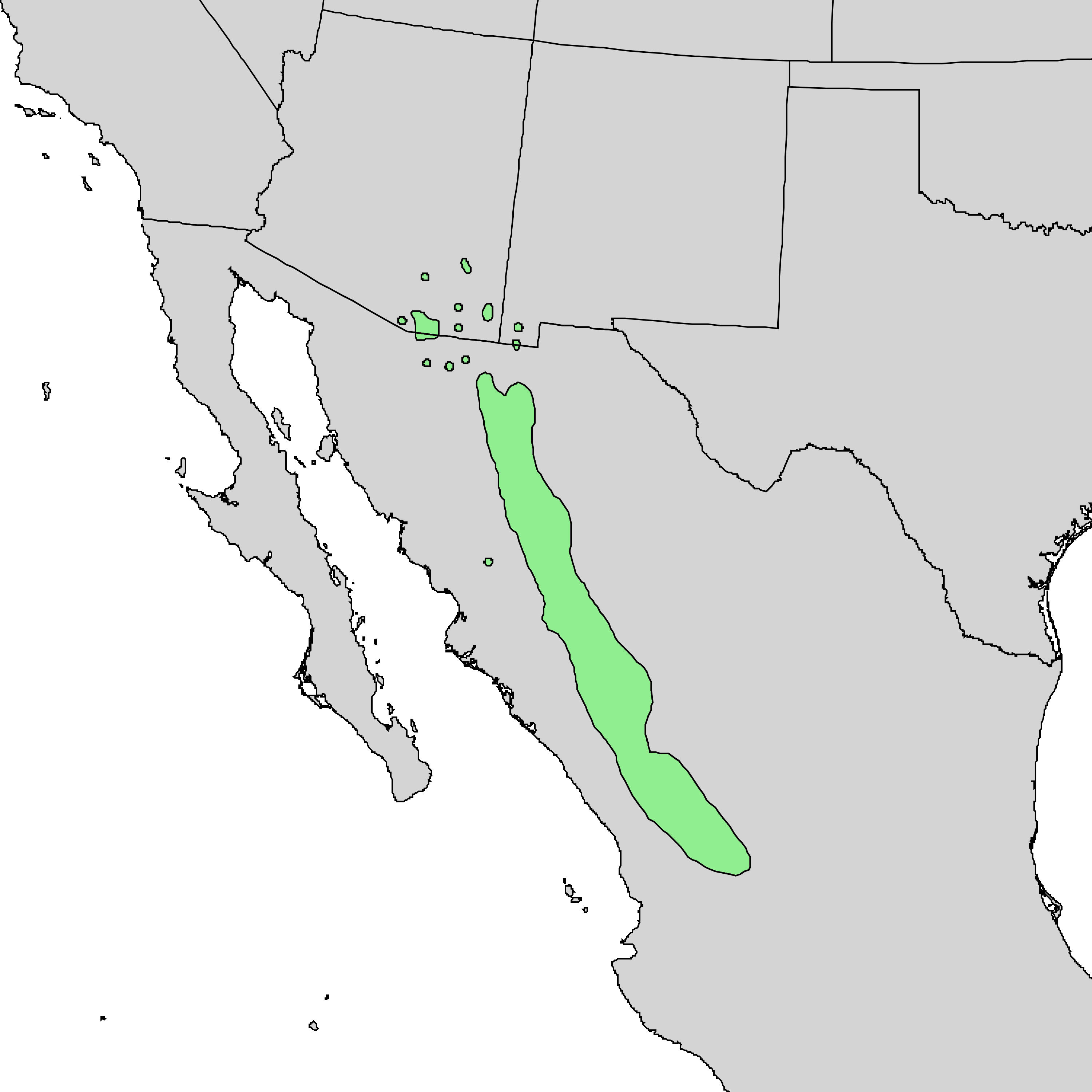
- Natural range of Arbutus arizonica

Synonyms
- A. xalapensis var. arizonica A.Gray 1886

= Arbutus arizonica =

Arizona madrone

Species of tree

Arbutus arizonica, commonly known as Arizona madrone, is a tree species in the heath family that is native to the southwestern United States and northwestern Mexico. Its range extends along the Sierra Madre Occidental cordillera from the Madrean Sky Islands of southeastern Arizona and southwestern New Mexico south as far as Jalisco. It has been found in Sonora, Chihuahua, Durango, and Sinaloa, with one isolated population in Tamaulipas.

Arbutus arizonica is a tree that grows up to 14 m (45 ft), and has pinkish-brown bark. The fruit is an orange-red berry. The fruits are edible by humans and used by some indigenous peoples.

Larvae of the moth Cameraria arizonella mine leaves of Arbutus arizonica.
