= Paul Davidson Sørensen =

American botanist

Paul Davidson Sørensen (born 1934) is an American botanist.
