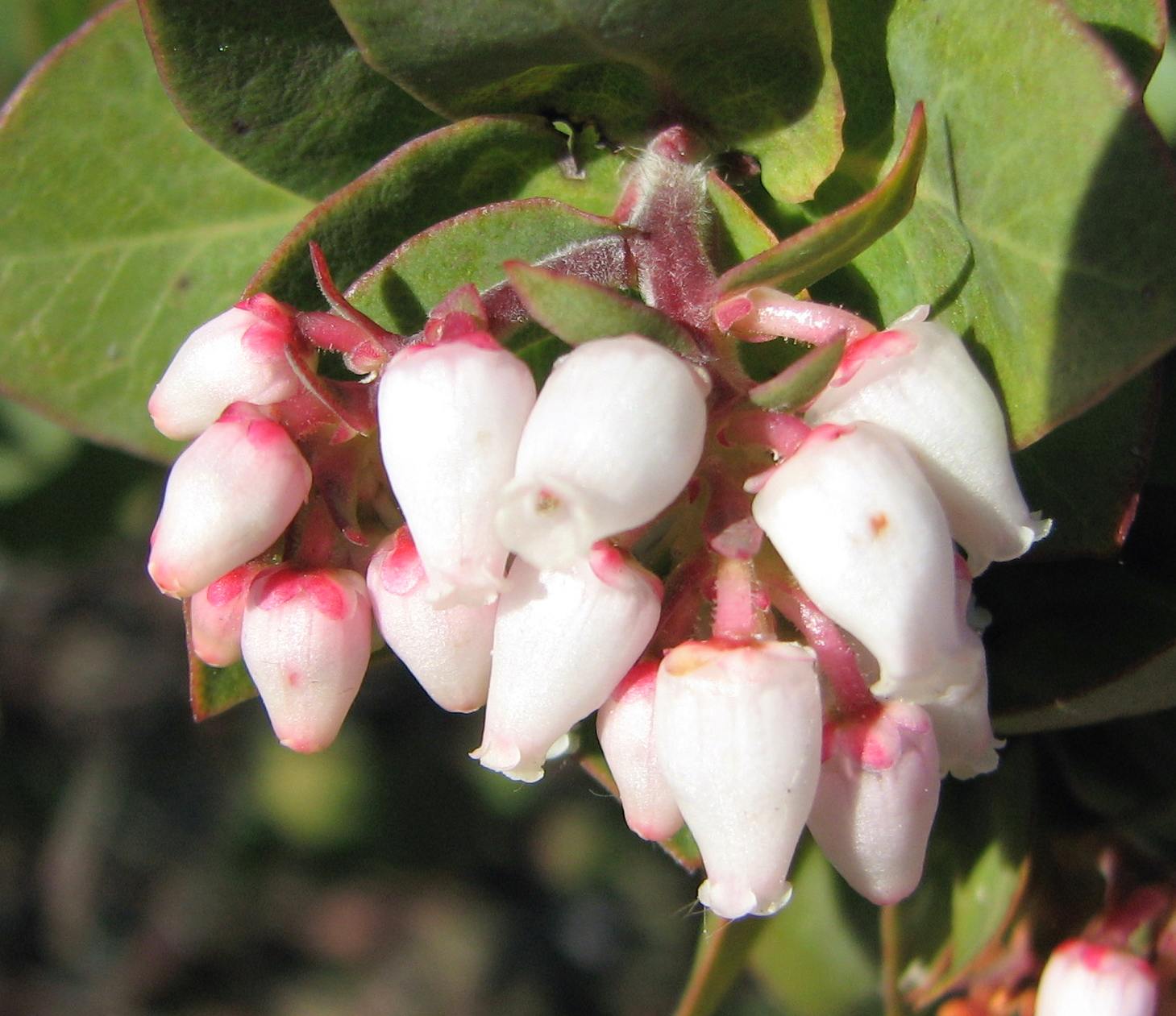
- subsp. crustacea
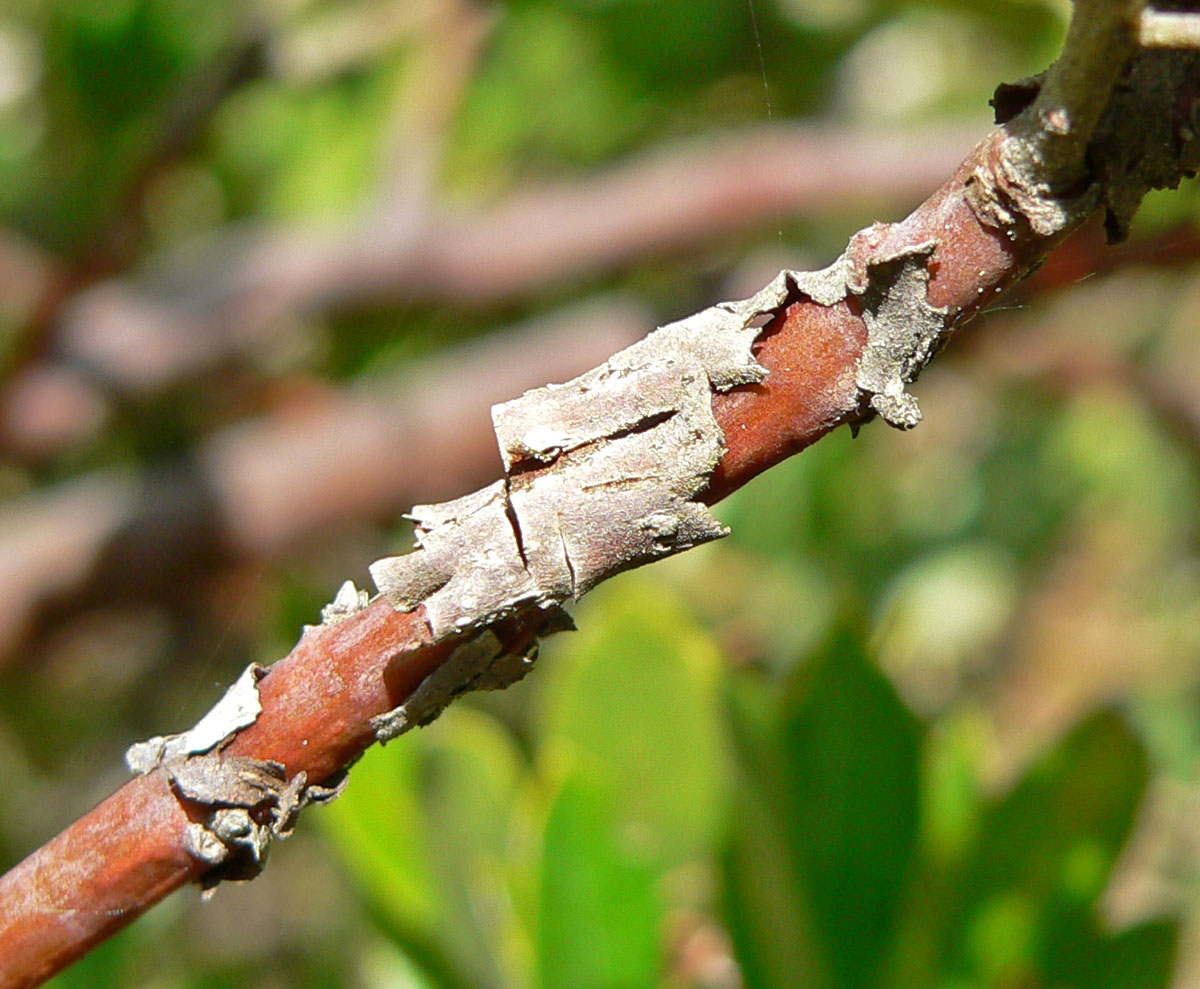
- subsp. insulicola

Scientific classification
- Kingdom: Plantae
- Clade: Tracheophytes
- Clade: Angiosperms
- Clade: Eudicots
- Clade: Asterids
- Order: Ericales
- Family: Ericaceae
- Genus: Arctostaphylos
- Species: A. tomentosa

Binomial name
- Arctostaphylos tomentosa (Pursh) Lindl.

Synonyms
- Arbutus tomentosa Pursh

= Arctostaphylos tomentosa =

Species of flowering plant

Arctostaphylos tomentosa is a species of manzanita known by the common name woollyleaf manzanita or woolley manzanita. This shrub is endemic to California.

It is a resident of chaparral canyons, foothills, and lower-elevation mountains. One specialized habitat in which A. tomentosa is found is the Monterey Cypress forests at Point Lobos and Del Monte Forest in Monterey County, California.

== Description ==
This is a low-lying, spreading manzanita, generally quite a bit wider than it is tall. It is a variable species and even some of the subspecies can vary in appearance across individuals. The stems may be red or gray or both, with smooth, rough, or shreddy bark, hairless to quite bristly. The leaves may be oval to lance-shaped and sometimes toothed, but the upper surface is generally darker and shinier than the lower.

The flowers are white to pink and may be hairy or hairless inside. The fruits are fuzzy reddish drupes under a centimeter in diameter.

== Subspecies ==
There are many subspecies:

- A. tomentosa subsp. bracteosa — uncommon subspecies from the vicinity of Monterey
- A. tomentosa subsp. daciticola — (dacite manzanita), from San Luis Obispo County.
- A. tomentosa ssp. hebeclada — from southwestern Santa Cruz Mountains.
- A. tomentosa subsp. tomentosa — found along the Central Coast.

== See also ==
- California chaparral and woodlands — ecoregion.
  - California coastal sage and chaparral — subregion.
  - California montane chaparral and woodlands — subregion.
