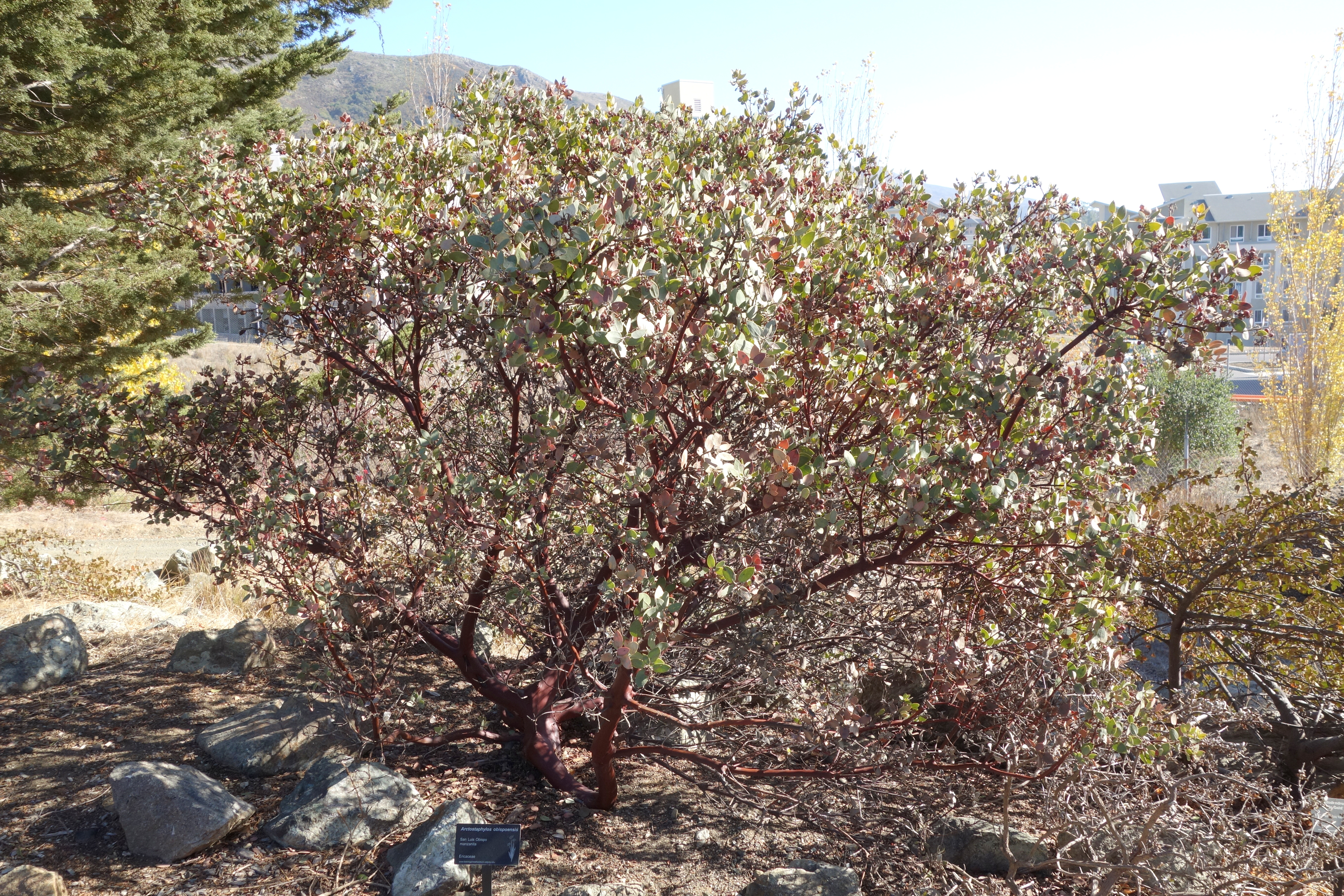

Conservation status
- Apparently Secure (NatureServe)

Scientific classification
- Kingdom: Plantae
- Clade: Tracheophytes
- Clade: Angiosperms
- Clade: Eudicots
- Clade: Asterids
- Order: Ericales
- Family: Ericaceae
- Genus: Arctostaphylos
- Species: A. obispoensis

Binomial name
- Arctostaphylos obispoensis Eastw.

= Arctostaphylos obispoensis =

Species of tree

Arctostaphylos obispoensis is a species of manzanita, known by the common names bishop manzanita and serpentine manzanita, endemic to California.

== Distribution ==
The plant is endemic to the southern Santa Lucia Mountains, in the Central Coast region of California. It is found primarily in San Luis Obispo County, and extends into southern Monterey County.

It grows in chaparral and closed-cone pine forest habitats, usually on serpentine soil. It is found at elevations of 60–950 metres (200–3,120 ft).

Conservation

It is protected within the Cuesta Ridge Botanical Special Interest Area of the Los Padres National Forest, growing in the endemic Sargent cypress (Cupressus sargentii) forest. The species is listed on the California Native Plant Society Inventory of Rare and Endangered Plants as a rare but not currently endangered species.

== Description ==
Arctostaphylos obispoensis is an upright shrub or multi-trunked tree growing to 1–4 metres (3.3–13.1 ft) in height.

The small branches and newer leaves are woolly. The mature leaves are glaucous-gray, hairless, and oblong (northern range) to widely lance-shaped (southern range), and up to 4.5 centimeters long.

The inflorescence is a dense cluster of white urn-shaped and downward facing "manzanita" flowers.

The red fruit is a round waxy drupe, 9–14 millimetres (0.35–0.55 in) in diameter.

== See also ==
- Arctostaphylos luciana — range adjacent on west side of Cuesta Ridge
- Arctostaphylos pilosula — range adjacent on east side of Cuesta Ridge
- Natural history of the California chaparral and woodlands
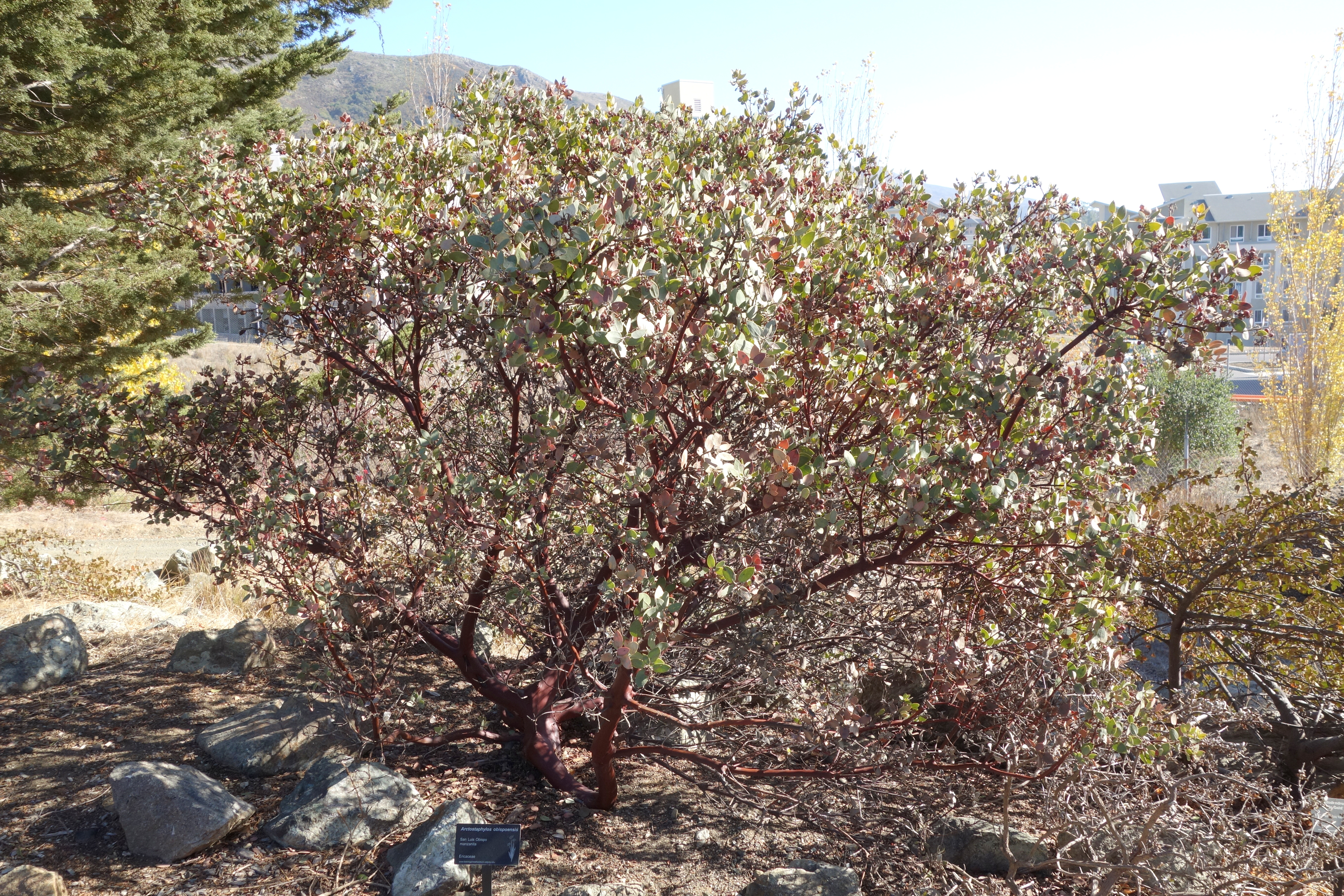
Leaning Pine Arboretum

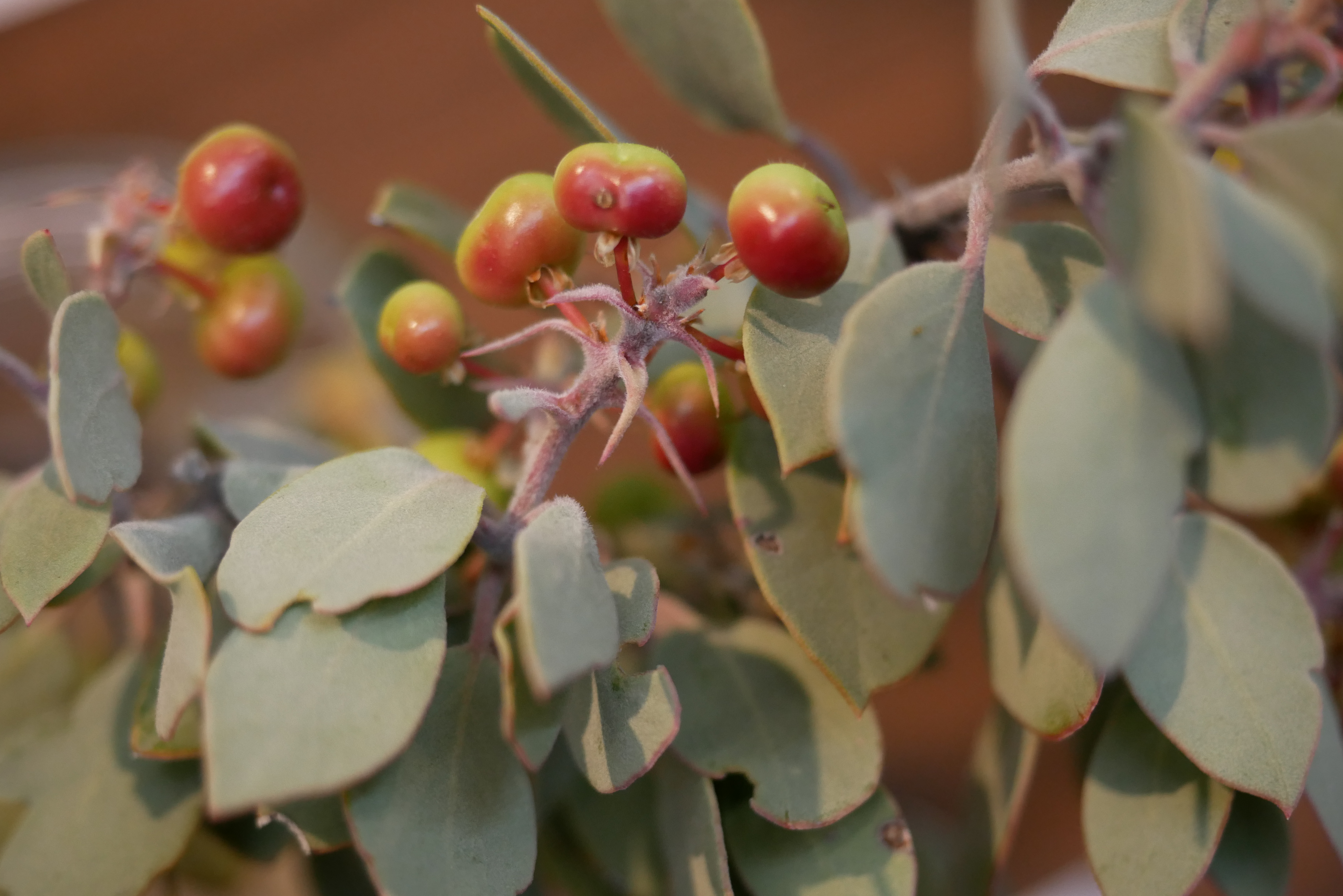
Ericaveae Bishop Manzanita Arclostaphylos obispoensis

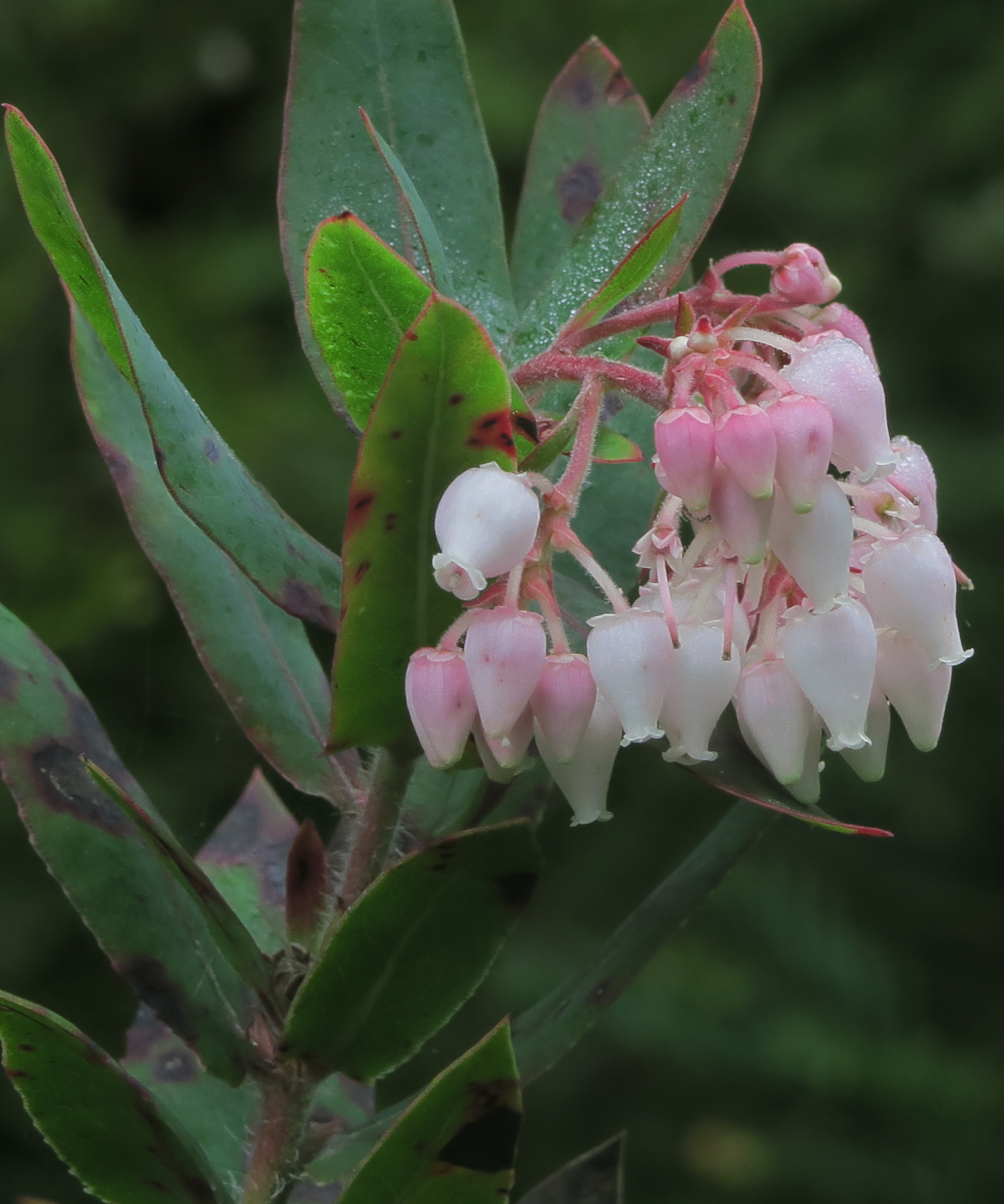
Arctostaphylos obispoensis—San Luis Obispo manzanita

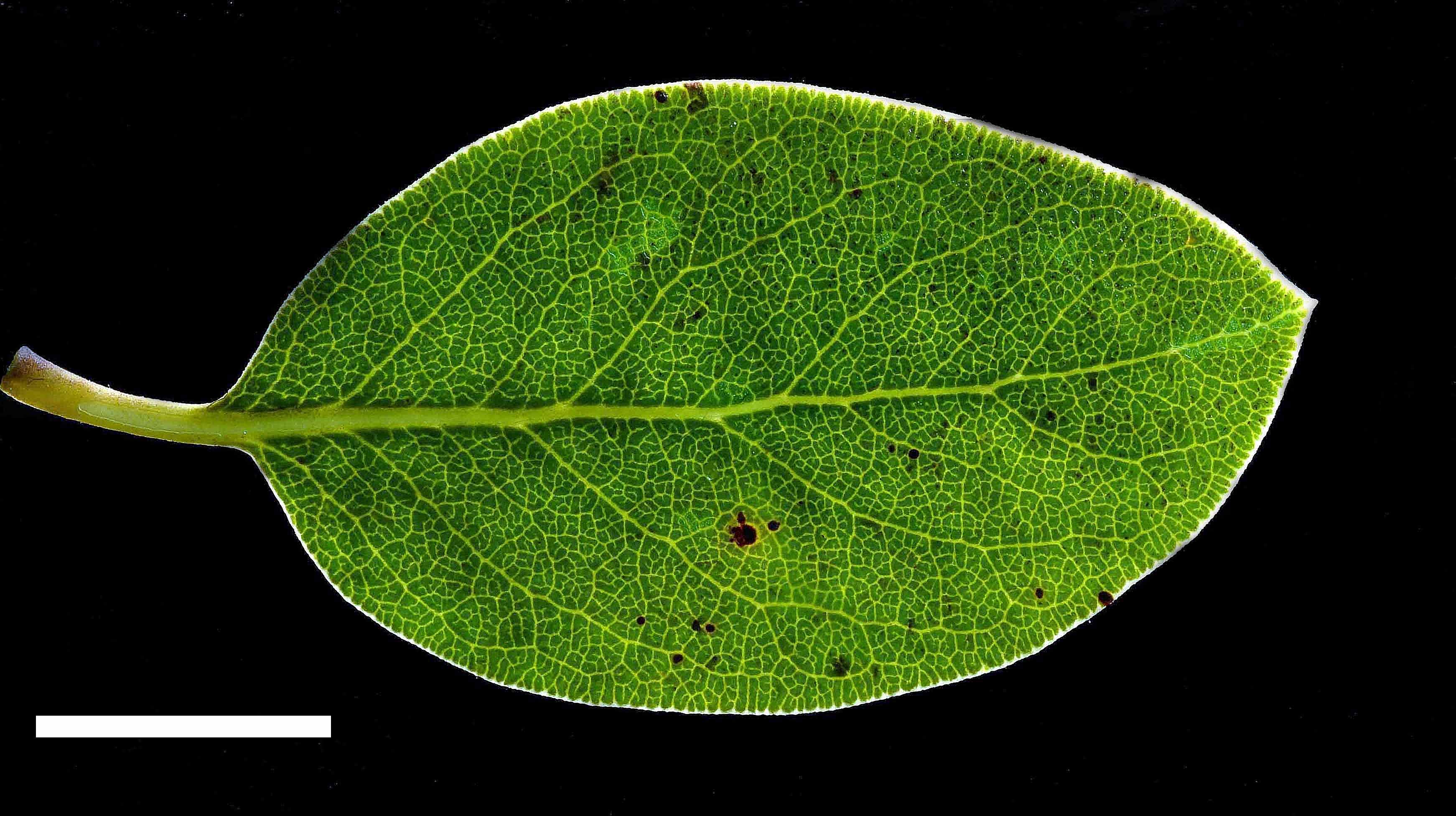
Arctostaphylos obispoensis Manzanita Mug Shot No. 66

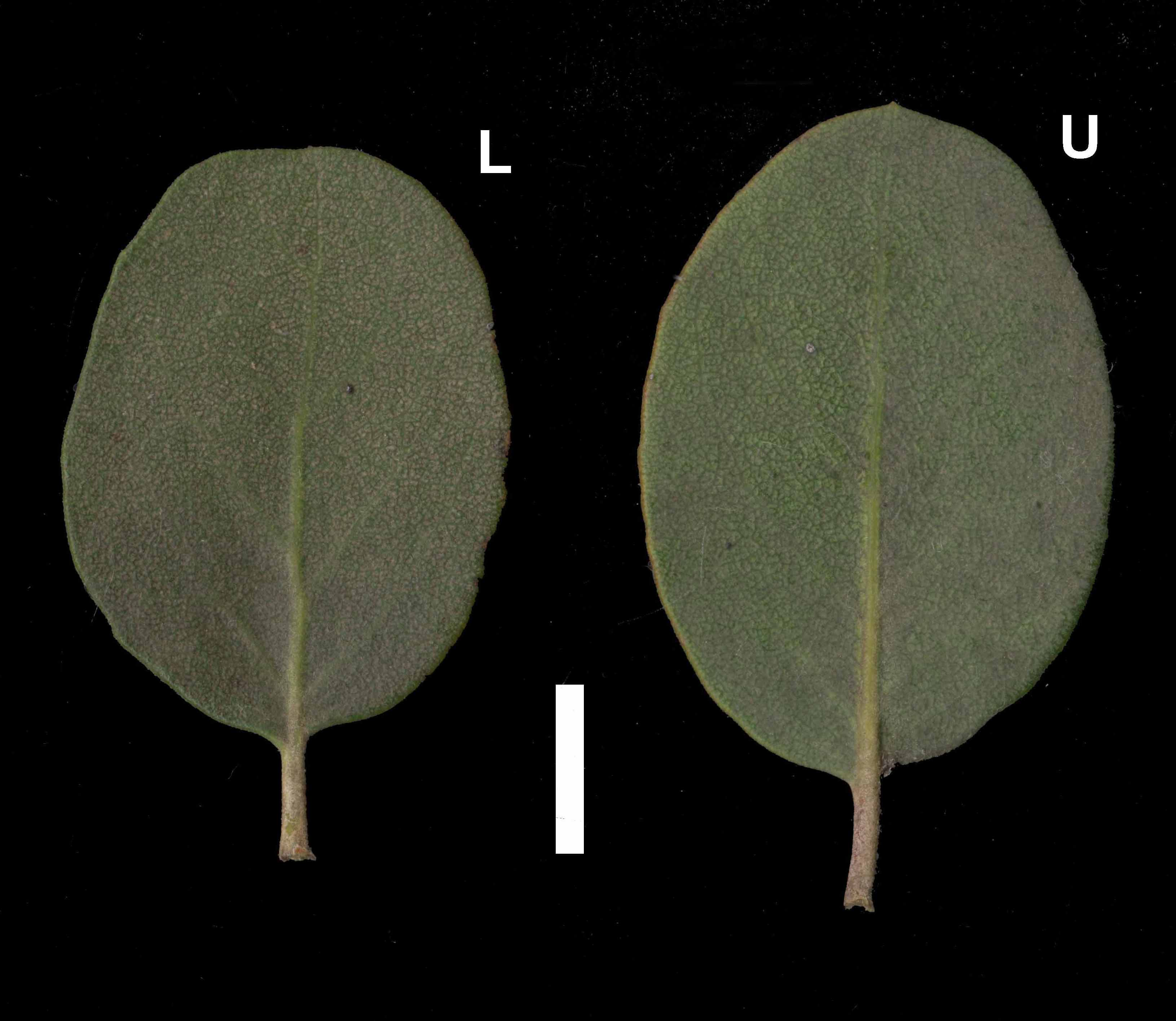
Arctostaphylos obispoensis Manzanita Mug Shot No. 66
