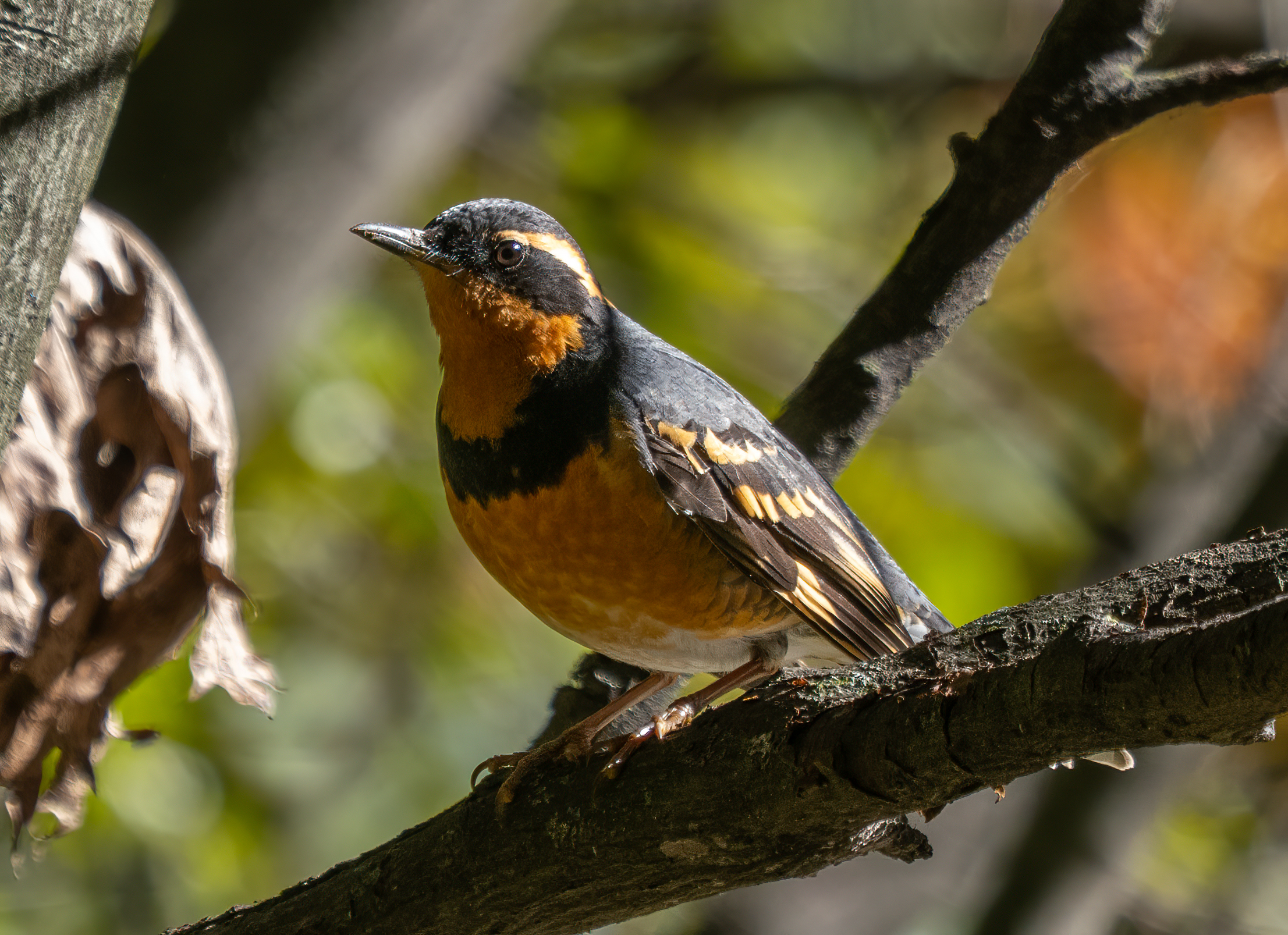
- Male

Conservation status
- Least Concern (IUCN 3.1)

Scientific classification
- Kingdom: Animalia
- Phylum: Chordata
- Class: Aves
- Order: Passeriformes
- Family: Turdidae
- Genus: Ixoreus; Bonaparte, 1854
- Species: I. naevius

Binomial name
- Ixoreus naevius (Gmelin, JF, 1789)

Subspecies
- I. n. meruloides; I. n. naevius; I. n. carlottae; I. n. godfreii
- Breeding Year-round Nonbreeding

Synonyms
- Turdus naevius; Zoothera naevia

= Varied thrush =

Species of bird

The varied thrush (Ixoreus naevius) is a member of the thrush family, Turdidae. It is the only species in the monotypic genus Ixoreus.

== Taxonomy ==
The varied thrush was formally described by the German naturalist Johann Friedrich Gmelin in 1789 under the binomial name Turdus naevius. Gmelin based his description of the "Spotted thrush" that had been described by John Latham in 1783 from specimens owned by Joseph Banks. These had been collected near Nootka Sound (formerly King George's Sound) which separates Nootka Island from Vancouver Island on the Pacific coast of Canada. The varied thrush is now the only species placed in the genus Ixoreus that was introduced by Charles Lucien Bonaparte in 1854. The genus name Ixoreus comes from the Ancient Greek ixos meaning "mistletoe". This was a synonym of a former name for the mockingbird genus, Mimus; Bonaparte assumed wrongly that, because William Swainson had shown a mockingbird and this thrush on the same plate of his book, they were related. The specific naevius is Latin for "spotted" from naevus meaning "spot".

Four subspecies are recognised:

- I. n. meruloides – (Swainson, 1832): Found in south Alaska and northwestern Canada
- I. n. naevius – (Gmelin, J.F., 1789): nominate, found in southeastern Alaska and western Canada to west central USA
- I. n. carlottae – (Phillips, A.R., 1991): found in Haida Gwaii
- I. n. godfreii – (Phillips, A.R., 1991): found in the Interior and Columbia Plateau west of the Rocky Mountains

== Description ==
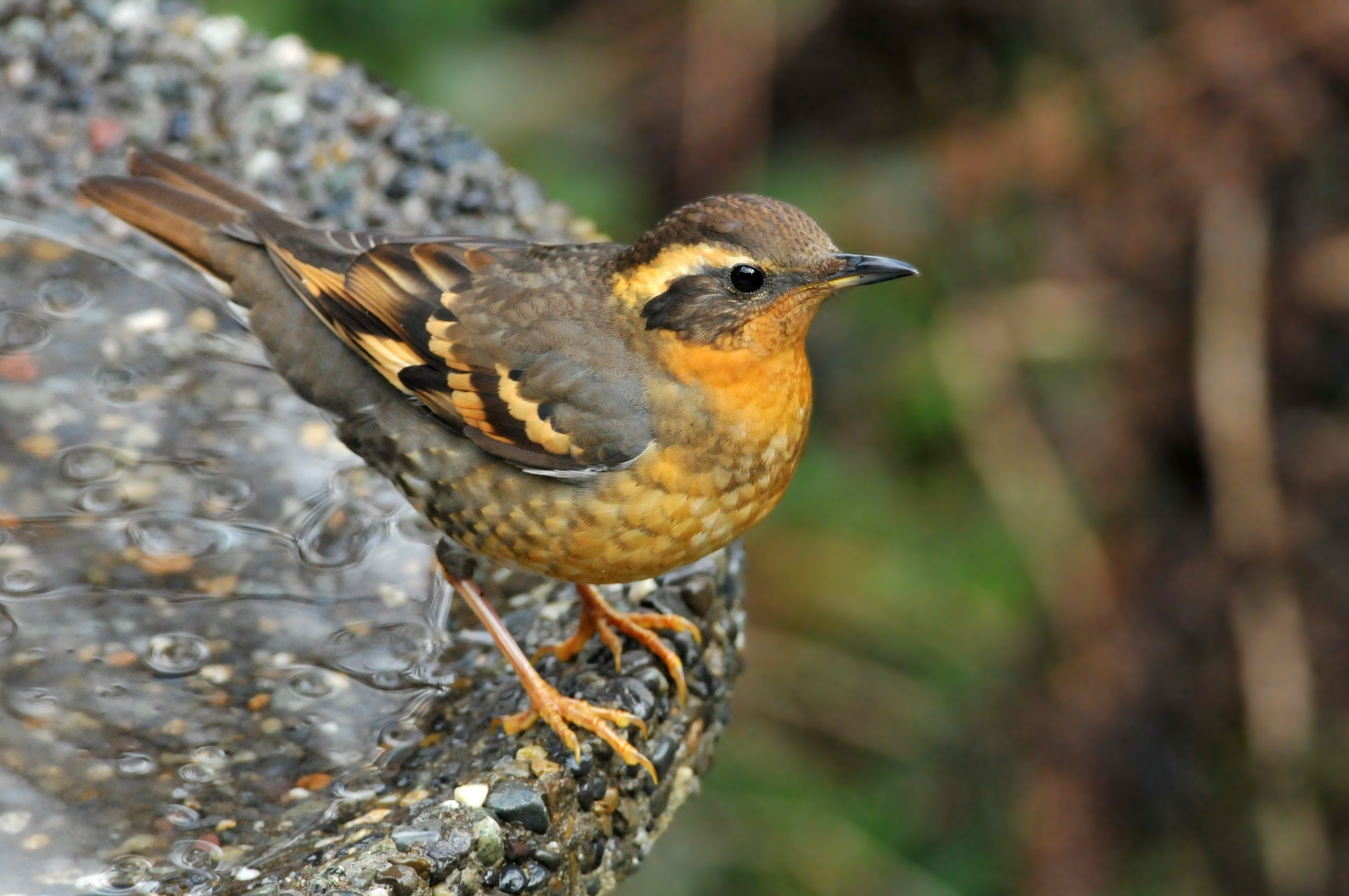
Female

The varied thrush is a fairly large thrush species. It can range from 20 to 26 cm (7.9 to 10.2 in) in length and can span 34 to 42 cm (13 to 17 in) across the wings. Body mass can vary from 65 to 100 g (2.3 to 3.5 oz). Among standard measurements, the wing chord is 11.8 to 13.6 cm (4.6 to 5.4 in), the bill is 1.8 to 2.3 cm (0.71 to 0.91 in) and the tarsus is 2.9 to 3.3 cm (1.1 to 1.3 in). It is similar in size to the widespread American robin, though the varied is on average shorter with a heavier, more robust build. In general, varied thrushes feature intense orange and black feathers. Adult males exhibit medium orange with a curved gray pattern at the breasts and throats, with grayish-blue tail ends, scruffs, and crowns. They also possess a tufted supraloral stripe and streaks of dark colors on its flight feathers. Its bill is also achromatic, but tan near the bottom of the lower jaw. Its legs are often tawny or dark brown. Females' markings are not as well-defined, with olive-browns and grays, brown hind feathers, and indiscernible gray-brown plumage near the breasts. Young varied thrushes are generally brown, though their stomach feathers are white, and initially harbor two orange stripes at the covert feathers.

Eggs are generally 3–4 per nest, but sometimes 2–5. Pale blue, lightly dotted with brown. Incubation is by female, probably about 2 weeks. Young: Both parents feed nestlings. Development of young and age at which they leave the nest are not well known. Probably 2 broods per year.

There is an extremely rare variant of this species in which all the orange in the plumage is replaced by white. A very rare British vagrant in 1982 was of this type, leading to speculation that whatever mutation causes the colour variation also affects the navigational abilities of this thrush. There have been only five recorded sightings since 1921.

== Distribution and habitat ==
The varied thrush breeds in western North America from Alaska to northern California. It is migratory, with northern breeders moving south within or somewhat beyond the breeding range. Other populations may only move altitudinally. This species is an improbable transatlantic vagrant, but there are now two accepted western European records, both in Great Britain, in 1982 and on Papa Westray in the Orkney Islands in October 2021.

Nests in Alaska, Yukon Territory, and mountains in Alberta, British Columbia, Washington, and Oregon. Prefers moist conifer forest. Most common in dense, older conifer forests in high elevations. Moves to lower elevations during the winter where it is often seen in towns and orchards and thickets, or migrates to California. Seen in flocks during winter of up to 20 birds. It is well known for individual birds to fly eastward in winter, showing up in just about any state, then returning to the west coast for breeding.

== Feeding ==
The varied thrush is predominantly insectivorous, though its diet varies throughout the course of the year. During the summer, ground-dwelling arthropods make up the bulk of its diet. During migration and winter, however, the focus of the thrush's diet shifts to fruits, seeds, and acorns, though arthropods are still taken in some quantity. Varied thrushes consume a wide variety of berries throughout the year, including snowberry, red huckleberry, California honeysuckle, madrone, salmonberry, and thimbleberry.

Varied thrushes forage primarily on the ground, except when foraging for fruits and berries.

== Breeding ==
The breeding habitat is dense coniferous forest, with two to five eggs being laid in a tree nest.

== Gallery ==
Varied thrush, Bellevue, WA, USA

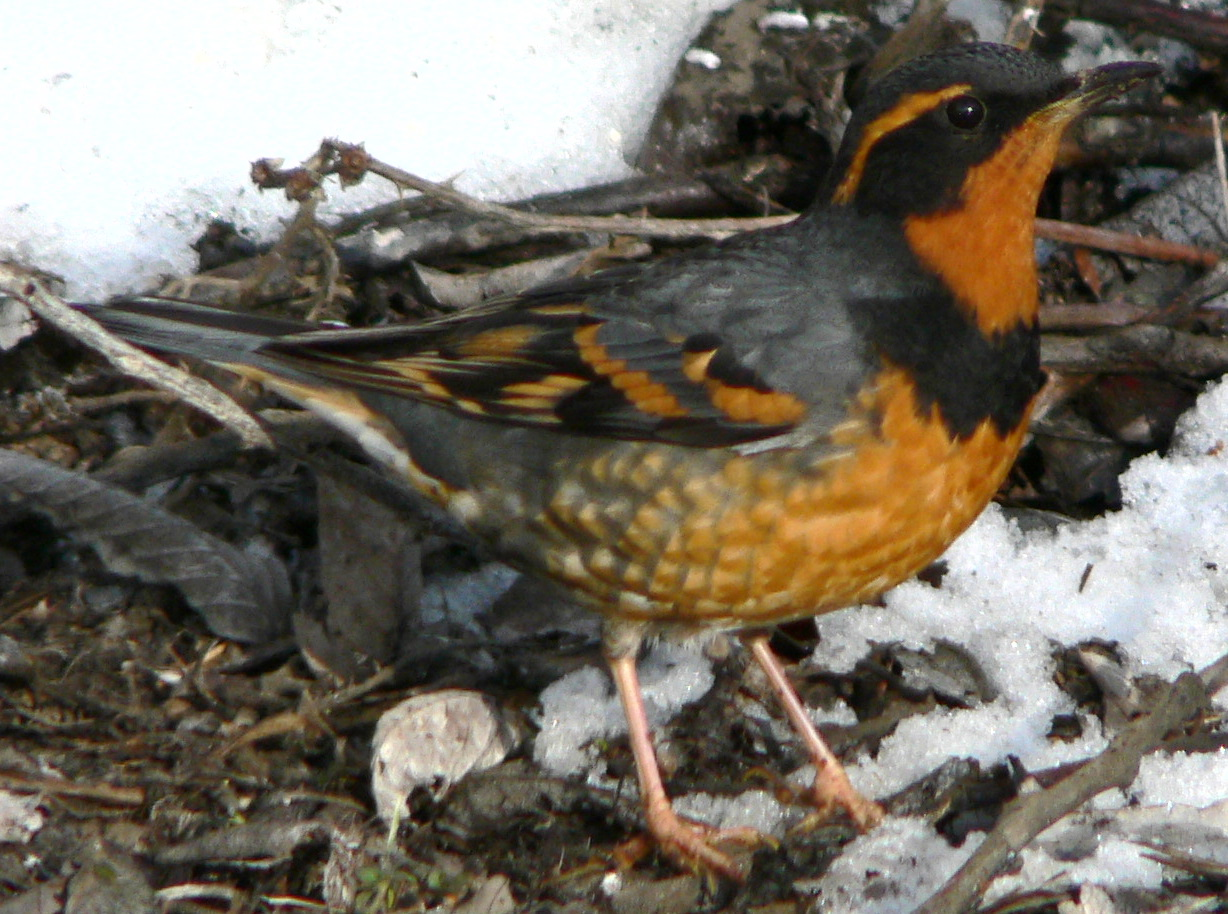
Male. Distinguishing features include a black breast band on a bright orange breast
