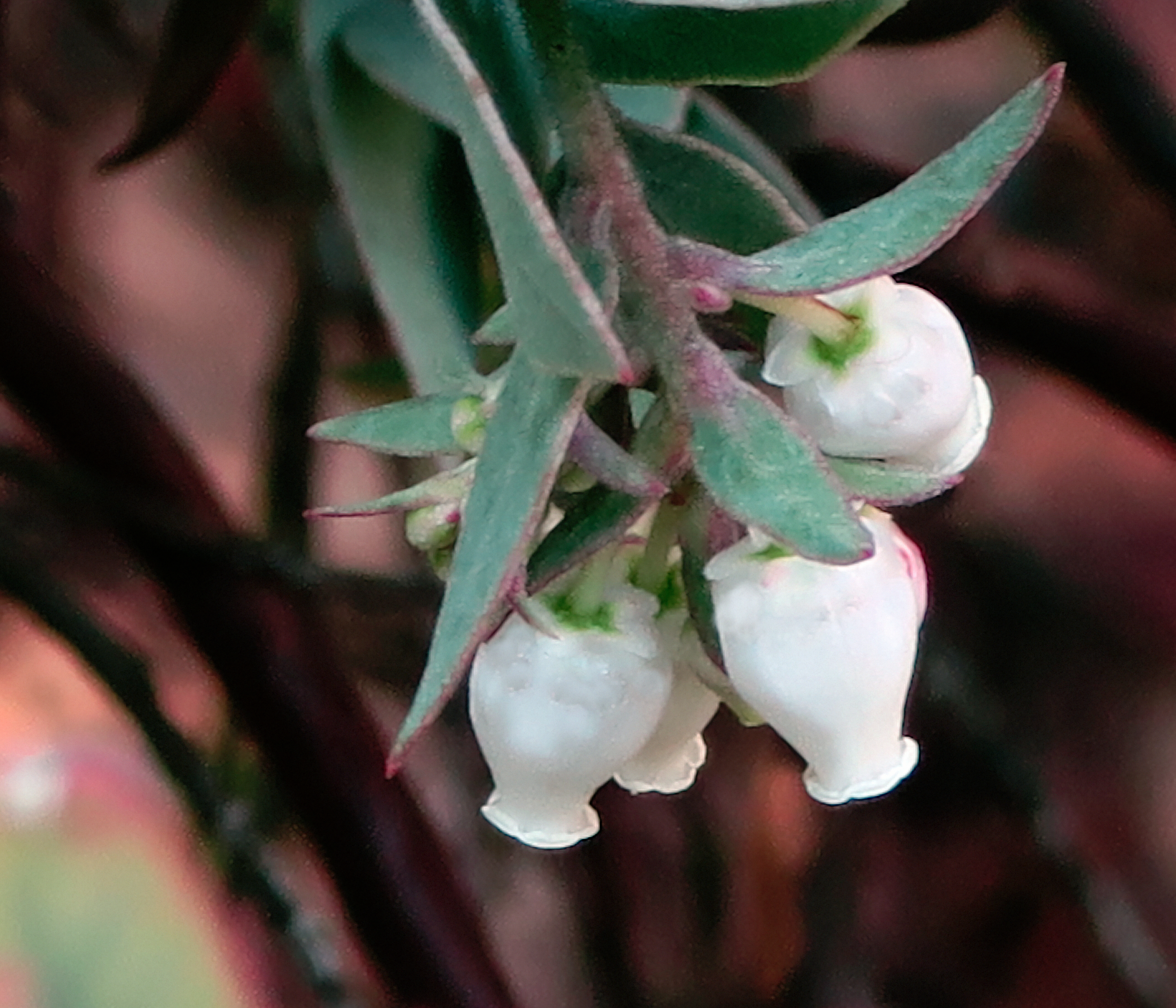

Conservation status
- Imperiled (NatureServe)

Scientific classification
- Kingdom: Plantae
- Clade: Tracheophytes
- Clade: Angiosperms
- Clade: Eudicots
- Clade: Asterids
- Order: Ericales
- Family: Ericaceae
- Genus: Arctostaphylos
- Species: A. luciana

Binomial name
- Arctostaphylos luciana P.V.Wells

= Arctostaphylos luciana =

Species of tree

Arctostaphylos luciana is a species of manzanita known by the common name Santa Lucia manzanita, is endemic to California.

== Distribution ==
The woody plant is endemic to the southern Santa Lucia Mountains, in San Luis Obispo County.

It grows in coastal sage scrub chaparral habitats, on shale outcrops and slopes, from 100–800 metres (330–2,620 ft) in elevation. It is found growing on ocean facing slopes in the upper boundary of the marine layer.

== Description ==
Arctostaphylos luciana is a shrub or small multi-trunked tree growing 2–3 metres (6.6–9.8 ft) in height.

Its leaves are glaucous−gray, waxy and woolly to smooth and hairless, with smooth edges. They are base lobed (articulate), rounded to oval in shape, 1.5–2.5 centimetres (0.59–0.98 in) wide and 2–4 centimetres (0.79–1.57 in) long.

The inflorescence is a cluster of pink and white, hairless, urn-shaped and downward facing "manzanita" flowers. The bloom period is from February to March.

The fruit is a red to green-red drupe, up to 1.2 centimetres (0.47 in) wide.

=== Conservation ===
The species is listed on the California Native Plant Society Inventory of Rare and Endangered Plants as a fairly endangered and vulnerable species. Some populations are protected within the southern Cuesta Ridge Botanical Special Interest Area of the Los Padres National Forest.

== See also ==
- Arctostaphylos obispoensis — range adjacent atop Cuesta Ridge
- Arctostaphylos pilosula — range nearby on east side of Cuesta Ridge
- Natural history of the California chaparral and woodlands
