= Trifolium barbigerum =

Scientific classification
- Kingdom: Plantae
- Clade: Embryophytes
- Clade: Tracheophytes
- Clade: Spermatophytes
- Clade: Angiosperms
- Clade: Eudicots
- Clade: Rosids
- Order: Fabales
- Family: Fabaceae
- Subfamily: Faboideae
- Genus: Trifolium
- Species: T. barbigerum

Binomial name
- Trifolium barbigerum Torr.

Species of flowering plant

Trifolium barbigerum is a species of clover known by the common name bearded clover.

== Description ==
Trifolium barbigerum is an annual herb growing decumbent to erect in form and hairy to hairless in texture. The leaves are divided into oval leaflets up to 2.5 centimeters (1 in) long, sometimes having notches at the tips. The stipules on the leaves are large and variable in shape.

The inflorescence is a head of flowers up to 2.5 cm wide. The flowers are held in a bowl-shaped involucre of bracts with toothed edges. Each flower has a calyx of sepals narrowing into one or more bristles which are coated with long hairs. Within each calyx is the flower corolla which may be pinkish purple, white, or bicolored purple and white.

The bloom period is April to July.

=== Varieties ===
Trifolium barbigerum was formerly discussed classified with two varieties, that are not in current use:

- Trifolium barbigerum var. andrewsii – reclassified as Trifolium grayi
- Trifolium. barbigerum var. barbigerum – reclassified as a synonym of Trifolium barbigerum

== Distribution and habitat ==
The plant is native to central coastal and Northern California and Oregon, below 700 meters (2,300 ft) in elevation. Areas it is found include on the northern Channel Islands of California, the California Coast Ranges, and around the San Francisco Bay Area.

It grows in many types of habitat, including coastal prairie, mixed evergreen forest, closed-cone pine forest, and wetland−riparian areas. It is also found in disturbed and cultivated areas.
