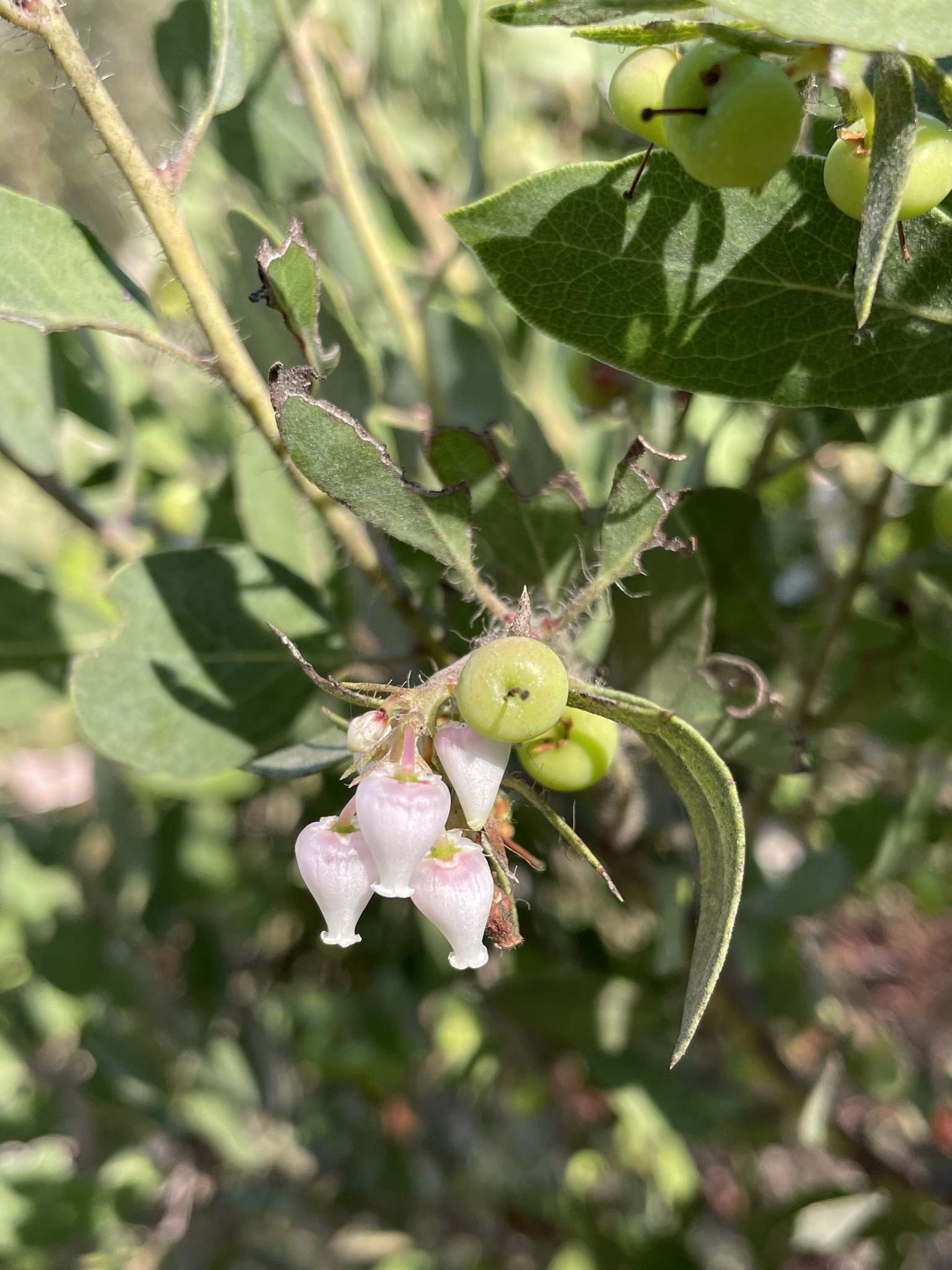

Conservation status
- Imperiled (NatureServe)

Scientific classification
- Kingdom: Plantae
- Clade: Tracheophytes
- Clade: Angiosperms
- Clade: Eudicots
- Clade: Asterids
- Order: Ericales
- Family: Ericaceae
- Genus: Arctostaphylos
- Species: A. pilosula

Binomial name
- Arctostaphylos pilosula Jeps. & Wies. ex Jeps.

= Arctostaphylos pilosula =

Species of flowering plant

Arctostaphylos pilosula is a species of manzanita, known by the common names La Panza manzanita and Santa Margarita manzanita, that is endemic to California.

Its common names comes from populations on the La Panza Range, near the town of Santa Margarita.

== Distribution ==
The plant is endemic San Luis Obispo County, found in three areas: the La Panza Range, the east slope of the Santa Lucia Mountains near Atascadero, and in the San Luis Range near Pismo Beach.

It grows in chaparral and closed-cone pine forest habitats, on shale and sandstone outcrops and slopes. It is found at elevations of 30–1,250 metres (98–4,101 ft).

== Description ==
Arctostaphylos pilosula is an erect and bristly shrub growing 1–5 metres (3.3–16.4 ft) in height.

The leaves are a round, oval shape and dull and hairless in texture. They grow up to 3 centimetres (1.2 in) long.

The shrub blooms in spherical white inflorescences of cone-shaped and downward facing "manzanita" flowers, each just under 1 centimetre (0.39 in) long. Its bloom period is December to March.

The fruit is a reddish-brown drupe about a centimeter wide, that ripen in the summer.

=== Conservation ===
The species is listed on the California Native Plant Society Inventory of Rare and Endangered Plants as a fairly endangered and vulnerable species.
