= Closed-cone conifer forest =

Plant community

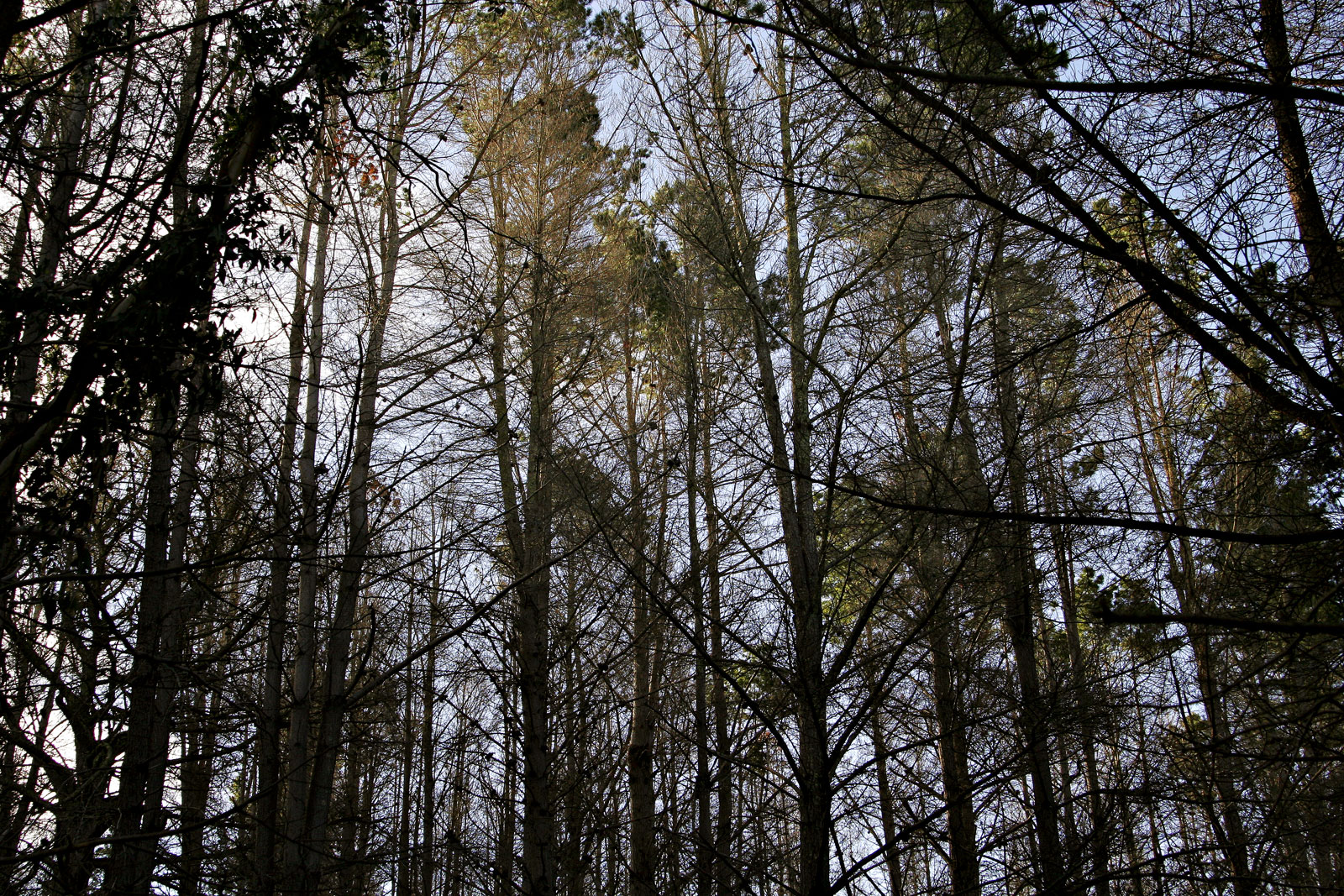
A forest of Monterey pines

A closed-cone conifer forest or woodland is a plant community occurring in coastal California and several offshore islands. The forests typically have a single-aged single-species conifer overstory with dense ladder fuels. Overstory species include coulter pine, Monterey pine, bishop pine, shore pine, and several endemic cypresses, pyriscencent species which generally rely on fire to open their cones and release seeds. Closed-cone forests often grow in low nutrient and/or stressed soils, which can lead to slow growth.

== Closed-cone conifers ==
The most widespread naturally of the closed-cone pines is bishop pine (Pinus muricata), which can be found along the coast from Humboldt County, California in the north to the northwestern corner of Baja California in the south. Knobcone pine (Pinus attenuata) forests can occur further inland, on dry, rocky soils. Monterey pine (Pinus radiata) was once limited to the Monterey Peninsula, two other sites in central California, and Guadalupe and Cedros Islands off the coast of Baja California, but has now been introduced elsewhere in California and around the world. Most of these trees have an average life-span of around 50–90 years

== Climate ==
The weather of these forests is quite mild in both winter and summer. Temperatures rarely go below freezing or grow uncomfortably warm. Closed-cone pine forests of California are located in cool-summer Mediterranean climate regions along the coast with cool wet winters and hot, dry summers. Despite the fact that the summers are dry, the air is consistently humid due to frequent coastal fog brought in by interior heat. The fog also supplies irrigation when it passes through the conifer needles of the pines. The moisture is caught this way and drips to the forest floor. Thus, drought is avoided by up to 40%. In the autumn, fog is less frequent and it is during this season when occasional heat waves are possible. This is when fires are most likely. Precipitation ranges from 20 to 60 inches a year, depending on the locale.

== Ecology ==
The conifers are serotinous, releasing seeds in response to an environmental trigger, such as fire or shoot death. One family commonly having serotiny due to shoot death is Cupressaceae, while the genus Pinus generally has serotonin to fire/heat. Sargent cypress, Gowan cypress, McNabb cypress, Monterrey Pine, Torrey Pine, bishop pine, coulter pine, knob-cone pine, and lodgepole pine are all California endemic serotinous conifer species.

Closed-cone forests rely on regular but infrequent fires, often stand-replacing crown fires. Fire opens up space in the canopy or clears away litter on the ground, so there is less competition for germinating seeds. Thus, the fire is an advantageous time for trees to drop their seeds.

== Other flora and fauna ==
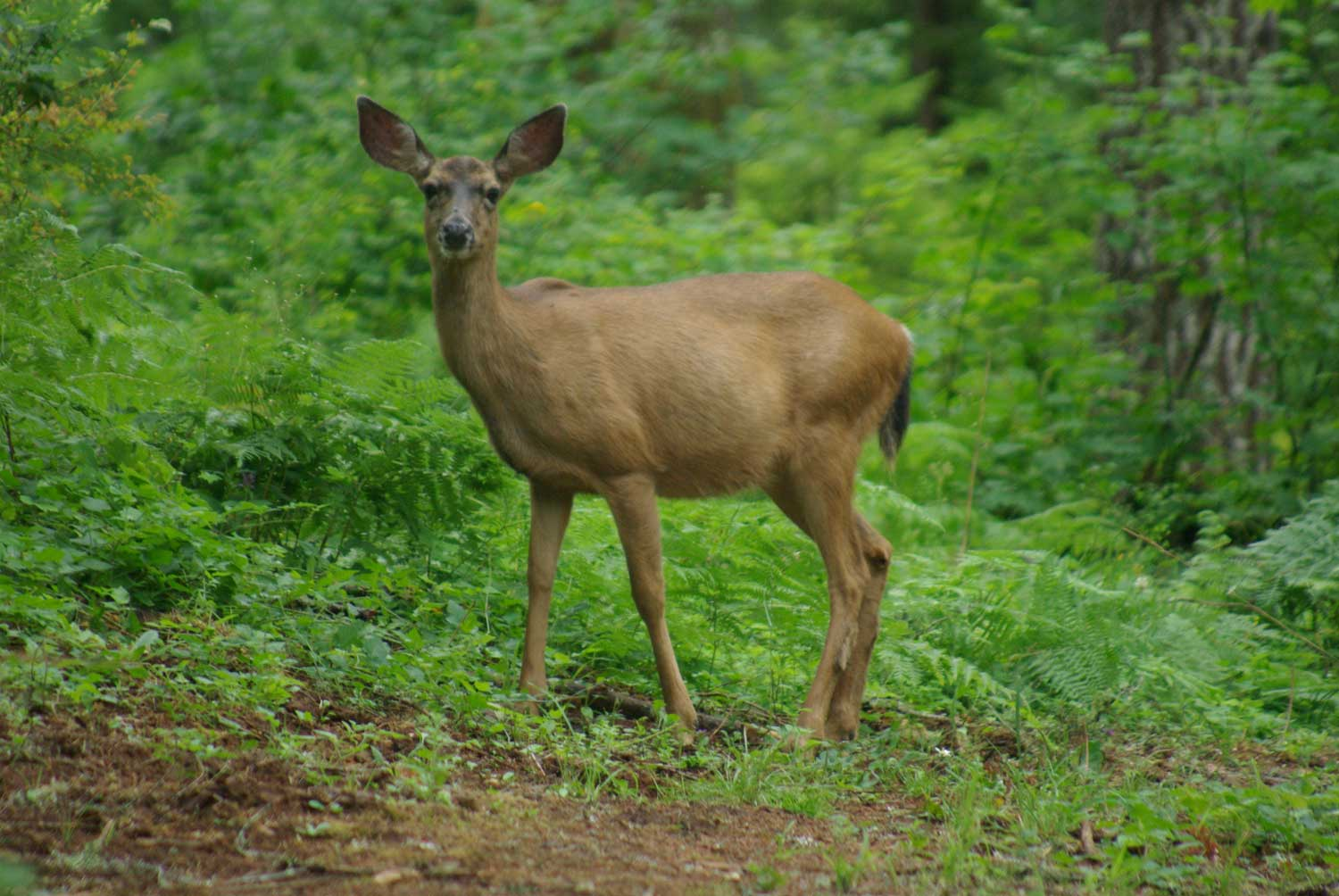
Black-tailed deer

While the pines or cypresses are by far, the most common tree in these forests, coast live oaks often accompany them. Due to the relatively short lifespan of closed-cone pines, many dead trunks and snags are available and attract a whole host of wildlife ranging from woodpeckers, titmice, chickadees, warblers, squirrels, chipmunks, raccoons, mountain lions, deer and many others. The lush undergrowth, typical of the forests, are excellent habitat as well. Blackberries, wild roses, wood mints, California honeysuckle, currants, and others are common. The flora and fauna varies from area to areas, especially the southern and northern closed-cone pine regions. Soils have low nutrients and are stressed due to a lack of nitrogen. This promotes slow growth.

Lichens and mosses in these forests are diverse and can be abundant.

== See also ==
- Fire ecology
- Conifer forest
- California montane chaparral and woodlands (subecoregion)
- California interior chaparral and woodlands (subecoregion)
