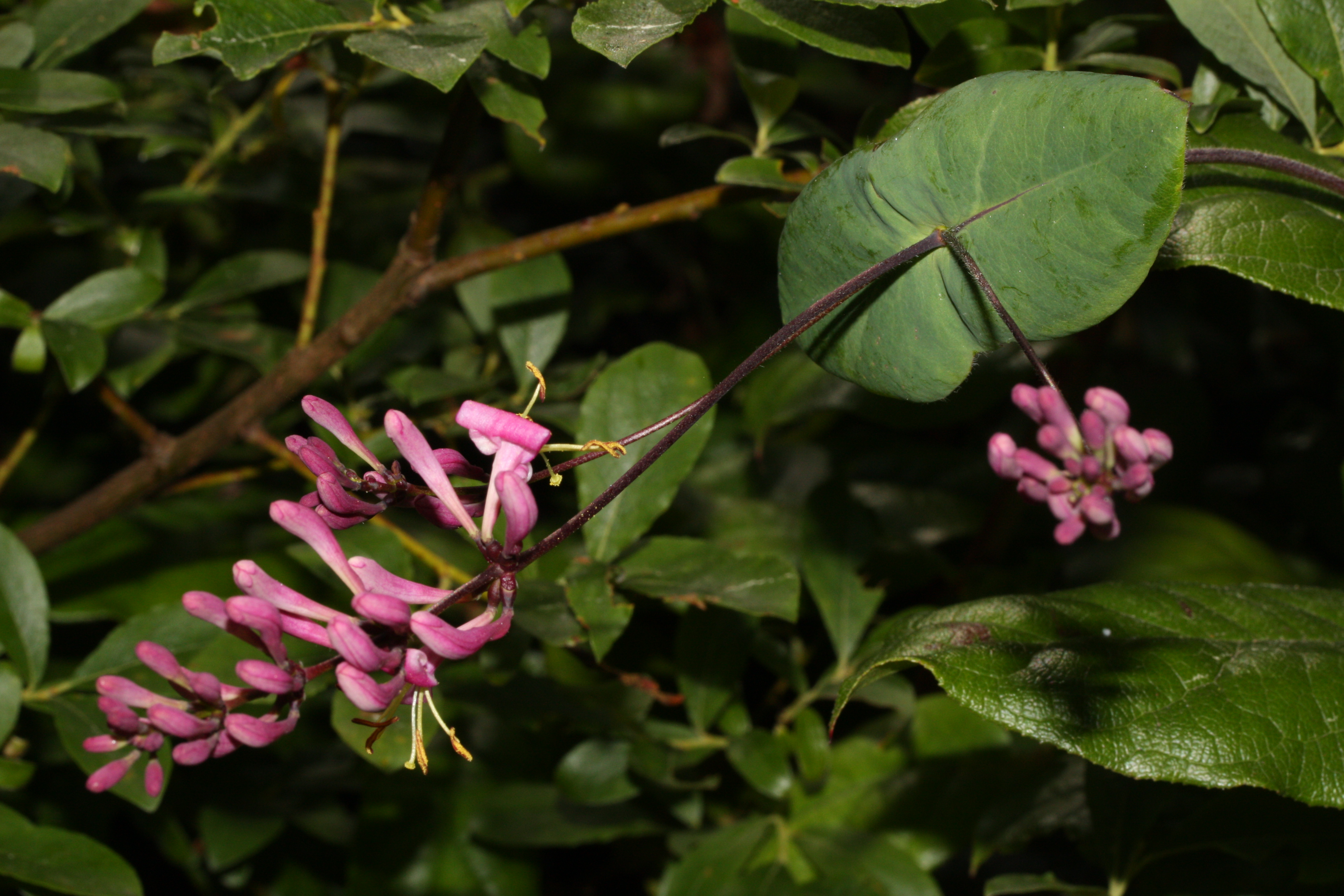
- Lonicera hispidula in Anacortes, Washington

Scientific classification
- Kingdom: Plantae
- Clade: Tracheophytes
- Clade: Angiosperms
- Clade: Eudicots
- Clade: Asterids
- Order: Dipsacales
- Family: Caprifoliaceae
- Genus: Lonicera
- Species: L. hispidula

Binomial name
- Lonicera hispidula (Lindl.) Dougl. ex Torr. & Gray

Synonyms
- Lonicera anisocalyx Rehder; Lonicera chaetocarpa (Batalin ex Rehder) Rehder; Lonicera finitima W.W. Sm.; Lonicera montigena Rehder

= Lonicera hispidula =

Species of honeysuckle

The perennial vine Lonicera hispidula is a species of honeysuckle known as pink honeysuckle and, less often, California honeysuckle. It is a low-elevation woodlands shrub or vine domestically grown, specifically found on the West Coast of North America.

== Description ==
Like other honeysuckles, Lonicera hispidula has pairs of leaves that grow opposite each other on the stem, with the uppermost pair fused at the bases to surround the stem. When the branches cling to another plant or surface, the branches elongate outwards while the center of the plants shifts into a bushier, more structured shrub. At the end of the stem grow pink blossoms. It is a perennial shrub or vine.

Lonicera hispidula has an opposite leaf arrangement with a simple leaf complexity. The flower has an entire leaf margin, meaning it has a smooth edge with no serrations. The honeysuckle flowers are tubular and slightly curved, but is described to have an ovate shape when discussing the whole flower including the petals.

The flower species has a unisexual breeding system, where the male and female reproductive organs are split between two flowers. The plant has dioecious flowers, illustrating that there are male or female individual plants present which is less common. The inflorescence is expressed as a spike, meaning that the flowers are arranged on a long and thin axis with the flowers vertically lined up without the presence of branches. The flowers continue to bloom from the base to the tip when the spike is stretched out.

== Taxonomy ==
Currently no subspecies are recognized. Previously recognized subspecies include Lonicera hispidula var. californica (Torr. & A. Gray) Rehder, Lonicera hispidula var. hispidula, and Lonicera hispidula var. vacillans A. Gray.

== Ecology ==
Lonicera hispidula grows in riparian and woodland areas. It commonly grows in coastal riparian sections and mountains in California, but have been seen in the west near the Cascades in Washington and Oregon. The plant is commonly discovered near canyons, streams, and woodlands with an elevation ranging from 1,500 to 3,500 feet. The honeysuckle produces berries, with fruit that has a fleshy outer appearance with seeds contained inside. Generally, the berry has a red color when it's at peak maturity and is small with a size of 8 mm. The flowers attract hummingbirds, while other birds eat the fruits.

Lonicera hispidula normally blooms during spring specifically in the months of May and June, depending on the environmental surroundings. Although the flowers are usually pink, they also exhibit other adaptations consisting of white, dark red rose or purple & a light yellow. The plant commonly attracts various organisms including butterflies, bees, and hummingbirds.

The plant can be grown in protective sun and shade, but thrives the most in acidic, dry to moist soils.

== Toxicity ==
According to the Lady Bird Johnson Wildflower Center, "Berries may be mildly poisonous if eaten. Sensitivity to a toxin varies with a person's age, weight, physical condition, and individual susceptibility. Children are most vulnerable because of their curiosity and small size."

== Uses ==
The stems are hollow and sturdy and were used by the Pomo people as smoking pipes. The burned woods ashes were also used for tattooing. It is cultivated by specialty native plant plant nurseries as an ornamental plant for drought-tolerant wildlife gardens and natural landscaping in California. The plant is seemingly pest and disease free and is labeled as a low maintenance plant that can thrive with minimal care which is optimal for a wildlife garden. The pink honeysuckle has shown scenarios proving that the plant is a host for the "sudden oak death" pathogen, causing a deadly canker disease for various oak trees originated in California and Oregon.
