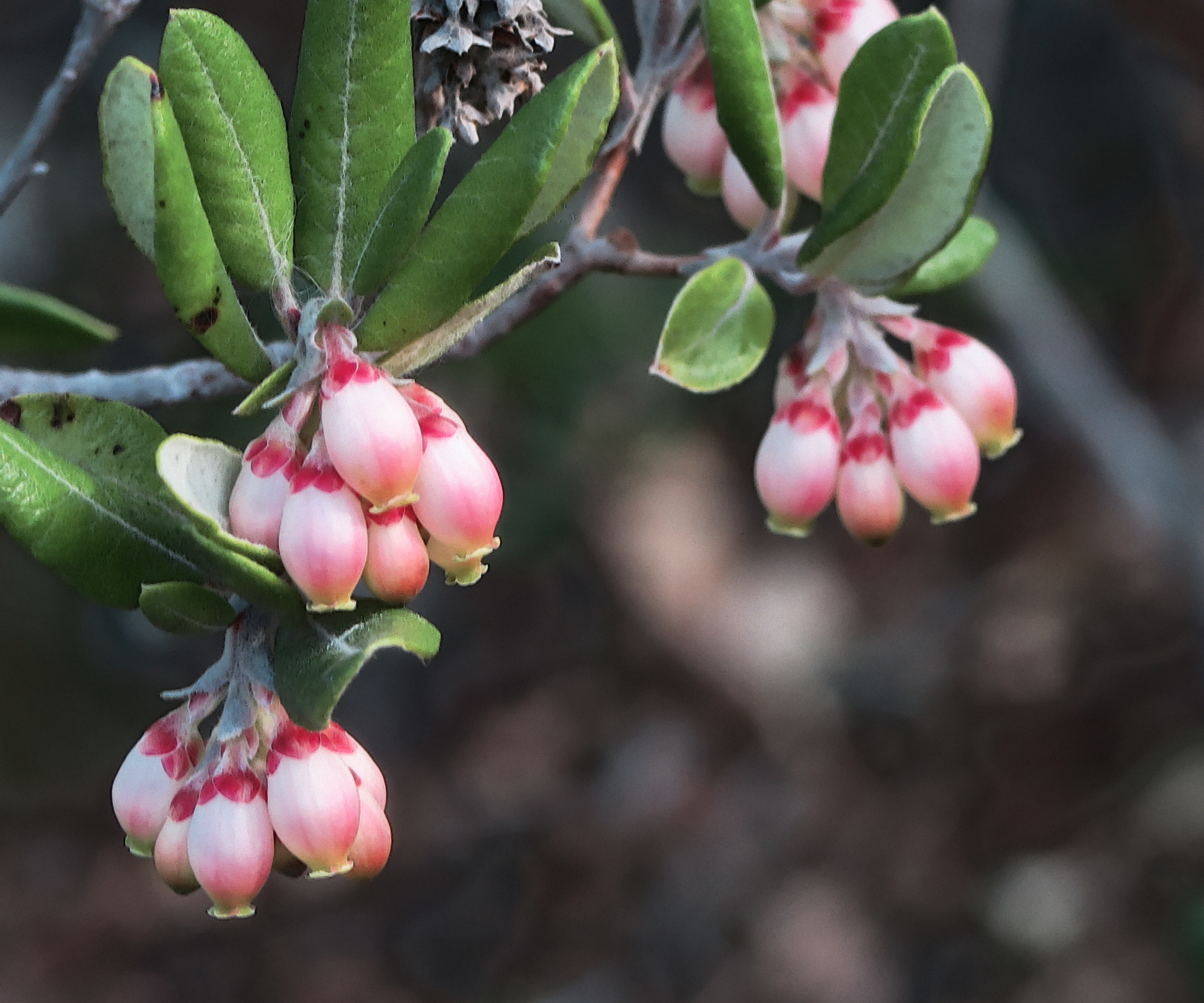
- Xylococcus bicolor in bloom

Scientific classification
- Kingdom: Plantae
- Clade: Tracheophytes
- Clade: Angiosperms
- Clade: Eudicots
- Clade: Asterids
- Order: Ericales
- Family: Ericaceae
- Subfamily: Arbutoideae
- Genus: Xylococcus; Nutt.
- Species: X. bicolor

Binomial name
- Xylococcus bicolor Nutt.

Synonyms
- Arctostaphylos bicolor (Nutt.) A.Gray; Arctostaphylos clevelandii A.Gray; Arctostaphylos veatchii Kellogg; Comarostaphylis bicolor (Nutt.) Klotzsch

= Xylococcus bicolor =

Tree or shrub from North America

Xylococcus is a monotypic genus of flowering plants in the heather family which contains the single species Xylococcus bicolor, commonly known as the mission manzanita. It is a burl-forming, evergreen shrub with leathery leaves and smooth dark reddish bark. From December to February, white to pink urn-shaped flowers adorn the foliage, often attracting hummingbird pollinators. It is native to southern California and the Baja California Peninsula, south to the Sierra de la Giganta. There is growing concern over the future of this plant, referred to as the "queen of the elfin forest", as it may possibly lose up to 88% of its habitat and its wild seedlings are failing to survive more than a full year.

Known to and utilized by the indigenous peoples for centuries, this species was first described to Western science by Thomas Nuttall, who had found it on his journey to California. Nuttall named it Xylococcus, which is derived from the Greek word for "wood berry". Later botanists lumped this species into the true manzanitas (Arctostaphylos), but it has distinct features, such as the flowers and fruit, that support its generic placement. In light of its struggle in the wild, this plant is available from specialty nurseries focusing on California native plants, making it a distinctive and hardy shrub in the garden.

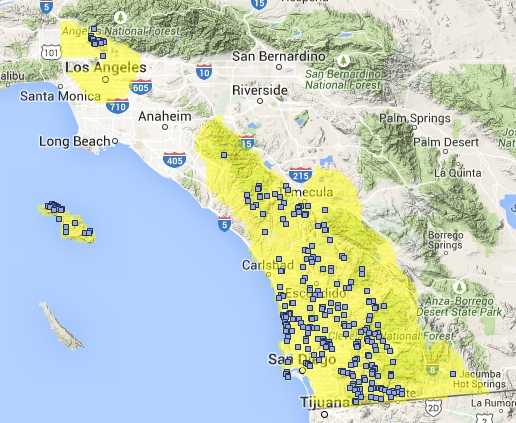
Natural distribution of Xylococcus bicolor in California.

== Description ==
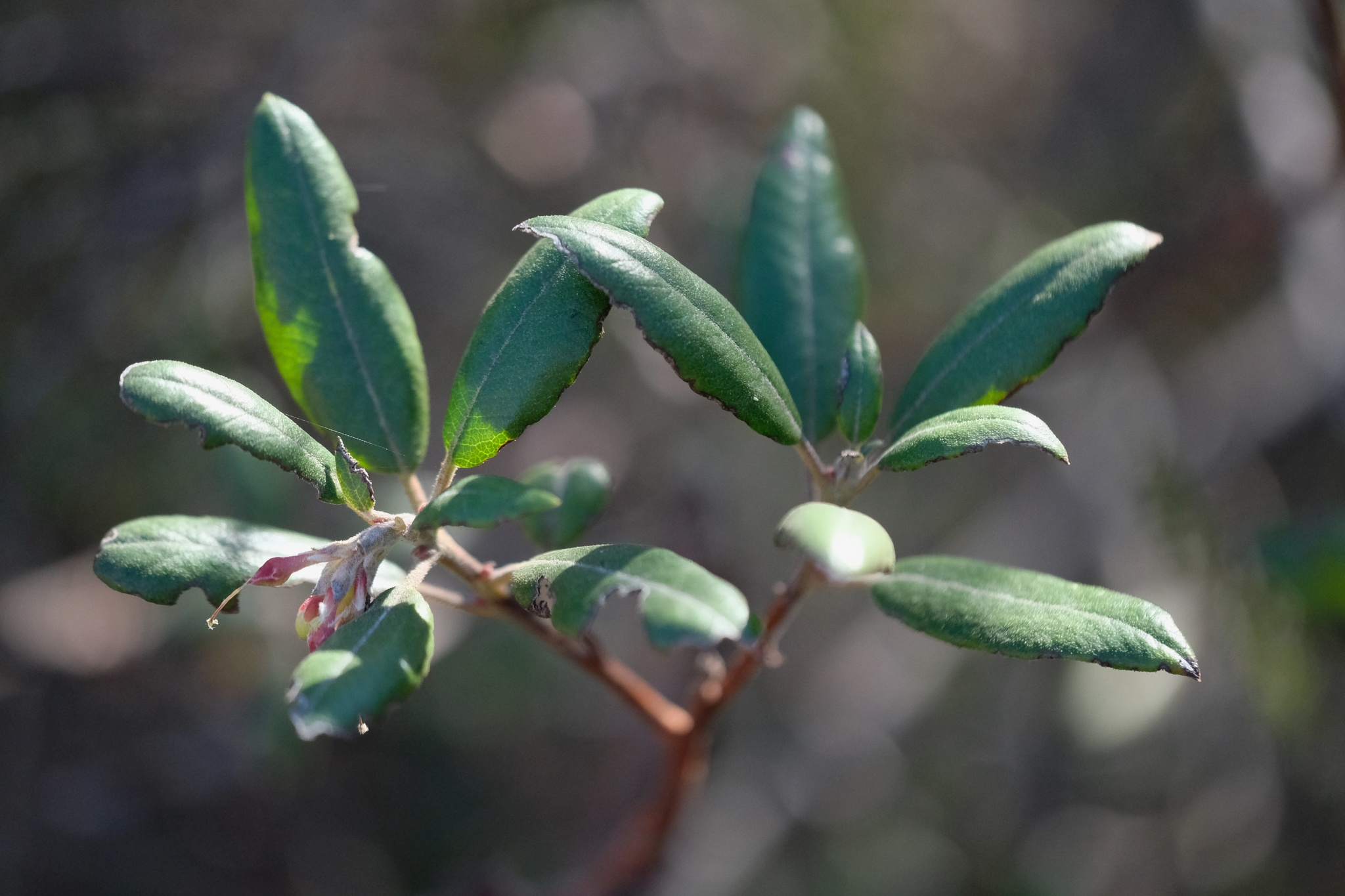
The leaves

Starting from the ground up, one will notice this evergreen shrub or tree has a burl, or lignotuber, an underground storage organ, which is topped by a smooth trunk with peeling red bark. The smooth red trunk is characteristic of other Arbutoideae in the region, like Arctostaphylos species, although this species has a darker tint to its bark. This species may rarely grow up to 6 metres (20 ft) in height. The stems are erect, generally less than 2.5 m (8.2 ft) in length, with canescent twigs. On the twigs are the alternately-arranged, leathery leaves, which have a lower surface that is densely covered with white to gray hairs. The margin of the leaves lack teeth and are rolled under. The leaves are up to 4.5 cm long.

The dense inflorescence is a panicle, which hangs downward and is bracted. The pedicel is not jointed to the flower, with 2 bractlets. There are 5 sepals on the flower, along with 5 petals, which are fused to form an urn-shaped corolla. The white to pink corolla is covered in hairs. Within the flower, there are 10 stamens, with the filaments wooly in their lower half. The ovary is superior (attached to the receptacle above the attachment of other floral parts) and is hairy, with generally 5 chambers. Upon maturity, the flowers turn into a fruit around 9 mm (0.35 in) wide. The fruit is a dark-brown drupe, with 5 stones that are fused into a smooth unit.

== Taxonomy ==
This species was first collected and identified by Thomas Nuttall, an English botanist and naturalist. Previously reaching the west coast on a journey with Nathaniel Jarvis Wyeth and then proceeding to Hawaii, Nuttall had arrived in San Diego aboard the hide ship Pilgrim, staying in the harbor for three weeks as he waited for a Bryant and Sturgis ship to sail him back to Boston. Nuttall was one of few naturalists to step foot in the region at the time, being preceded by Menzies, Botta, Coulter, and Deppe, all of whom had only stopped in San Diego briefly. During Nuttall's stay in San Diego, he collected around 44 species of plants, including this species.

=== Etymology ===
The name Xylococcus derives from the Greek word for "wood berry", which refers to the rock-hard stone the seeds are encased within. The specific epithet, bicolor, refers to the leaves, which are a dark green on the top surface and a wooly-white on the bottom.

== Distribution and habitat ==
The plant's native range is very limited, to the Peninsular Ranges in Southern California (U.S.) and the Baja California Peninsula (México), the South Coast of California and Santa Catalina Island, and the northwestern Baja California coast and Cedros Island. Its populations are primarily in San Diego County, California and Baja California state.

It is a member of the chaparral plant community, in the California chaparral and woodlands and California coastal sage and chaparral ecoregions. It grows at elevations below 3,500 feet (1,100 m), on dry, sunny slopes. In Baja California, the species also occurs outside of the chaparral plant community, particularly in sky islands of the central desert, and in the xeric scrub community of the Sierra de la Giganta mountain ranges in Baja California Sur.

== Ecology ==
Birds, including the California thrasher and California scrub jay, eat its seeds. Hummingbirds, especially the resident Anna's hummingbird, drink nectar from its flowers. Various birds nest in the plant, and many use it for cover.

While some chaparral plant species require fire to germinate seeds and reproduce, Xylococcus bicolor does not, nor does it require openings left by wildfires. As a chaparral member species it must have a means of coping with wildfire, and it does so by resprouting from the base after its top has burned away. This mechanism works very well, unless a second fire follows closely after the first. If a plant has not had time to sufficiently regenerate, it will probably perish.

=== Reproductive crisis ===
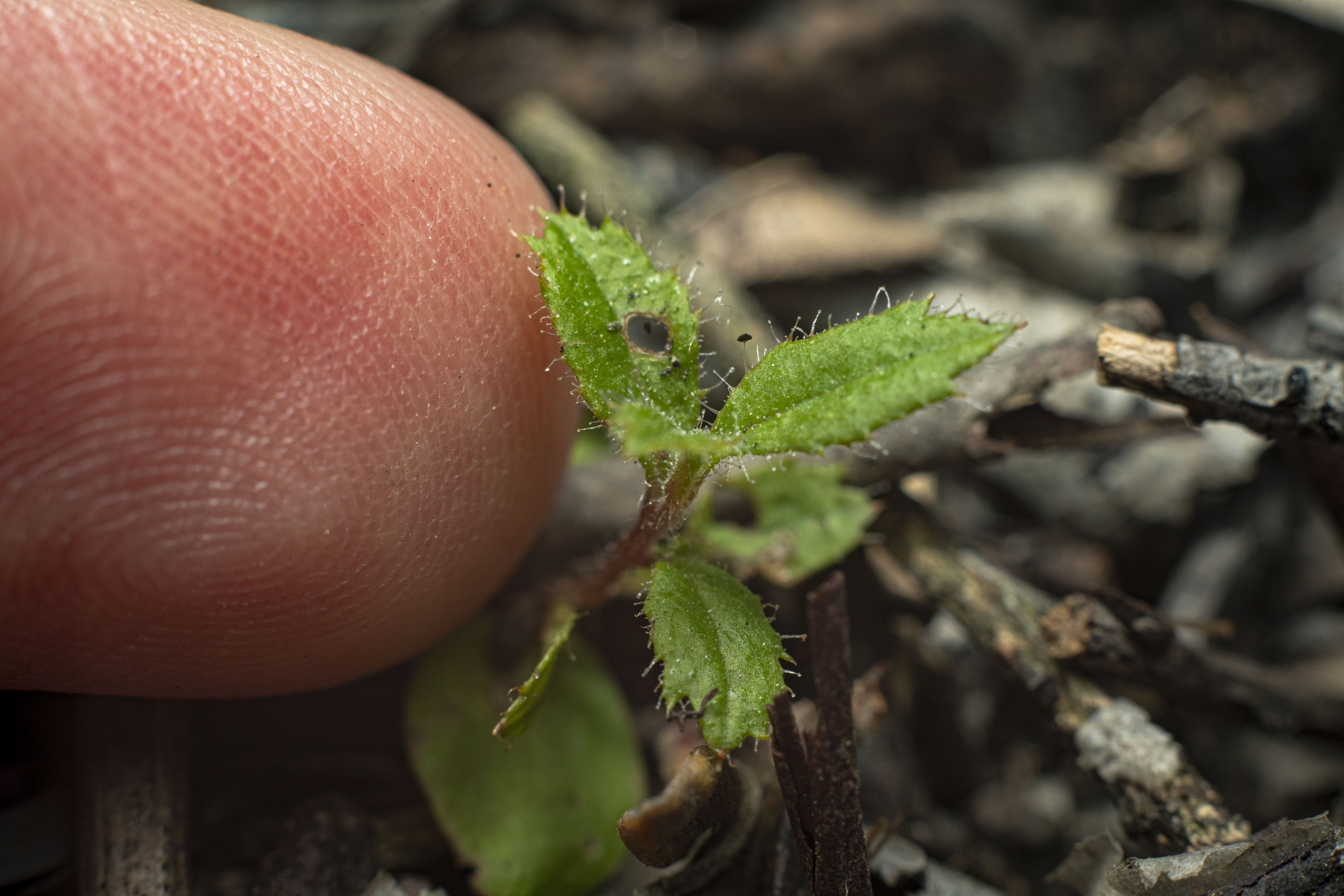
A seedling of Xylococcus bicolor. Note the cotyledons at the base.

There is growing concern that this species is unable to produce young individuals in the wild. Despite producing thousands of drupes annually, many intensive searches had failed to find seedlings, and it was believed that the species could no longer reproduce by seeds. Complicating this predicament, the seeds of Xylococcus are still perfectly viable, with 61% of stones having at least one seed filled with live endosperm. One hypothesis put forward was that the seeds needed to pass through the digestive system of the now-extinct California grizzly bear to germinate, or that the stones containing the seeds need to be broken by the bear's strong jaws.

Some experts, like Paul Zedler at the University of Wisconsin-Madison, contend that Xylococcus reproduction might simply encompass a larger timeframe than human observers might expect, similar to the long reproductive cycles in species like the giant sequoia. The giant sequoia annually produces 300,000 to 400,000 seeds, with many seedlings emerging from the duff on the forest floor, but only very few of these seedlings thrive unless conditions are correct. This means that despite the massive seed production, the giant sequoia seldom has young plants that can maintain the density of old groves. Some specimens of Xylococcus can live up to a century or more, and like the giant sequoia, produce thousands of their seeds annually through their drupes, meaning that perhaps their reproduction occurs on a longer ecological time scale.

In 2008, a bioblitz in San Diego led to the discovery of 53 seedlings and possible saplings growing in Florida Canyon, Balboa Park. It was discovered that the following February, none of the 2008 seedlings had survived, although new ones had emerged, meaning that none of the seedlings could survive a full year. Many other seedlings have been found successfully growing, but they are difficult to monitor, and often in the path of development. Very few seedlings have been documented to survive more than year, although one 30-year old seedling has been found.

== Uses ==
The Native American Luiseño people bruised ripe berries and soaked them overnight in cold water to produce a cider-like drink. Delfina Cuero, a member of the Kumeyaay people, corroborates a similar use of Xylococcus (known to her people as Haasill), soaking the ripe berries to use as a cool drink.

=== Cultivation ===
Xylococcus bicolor is cultivated as an ornamental plant by specialty plant nurseries, for planting in California native plant and wildlife gardens. It forms an interesting shrub with flowers that hummingbirds like. It prefers to have its leaves in full sun, but likes its roots in the shade. This species is tolerant of most soils, but requires excellent drainage. It needs fast draining soil of pH 6–7, in USDA zones 7–10.

This plant is best suited on north-facing, dry rocky slopes. It grows at a moderate pace in a rounded shape, usually about 8 feet (2.4 m) high by 6 ft (1.8 m) wide. It prefers regular light watering over the first summer after planting. After establishment, this drought-tolerant shrub should survive the dry months with no supplemental water, though it can usually handle summer watering infrequently. It provides white and pink blooms over winter and spring, and is hardy down to 20 °F during these months.

=== Propagation ===
This species is notoriously difficult to propagate, and wild seedlings are seldom to survive past a year. Wild seeds are viable, and can be grown successfully provided proper protocols are followed. The fleshy outer layer of the fruit first must be removed, with some putting the fruits with water in a blender to remove the outer layer. Stones are then removed from the blender, and broken open with wire cutters. As the stones are brittle, around half of the seeds can be released undamaged. Seeds that are damaged in this process can be soaked in 0.3% hydrogen peroxide and copper soap to curb pathogens.

Seeds may also be soaked in water to improve germination. However, they germinate best when stratified at 55 °F, often accomplished by placing them in a refrigerator. The treated seeds are placed in a food container on top of fine, moist potting soil, and within two weeks, around half of the seeds will have radicles emerging. Once these radicles emerge, it is recommended to place the seeds into pots, in a soil mix with extra perlite to improve drainage. The delicate plantlets need shade and periodic misting in this period. Eventually, cotyledons will emerge within fibrous sheaths. When the sheaths fall off and release the cotyledons, misting may be stopped, but shade is still required for root development.

== Gallery ==
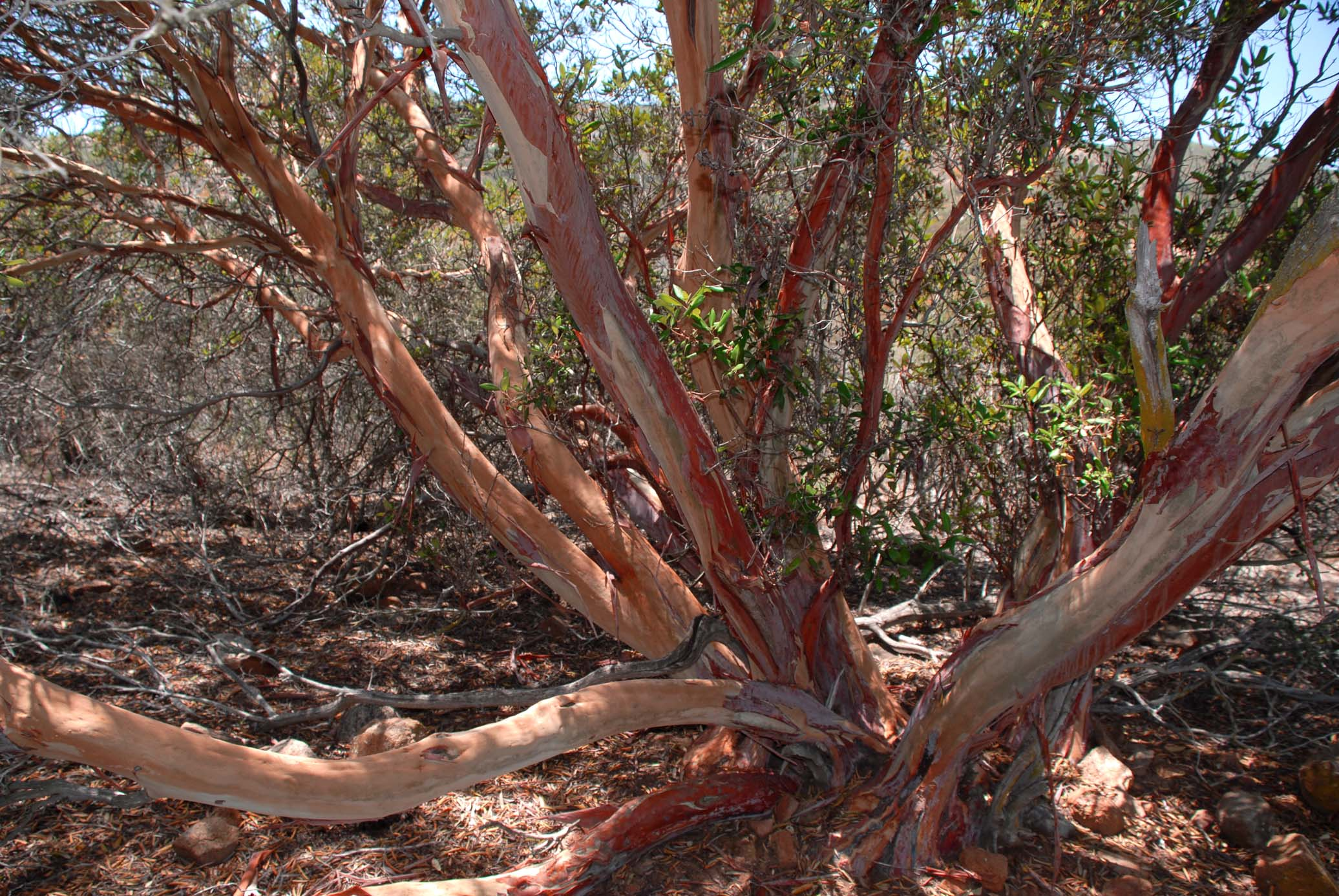
The trunk of an old-growth Xylococcus in San Diego County

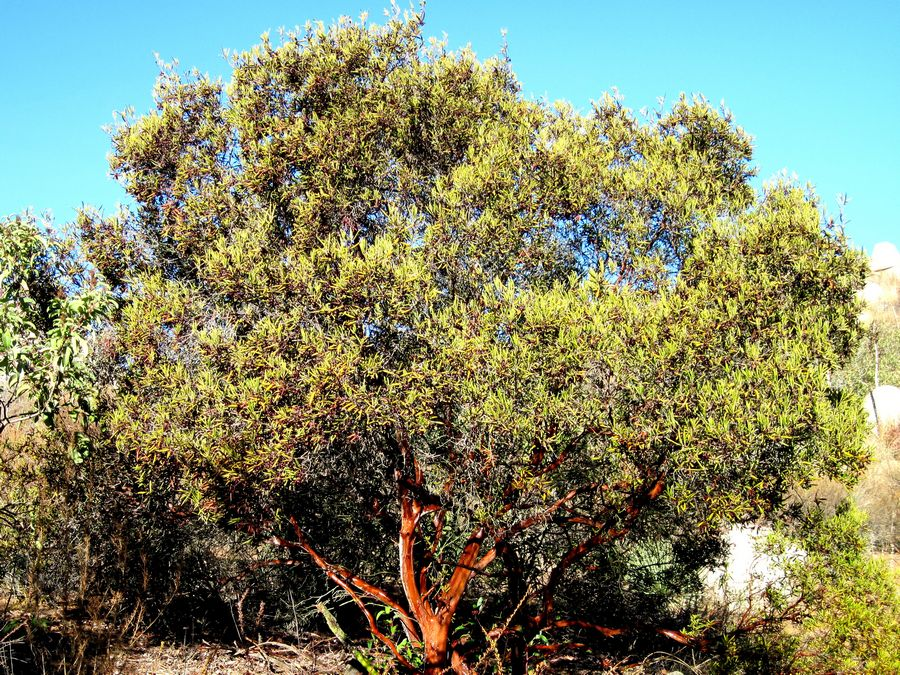
A view of the whole plant

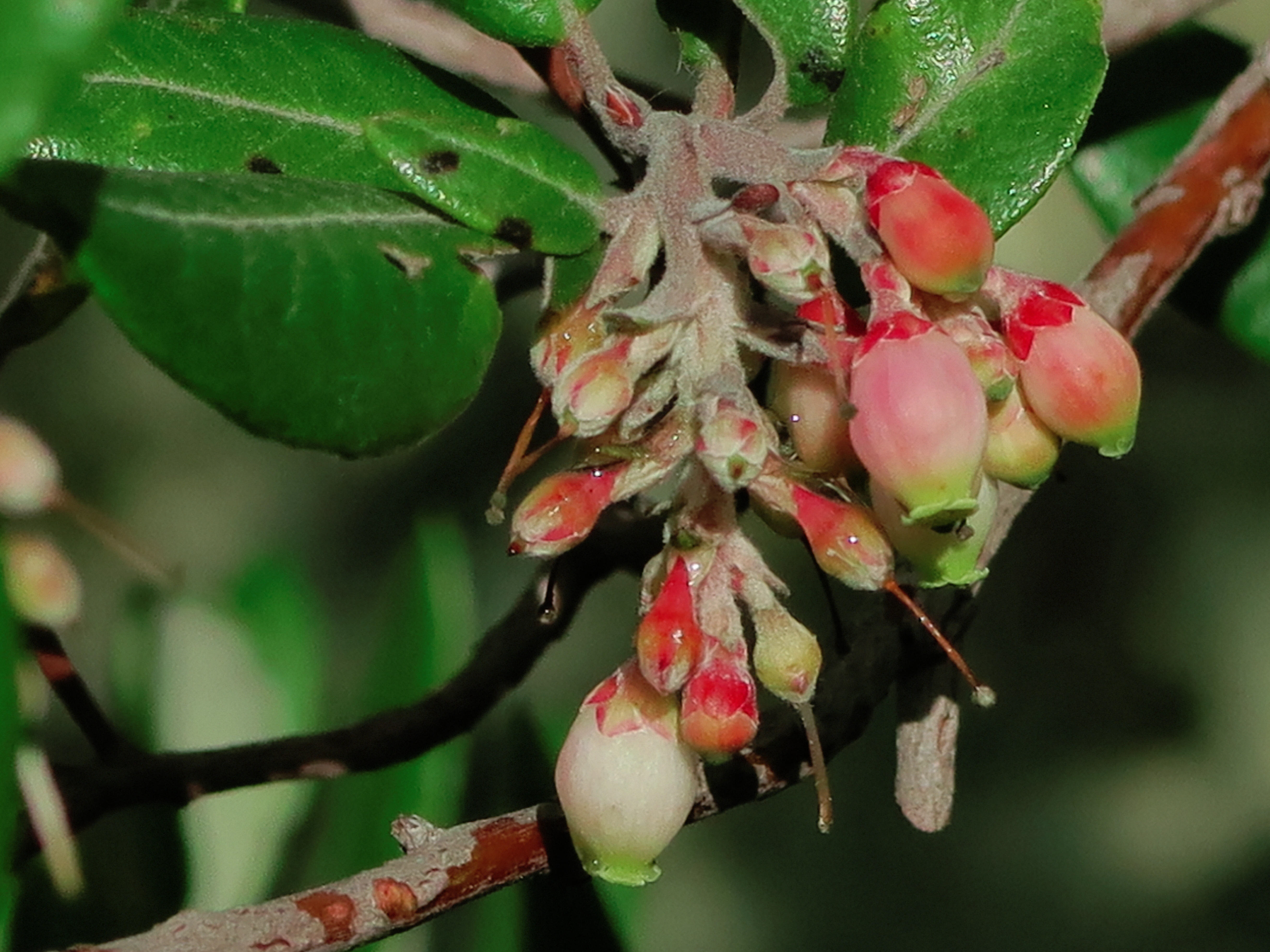
Flowers and flower buds

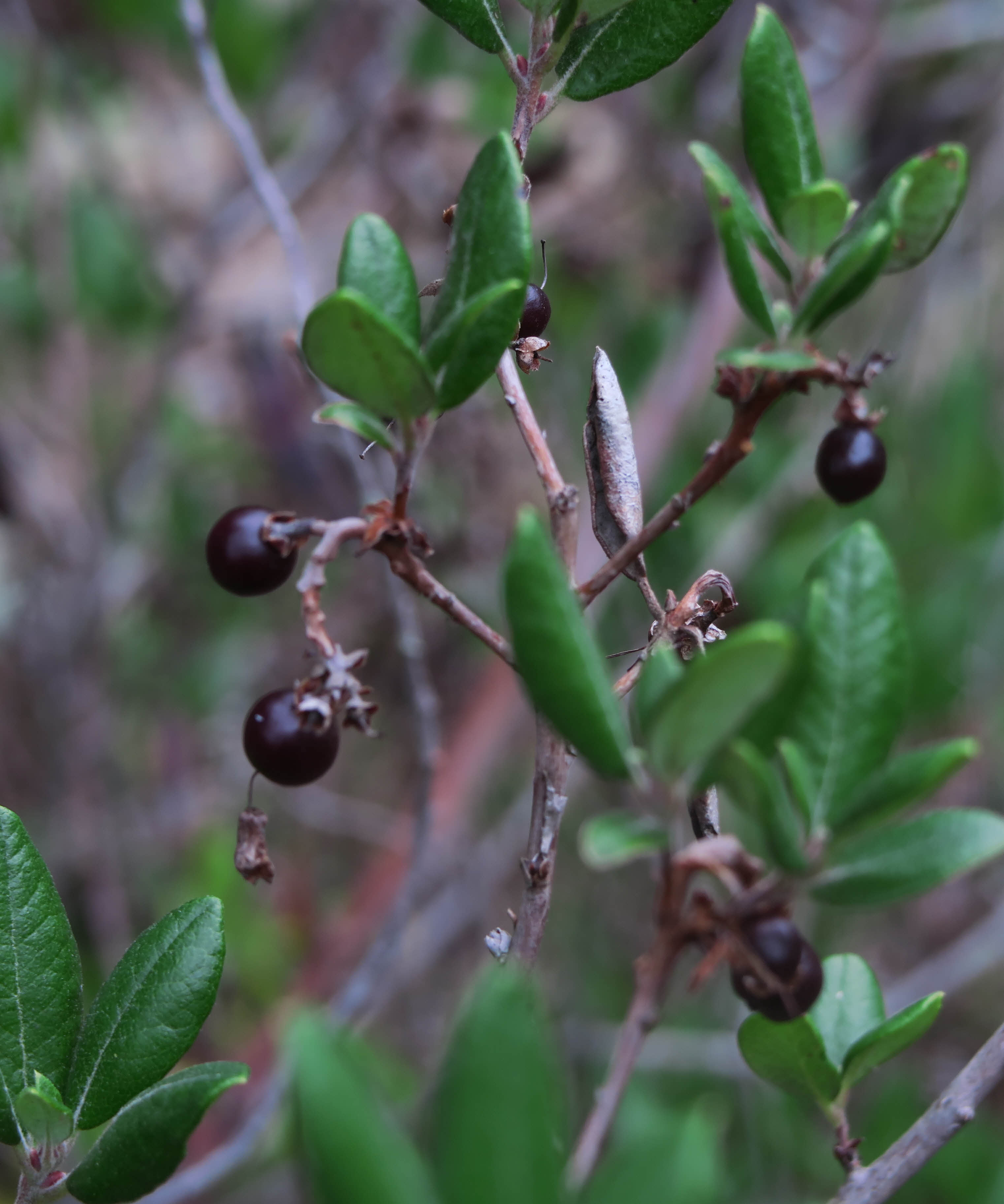
The drupes

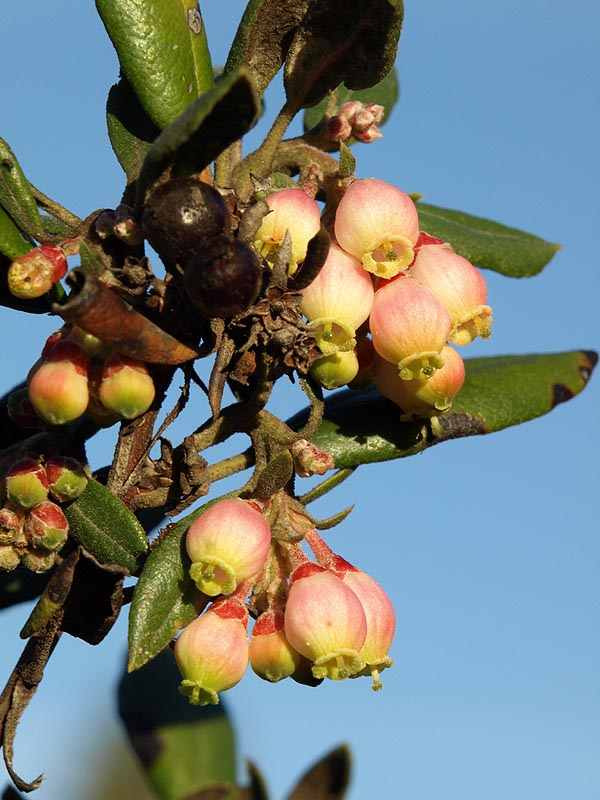
In bloom with old fruit

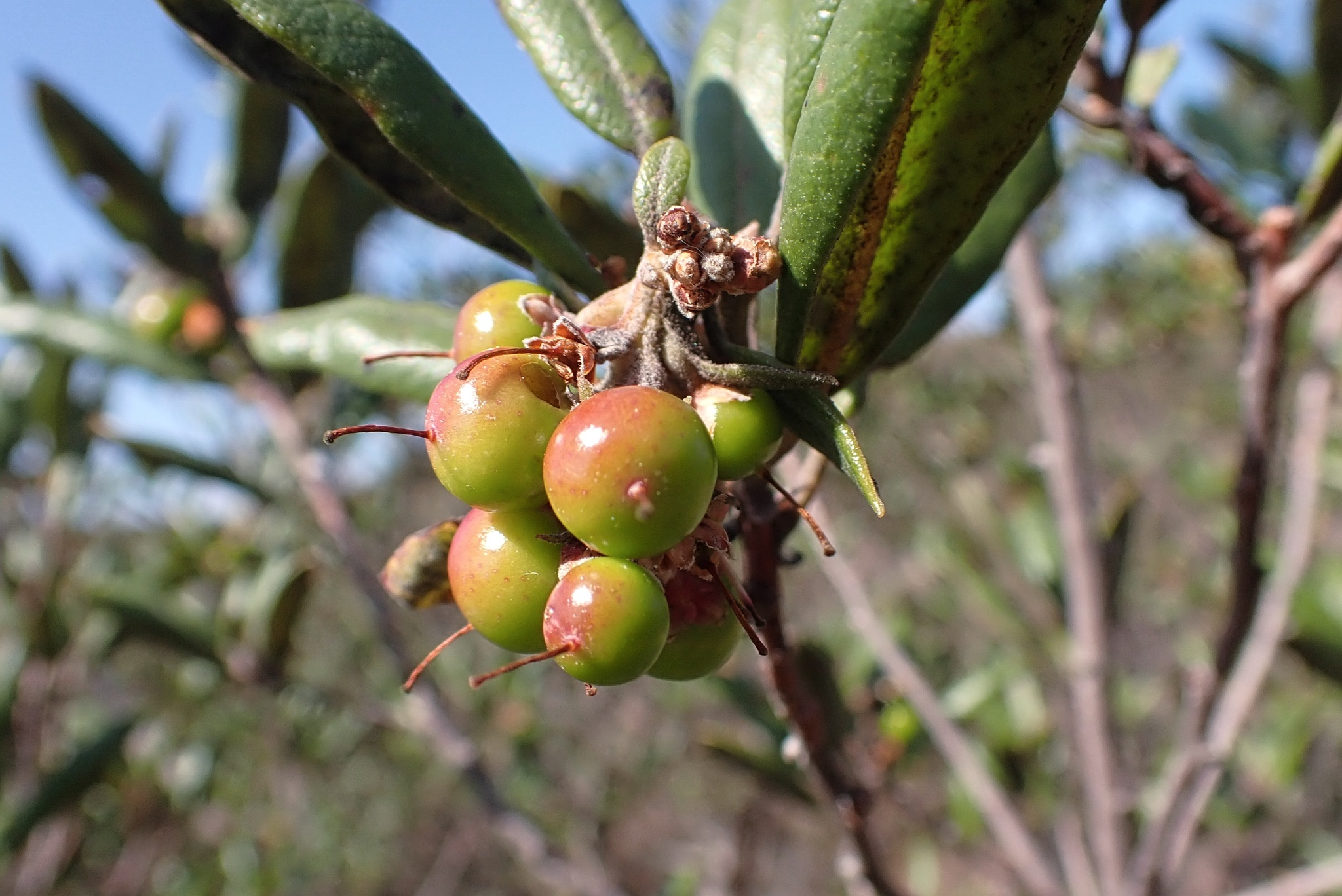
The young fruits

== See also ==
- Ornithostaphylos – Another monotypic Arbutoideae genus in the same region
- Cneoridium – An unrelated (also monotypic) shrub in the same region that also has dark, spherical berries
- Sideroxylon grandiflorum – A drupaceous tree that was (erroneously) believed to have lost its reproductive capabilities due to the extinction of the dodo.
- Cercocarpus traskiae – Another shrub native to California that may go extinct because of the failure of seedlings to survive.
