= Seeds of Destruction =

Seeds of Destruction may refer to:

- Seeds of Destruction (book), a book written by F. William Engdahl
- "Seeds of Destruction" (The Outer Limits), an episode
- EverQuest: Seeds of Destruction, an EverQuest expansion title
