= Jamul Indian Village =

Native Kumeyaay Indians in Southern California

Coordinates: 32°42′10″N 116°52′15″W

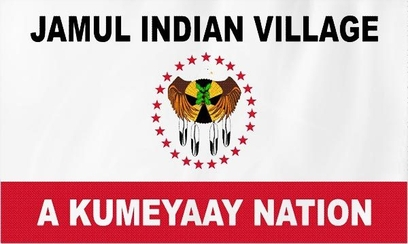

Total population
- 60–120 enrolled members

Regions with significant populations
- United States (California)

Languages
- Ipai, English

Religion
- Traditional tribal religion, Christianity (Roman Catholic)

Related ethnic groups
- other Kumeyaay tribes, Cocopa, Quechan, Paipai, and Kiliwa

The Jamul Indian Village of California is a federally recognized tribe of Kumeyaay Indians, who are sometimes known as Mission Indians.

== Reservation ==
Location of the Jamul Indian Village

The Jamul Indian Village is a federal reservation, located 10 miles (16 km) southeast of El Cajon, in southeastern San Diego County, California. It was established in 1912. It is six acres (24,000 m^{2}) in size. No one lives on the reservation although 20 members lived there in the 1970s. The last population recorded by the United States Census Bureau was in 2000.

== Demographics ==
=== 2020 census ===
Jamul Indian Village, California – Racial and ethnic composition Note: the US Census treats Hispanic/Latino as an ethnic category. This table excludes Latinos from the racial categories and assigns them to a separate category. Hispanics/Latinos may be of any race.
Race / Ethnicity (NH = Non-Hispanic)	Pop 2000	Pop 2010	Pop 2020	% 2000	% 2010	% 2020
White alone (NH)	0	0	0	0.00%	0.00%	0.00%
Black or African American alone (NH)	0	0	0	0.00%	0.00%	0.00%
Native American or Alaska Native alone (NH)	1	0	0	100.00%	0.00%	0.00%
Asian alone (NH)	0	0	0	0.00%	0.00%	0.00%
Native Hawaiian or Pacific Islander alone (NH)	0	0	0	0.00%	0.00%	0.00%
Other race alone (NH)	0	0	0	0.00%	0.00%	0.00%
Mixed race or Multiracial (NH)	0	0	0	0.00%	0.00%	0.00%
Hispanic or Latino (any race)	0	0	0	0.00%	0.00%	0.00%
Total	1	0	0	100.00%	100.00%	100.00%

== Language ==
The traditional language of the Jamul Indian Village and their larger tribal group, the Kumeyaay, is from the Tipai language grouping. The influence of the Spanish Mission system on the retention of the Jamul Indian Village's native tongue can be observed as there are only a small amount of less than 100 tribal members who retain their native language. The Jamul Indian Village as well uses English in modern times as a primary language for communication.

== Government ==
The Jamul Indian Village is headquartered in Jamul, California. The current government for the Jamul Indian Village is a democratically elected tribal council. As of June 2021, Jamul Tribal Council consist of

- Erica M. Pinto, Chairwoman
- Mike Hunter, Vice-Chairman
- Teresa Cousins, Treasurer
- Jasmine Aloese, Secretary
- James Cuero III, Councilman
- Tina Meza, Councilwoman
- James Hunter, Councilman

== History ==
The Jamul Indian Village, as part of the Kumeyaay Nation, traces its roots in present-day San Diego County back approximately 12,000 years. Historically, the Kumeyaay were hunter-gatherers who developed a deep understanding of their environment, engaging in practices such as basket weaving, traditional hunting, and cultural burnings to maintain ecological balance.

In 1769, Spanish explorers established Mission San Diego de Alcalá, initiating a period of significant upheaval for the indigenous populations. While many Kumeyaay villages resisted Spanish colonization, during the 1775 uprising against the mission, the Jamul and Sequan (Sycuan) villages chose not to participate alongside other Tiipay villages in the rebellion.

The Jamul Indian Village reservation was established in 1912, and the tribe gained federal recognition in 1981, affirming their sovereignty and enabling the creation of a formal tribal government.

The Jamul Indian Village has worked to revive and practice many of their ancestral traditions, with a growing number of tribal members honouring their heritage. In 2016, the tribe opened the Hollywood Casino Jamul, which now serves as a significant source of income, though its development has faced ongoing controversy over its impact on the local community.

In December 2024, the U.S. Congress passed the Jamul Indian Village Land Transfer Act, authorizing the transfer of 172 acres into tribal trust.

== Education ==
The village is served by the Jamul-Dulzura Union Elementary School District and Grossmont Union High School District.

== Bibliography ==
- Pritzker, Barry M. (2000). A Native American Encyclopedia: History, Culture, and Peoples. Oxford University Press. ISBN 978-0-19513-877-1.
- Eargle, Dolan H. Jr. (1992). California Indian Country: The Land & the People. San Francisco: Tree Company Press. ISBN 978-0-93740-120-0.
- Shipek, Florence C. (1978). "History of Southern California Mission Indians". In Heizer, Robert F. (ed.). Handbook of North American Indians. Vol. 8: California. Washington, DC: Smithsonian Institution. pp. 610–618. ISBN 978-0-16004-574-5.
