= Carroll Quigley =

American historian (1910–1977)

- Born: November 9, 1910; Boston, Massachusetts, U.S.
- Died: January 3, 1977 (aged 66); Washington, D.C., U.S
- Education: Harvard University
- Occupations: Professor, historian, author
- Known for: Professor at Georgetown University
- Notable work: The Evolution of Civilizations: An Introduction to Historical Analysis (1961); Tragedy & Hope (1966); The Anglo-American Establishment (1981)
- Spouse: Lillian Fox Quigley
- Children: 2
- Awards: Georgetown University Faculty Award (four consecutive years, 1973–1976); Georgetown University's 175th Anniversary Medal of Merit (1964)
- Website: carrollquigley.net

Signature
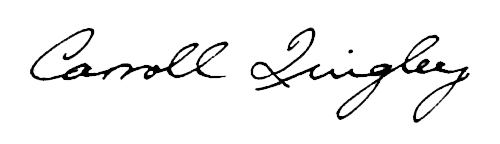

Carroll Quigley (/ˈkwɪɡli/; November 9, 1910 – January 3, 1977) was an American historian and theorist of the evolution of civilizations. He is remembered for his teaching work as a professor at the School of Foreign Service at Georgetown University, and his seminal works, The Evolution of Civilizations: An Introduction to Historical Analysis, and Tragedy And Hope: A History Of The World In Our Time.

== Life and career ==
Quigley was born in Boston, and attended Harvard University, where he studied history and earned B.A, M.A., and Ph.D. degrees. He taught at Princeton University, and then at Harvard, and then from 1941 to 1976 at the School of Foreign Service at Georgetown University.

From 1941 until 1972, he taught a two-semester course at Georgetown on the development of civilizations. According to his obituary in the Washington Star, many alumni of Georgetown's School of Foreign Service asserted that this was "the most influential course in their undergraduate careers".

In addition to his academic work, Quigley served as a consultant to the U.S. Department of Defense, the United States Navy, the Smithsonian Institution, and the House Select Committee on Astronautics and Space Exploration in the 1950s. He was also a book reviewer for the Washington Star, and a contributor and editorial board member of Current History.

Quigley retired from Georgetown in June 1976 after being honored by the student body with its Faculty Award for the fourth consecutive year. He died the following year at Georgetown University Hospital following a heart attack.

=== Major conclusions ===
==== Inclusive diversity ====
Quigley's work emphasized "inclusive diversity" as a core value of Western civilization, contrasting it with the dualism of Plato. He concluded the book Tragedy and Hope with the hope that the West could "resume its development along its old patterns of Inclusive Diversity". From his study of history, "it is clear that the West believes in diversity rather than in uniformity, in pluralism rather than in monism or dualism, in inclusion rather than exclusion, in liberty rather than in authority, in truth rather than in power, in conversion rather than in annihilation, in the individual rather than in the organization, in reconciliation rather than in triumph, in heterogeneity rather than in homogeneity, in relativisms rather than in absolutes, and in approximations rather than in final answers."

Quigley asserted that any intolerance or rigidity in the religious practices of the West are aberrations from its nature of inclusivity and diversity. Quigley points to the tolerance and flexibility in Aquinas's belief that theological truth is revealed over time through dialogue within the Christian community, which allows the community to adapt to a changing world.

==== Institutionalization and the fall of civilizations ====
Having studied the rise and fall of civilizations, "Quigley found the explanation of disintegration in the gradual transformation of social 'instruments' into 'institutions,' that is, transformation of social arrangements functioning to meet real social needs into social institutions serving their own purposes regardless of real social needs".

==== Weapons and democracy ====
From a historical study of weapons and political dynamics, Quigley concludes that the characteristics of weapons are the main predictor of democracy. Democracy tends to emerge only when the best weapons available are easy for individuals to buy and use. This explains why democracy occurs so rarely in human history. In the 1800s (peaking in the 1880s), guns were the best weapon available. In America, almost everyone could afford to buy a gun, and could learn how to use it fairly easily. Governments couldn't do any better: it became the age of mass armies of citizen soldiers with guns. Similarly, Periclean Greece was an age of the citizen soldier and of democracy.

In the 1900s, expensive, specialist weapons (such as tanks and bombers) became available, and citizen soldiers became dominated by specialist soldiers. Quigley notes that the slaughter of World War I (1914–1918) was due to the mismatch between the traditional armies (citizen soldiers) and the available weapons (machine guns used defensively).

=== Style ===
Quigley's writing style is dense, influenced by a former history professor of his:

As we raced along, Goethe was covered in fifteen minutes, Schiller in ten, Fichte in five ... he covered any topic simply by slicing it up into a small number of parts and giving a name to each part. The complex character and achievement of Goethe, for example, were divided into six portions, each was given a title, and, ever after, the whole of Goethe could be evoked merely by reciting six words ... I should like to outdare even my former professor by dividing this greater complexity [Classical culture] into only five parts."

Quigley's analytical style is scientific, stemming from his earlier training in physics.

In this book we are concerned with the social sciences ... and particularly with the effort to apply a scientific method of observation, formulation of hypotheses, and testing to such phenomena. The enormous size of this field has made it advisable to curtail our attention to the process of social change, especially in civilizations.

== Influence on Bill Clinton ==
In his first year (1965) in the School of Foreign Service at Georgetown, Bill Clinton took Quigley's course, receiving a 'B' as his final grade in both semesters (an excellent grade in a course where nearly half the students received D or lower). In 1991, Clinton named Quigley as an important influence on his aspirations and political philosophy, when Clinton launched his presidential campaign in a speech at Georgetown. He said he learned from Quigley that "The future can be better than the past, and that each of us has a personal, moral responsibility to make it so." Bill Clinton told his audiences, "that is what the new choice is all about ... We are not here to save the Democratic party. We are here to save the United States of America." It was Clinton's most effective speech, and he repeated variations time and time again as the blueprint for his campaign message in winning the Democratic nomination and the general election for President of the United States in 1992.

The same remark on American greatness was recalled by Speaker of the House Nancy Pelosi, who met her husband in Quigley's class on African history.

== Quigley and the Round Table group ==
One distinctive feature of Quigley's historical writings is his assertion that the Round Table movement played a significant role in recent world history. His writing on this topic has made Quigley famous among many who investigate conspiracy theories.

=== Quigley and the Milner Group ===
In the "Anglo American Establishment" he focused on the Round Table group founded in 1891 by Cecil Rhodes and Alfred Milner. Quigley argued that "The organization was so modified and so expanded by Milner after the eclipse of Stead in 1899, and especially after the death of Rhodes in 1902, that it took on quite a different organization and character, although it continued to pursue the same goals." Quigley greatly admired the British Empire and lamented that the secret society was not very successful. Historian Robert Rotberg states:

But Quigley was not opposed to what Rhodes and Milner had purportedly tried to accomplish. Indeed, Quigley wrote more in remorse at what had failed than in antagonism to what he believed were their mutual efforts at extending the British Empire.

The society consisted of an inner circle ("The Society of the Elect") and an outer circle ("The Association of Helpers", also known as The Milner Kindergarten and the Round Table Group). The society as a whole did not have a fixed name:

This society has been known at various times as Milner's Kindergarten, as the Round Table Group, as the Rhodes crowd, as The Times crowd, as the All Souls group, and as the Cliveden set. ... I have chosen to call it the Milner group. Those persons who have used the other terms, or heard them used, have not generally been aware that all these various terms referred to the same Group ... this Group is, as I shall show, one of the most important historical facts of the twentieth century.

Quigley assigned this group primary or exclusive credit for several historical events: the Jameson Raid, the Second Boer War, the founding of the Union of South Africa, the replacement of the British Empire with the Commonwealth of Nations, and a number of Britain's foreign policy decisions in the twentieth century.

In 1966, Quigley published a one-volume history of the twentieth century, titled Tragedy and Hope. At several points in this book, the history of the Milner group was discussed. Moreover, Quigley claimed that he had recently been in direct contact with this organization, whose nature he contrasted to right-wing claims of a communist conspiracy:

This radical Right fairy tale, which is now an accepted folk myth in many groups in America, pictured the recent history of the United States, in regard to domestic reform and in foreign affairs, as a well-organized plot by extreme Left-wing elements ... This myth, like all fables, does in fact have a modicum of truth. There does exist, and has existed for a generation, an international Anglophile network which operates, to some extent, in the way the Radical right believes the Communists act. In fact, this network, which we may identify as the Round Table Groups, has no aversion to cooperating with the Communists, or any other group, and frequently does so. I know of the operation of this network because I have studied it for twenty years and was permitted for two years, in the early 1960s, to examine its papers and secret records. I have no aversion to it or to most of its aims and have, for much of my life, been close to it and to many of its instruments. I have objected, both in the past and recently, to a few of its policies ... but in general my chief difference of opinion is that it wishes to remain unknown, and I believe its role in history is significant enough to be known.

According to Quigley, the leaders of this group were Cecil Rhodes and Alfred Milner from 1891 until Rhodes' death in 1902, Milner alone until his own death in 1925, Lionel Curtis from 1925 to 1955, Robert H. (Baron) Brand from 1955 to 1963, and Adam D. Marris from 1963 until the time Quigley wrote his book. This organization also functioned through certain loosely affiliated "front groups", including the Royal Institute of International Affairs, the Institute of Pacific Relations, and the Council on Foreign Relations.

In addition, other secret societies are briefly discussed in Tragedy and Hope, including a consortium of the leaders of the central banks of several countries, who formed the Bank for International Settlements. Historian Robert Rotberg reports that, "Unfortunately, Tragedy and Hope lacks the usual scholarly apparatus. It cites nothing."

=== Citations of Quigley in exposés of purported conspiracies ===
Soon after its publication, Tragedy and Hope caught the attention of authors interested in conspiracies. They proceeded to publicize Quigley's claims, disseminating them to a much larger audience than his original readership.

This began in 1970, when W. Cleon Skousen published The Naked Capitalist: A Review and Commentary on Dr. Carroll Quigley's Book "Tragedy and Hope". The first third of this book consists of extensive excerpts from Tragedy and Hope, interspersed with commentary by Skousen. Skousen quotes Quigley's description of the activities of several groups — the Milner Group, a cartel of international bankers, the Communist Party, the Institute of Pacific Relations, and the Council on Foreign Relations. According to Skousen's interpretation of Quigley's book, each of these is a facet of one large conspiracy. The following year, G. Edward Griffin released the documentary The Capitalist Conspiracy: An Inside View of International Banking, crediting the Skousen book: "We wish to acknowledge that this film was inspired by Cleon Skousen's book, The Naked Capitalist, which we believe is one of the most important documents of the decade." Quigley responded directly to Skousen in a review stating that Skousen "has echoes of the original Nazi 25 point program."

In 1971, Gary Allen, a spokesman for the John Birch Society, published None Dare Call It Conspiracy, which became a bestseller. Allen cited Quigley's Tragedy and Hope as an authoritative source on conspiracies throughout his book. Like Skousen, Allen understood the various conspiracies in Quigley's book to be branches of one large conspiracy, and also connected them to the Bilderbergers and to Richard Nixon. As of the early 21st century the John Birch Society continued to cite Quigley as a primary source for their view of history.

Quigley is also cited by several other authors who assert the existence of powerful conspiracies. Jim Marrs cites Quigley in his book Rule By Secrecy, which describes a conspiracy linking the Milner Group, Skull and Bones, the Trilateral Commission, the Bavarian Illuminati, the Knights Templar, and aliens who posed as the Sumerian gods thousands of years ago. Pat Robertson's book The New World Order cites Quigley as an authority on a powerful conspiracy. Conservative activist Phyllis Schlafly has asserted that Bill Clinton's political success was due to his pursuit of the "world government" agenda he learned from Quigley. G. Edward Griffin relies heavily on Quigley for information about the role Milner's secret society plays in the Federal Reserve in his book The Creature from Jekyll Island: A Second Look at the Federal Reserve.

Quigley was dismissive of the authors who used his writings to support theories of a world domination conspiracy. Of W. Cleon Skousen's The Naked Capitalist he stated:

Skousen's book is full of misrepresentations and factual errors. He claims that I have written of a conspiracy of the super-rich who are pro-Communist and wish to take over the world and that I'm a member of this group. But I never called it a conspiracy and don't regard it as such. I'm not an "insider" of these rich persons, although Skousen thinks so. I happen to know some of them and liked them, although I disagreed with some of the things they did before 1940.

On Gary Allen's None Dare Call It Conspiracy he said:

They thought Dr. Carroll Quigley proved everything. For example, they constantly misquote me to this effect: that Lord Milner (the dominant trustee of the Cecil Rhodes Trust and a heavy in the Round Table Group) helped finance the Bolsheviks. I have been through the greater part of Milner's private papers and have found no evidence to support that. Further, None Dare Call It Conspiracy insists that international bankers were a single bloc, were all powerful and remain so today. I, on the contrary, stated in my book that they were much divided, often fought among themselves, had great influence but not control of political life and were sharply reduced in power about 1931-1940, when they became less influential than monopolized industry.

=== Criticism ===
F. William Engdahl, in an overview of financial imperialism entitled The Gods of Money, criticized Quigley for stating that the power of international bankers declined in the 1930s, and insofar as the influence of international bankers in America was concerned, suggested that Quigley was confusing "international finance" with Morgan interests. He suggested, like Sutton, that Quigley's papers had been vetted. Engdahl argued that it was not the case that the power of "international finance" declined, but rather, Morgan interests fell and were replaced by Rockefeller interests.

Quigley stated that the intentions and objectives of the group he profiled, associated with Wall Street and the City of London and Cecil Rhodes' super-imperialism, were "largely commendable". Members of the group, in statements recorded by the New York Times in 1902, proclaimed that they formed their society for the purpose of "gradually absorbing the wealth of the world".

Quigley argued that the Round Table groups were not World Government advocates but super-imperialists. He stated that they emphatically did not want the League of Nations to become a World Government. Yet Lionel Curtis, who, according to Quigley, was one of the leaders of the Round Table movement, wished for it to be a World government with teeth, writing articles with H. G. Wells urging this.

== Bibliography ==
=== Books written by Quigley ===
- The Evolution of Civilizations: An Introduction to Historical Analysis (1st ed.). New York: Macmillan Publishing Company. 1961. Hardcover. 281 pages.
- Tragedy and Hope: A History of the World in Our Time (1st ed.). New York: Macmillan Publishing Company. 1966. ISBN 978-0026001304. 1,348 pages. Full text
- The Anglo-American Establishment: From Rhodes to Cliveden (PDF) (1st ed.). New York: Books in Focus. 1981. ISBN 0-916728-50-1.
- Weapons Systems and Political Stability: A History (PDF). Washington, DC: University Press of America. 1983. pp. 1064 pages. ISBN 978-0-8191-2947-5.

=== Collected works ===
- Lucchese, Adriano (ed.) (2015). Carroll Quigley: Life, Lectures and Collected Writings. New York: Discovery Publisher. ISBN 978-1516922741.

=== Articles ===
- Quigley, Carroll (October, 1968). "Major Problems of Foreign Policy" Current History 55: 326
- Quigley, Carroll (October, 1968). "Our Ecological Crisis" Current History 59: 347
- Quigley, Carroll (October, 1968). "America's Future in Energy" Current History 69: 407
