= Genetic pollution =

Uncontrolled gene flow into wild populations

Genetic pollution is a term for uncontrolled gene flow into wild populations. It is defined as "the dispersal of contaminated altered genes from genetically engineered organisms to natural organisms, esp. by cross-pollination", but has come to be used in some broader ways. It is related to the population genetics concept of gene flow, and genetic rescue, which is genetic material intentionally introduced to increase the fitness of a population. It is called genetic pollution when it negatively impacts the fitness of a population, such as through outbreeding depression and the introduction of unwanted phenotypes which can lead to extinction.

Conservation biologists and conservationists have used the term to describe gene flow from domestic, feral, and non-native species into wild indigenous species, which they consider undesirable. They promote awareness of the effects of introduced invasive species that may "hybridize with native species, causing genetic pollution". In the fields of agriculture, agroforestry and animal husbandry, genetic pollution is used to describe gene flows between genetically engineered species and wild relatives. The use of the word "pollution" is meant to convey the idea that mixing genetic information is bad for the environment, but because the mixing of genetic information can lead to a variety of outcomes, "pollution" may not always be the most accurate descriptor.

== Gene flow to wild population ==
Some conservation biologists and conservationists have used genetic pollution for a number of years as a term to describe gene flow from a non-native, invasive subspecies, domestic, or genetically-engineered population to a wild indigenous population.

=== Importance ===
The introduction of genetic material into the gene pool of a population by human intervention can have both positive and negative effects on populations. When genetic material is intentionally introduced to increase the fitness of a population, this is called genetic rescue. When genetic material is unintentionally introduced to a population, this is called genetic pollution and can negatively affect the fitness of a population (primarily through outbreeding depression), introduce other unwanted phenotypes, or theoretically lead to extinction.

=== Introduced species ===
An introduced species is one that is not native to a given population that is either intentionally or accidentally brought into a given ecosystem. Effects of introduction are highly variable, but if an introduced species has a major negative impact on its new environment, it can be considered an invasive species. One such example is the introduction of the Asian Longhorned beetle in North America, which was first detected in 1996 in Brooklyn, New York. It is believed that these beetles were introduced through cargo at trade ports. The beetles are highly damaging to the environment, and are estimated to cause risk to 35% of urban trees, excluding natural forests. These beetles cause severe damage to the wood of trees by larval funneling. Their presence in the ecosystem destabilizes community structure, having a negative influence on many species in the system.

Introduced species are not always disruptive to an environment, however. Tomás Carlo and Jason Gleditch of Penn State University found that the number of "invasive" honeysuckle plants in the area correlated with the number and diversity of the birds in the Happy Valley Region of Pennsylvania, suggesting introduced honeysuckle plants and birds formed a mutually beneficial relationship. Presence of introduced honeysuckle was associated with higher diversity of the bird populations in that area, demonstrating that introduced species are not always detrimental to a given environment and it is completely context dependent.

==== Invasive species ====
Conservation biologists and conservationists have, for a number of years, used the term to describe gene flow from domestic, feral, and non-native species into wild indigenous species, which they consider undesirable. For example, TRAFFIC is the international wildlife trade monitoring network that works to limit trade in wild plants and animals so that it is not a threat to conservationist goals. They promote awareness of the effects of introduced invasive species that may "hybridize with native species, causing genetic pollution". Furthermore, the Joint Nature Conservation Committee, the statutory adviser to the UK government, has stated that invasive species "will alter the genetic pool (a process called genetic pollution), which is an irreversible change."

Invasive species can invade both large and small native populations and have a profound effect. Upon invasion, invasive species interbreed with native species to form sterile or more evolutionarily fit hybrids that can outcompete the native populations. Invasive species can cause extinctions of small populations on islands that are particularly vulnerable due to their smaller amounts of genetic diversity. In these populations, local adaptations can be disrupted by the introduction of new genes that may not be as suitable for the small island environments. For example, the Cercocarpus traskiae of the Catalina Island off the coast of California has faced near extinction with only a single population remaining due to the hybridization of its offspring with Cercocarpus betuloides.

=== Domestic populations ===
Increased contact between wild and domesticated populations of organisms can lead to reproductive interactions that are detrimental to the wild population's ability to survive. A wild population is one that lives in natural areas and is not regularly looked after by humans. This contrasts with domesticated populations that live in human controlled areas and are regularly, and historically, in contact with humans. Genes from domesticated populations are added to wild populations as a result of reproduction. In many crop populations this can be the result of pollen traveling from farmed crops to neighboring wild plants of the same species. For farmed animals, this reproduction may happen as the result of escaped or released animals.

A popular example of this phenomenon is the gene flow between wolves and domesticated dogs. The New York Times cites, from the words of biologist Luigi Boitani, "Although wolves and dogs have always lived in close contact in Italy and have presumably mated in the past, the newly worrisome element, in Dr. Boitani's opinion, is the increasing disparity in numbers, which suggests that interbreeding will become fairly common. As a result, 'genetic pollution of the wolf gene pool might reach irreversible levels', he warned. 'By hybridization, dogs can easily absorb the wolf genes and destroy the wolf, as it is,' he said. The wolf might survive as a more doglike animal, better adapted to living close to people, he said, but it would not be 'what we today call a wolf.'"

==== Aquaculture ====
Aquaculture is the practice of farming aquatic animals or plants for the purpose of consumption. This practice is becoming increasingly common for the production of salmon. This is specifically termed aquaculture of salmonids. One of the dangers of this practice is the possibility of domesticated salmon breaking free from their containment. The occurrence of escaping incidents is becoming increasingly common as aquaculture gains popularity. Farming structures may be ineffective at holding the vast number of fast growing animals they house. Natural disasters, high tides, and other environmental occurrences can also trigger aquatic animal escapes. The reason these escapes are considered dangers is the impact they pose for the wild population they reproduce with after escaping. In many instances the wild population experiences a decreased likelihood of survival after reproducing with domesticated populations of salmon.

The Washington Department of Fish and Wildlife cites that "commonly expressed concerns surrounding escaped Atlantic salmon include competition with native salmon, predation, disease transfer, hybridization, and colonization." A report done by that organization in 1999 did not find that escaped salmon posed a significant risk to wild populations.

In major river basins like the Volga, sturgeon stocking and aquaculture have occasionally led to the release of non-native genetic lineages and hybrids from geographically distant populations. While modern genetic testing of seed stock helps mitigate the breeding of regionally alien forms, the unintentional introduction of genetically distinct sturgeon lineages remains a conservation challenge, contributing to the genetic pollution of native wild populations.

==== Crops ====
Crops refer to groups of plants grown for consumption. Despite domestication over many years, these plants are not so far removed from their wild relatives that they couldn't reproduce if brought together. Many crops are still grown in the areas they originated and gene flow between crops and wild relatives impacts the evolution of wild populations. Farmers can avoid reproduction between the different populations by timing their planting of crops so that crops are not flowering when wild relatives would be. Domesticated crops have been changed through artificial selection and genetic engineering. The genetic make-ups of many crops is different from those of their wild relatives, but the closer they grow to one another the more likely they are to share genes through pollen. Gene flow persists between crops and wild counterparts.

=== Genetically engineered organisms ===
Genetically engineered organisms are genetically modified in a laboratory, and therefore distinct from those that were bred through artificial selection. In the fields of agriculture, agroforestry and animal husbandry, genetic pollution is being used to describe gene flows between GE species and wild relatives. An early use of the term "genetic pollution" in this later sense appears in a wide-ranging review of the potential ecological effects of genetic engineering in The Ecologist magazine in July 1989. It was also popularized by environmentalist Jeremy Rifkin in his 1998 book The Biotech Century. While intentional crossbreeding between two genetically distinct varieties is described as hybridization with the subsequent introgression of genes, Rifkin, who had played a leading role in the ethical debate for over a decade before, used genetic pollution to describe what he considered to be problems that might occur due to the unintentional process of (modernly) genetically modified organisms (GMOs) dispersing their genes into the natural environment by breeding with wild plants or animals.

Concerns about negative consequences from gene flow between genetically engineered organisms and wild populations are valid. Most corn and soybean crops grown in the midwestern USA are genetically modified. There are corn and soybean varieties that are resistant to herbicides like glyphosate and corn that produces neonicotinoid pesticide within all of its tissues. These genetic modifications are meant to increase yields of crops but there is little evidence that yields actually increase. While scientists are concerned genetically engineered organisms can have negative effects on surrounding plant and animal communities, the risk of gene flow between genetically engineered organisms and wild populations is yet another concern. Many farmed crops may be weed resistant and reproduce with wild relatives. More research is necessary to understand how much gene flow between genetically engineered crops and wild populations occurs, and the impacts of genetic mixing.

==== Mutated organisms ====
Mutations within organisms can be executed through the process of exposing the organism to chemicals or radiation in order to generate mutations. This has been done in plants in order to create mutants that have a desired trait. These mutants can then be bred with other mutants or individuals that are not mutated in order to maintain the mutant trait. However, similar to the risks associated with introducing individuals to a certain environment, the variation created by mutated individuals could have a negative impact on native populations as well.

==== Preventive measures ====
Since 2005 there has existed a GM Contamination Register, launched for GeneWatch UK and Greenpeace International that records all incidents of intentional or accidental release of organisms genetically modified using modern techniques.

Genetic use restriction technologies (GURTs) were developed for the purpose of property protection, but could be beneficial in preventing the dispersal of transgenes. GeneSafe technologies introduced a method that became known as "Terminator." This method is based on seeds that produce sterile plants. This would prevent movement of transgenes into wild populations as hybridization would not be possible. However, this technology has never been deployed as it disproportionately negatively affects farmers in developing countries, who save seeds to use each year (whereas in developed countries, farmers generally buy seeds from seed production companies).

Physical containment has also been utilized to prevent the escape of transgenes. Physical containment includes barriers such as filters in labs, screens in greenhouses, and isolation distances in the field. Isolation distances have not always been successful, such as transgene escape from an isolated field into the wild in herbicide-resistant bentgrass Agrostis stolonifera.

Another suggested method that applies specifically to protection traits (e.g. pathogen resistance) is mitigation. Mitigation involves linking the positive trait (beneficial to fitness) to a trait that is negative (harmful to fitness) to wild but not domesticated individuals. In this case, if the protection trait was introduced to a weed, the negative trait would also be introduced in order to decrease overall fitness of the weed and decrease possibility of the individual's reproduction and thus propagation of the transgene.

==== Risks ====
Not all genetically engineered organisms cause genetic pollution. Genetic engineering has a variety of uses and is specifically defined as a direct manipulation of the genome of an organism. Genetic pollution can occur in response to the introduction of a species that is not native to a particular environment, and genetically engineered organisms are examples of individuals that could cause genetic pollution following introduction. Due to these risks, studies have been done in order to assess the risks of genetic pollution associated with organisms that have been genetically engineered:

1. Genetic In a 10-year study of four different crops, none of the genetically engineered plants were found to be more invasive or more persistent than their conventional counterparts. An often cited claimed example of genetic pollution is the reputed discovery of transgenes from GE maize in landraces of maize in Oaxaca, Mexico. The report from Quist and Chapela, has since been discredited on methodological grounds. The scientific journal that originally published the study concluded that "the evidence available is not sufficient to justify the publication of the original paper." More recent attempts to replicate the original studies have concluded that genetically modified corn is absent from southern Mexico in 2003 and 2004.
2. A 2009 study verified the original findings of the controversial 2001 study, by finding transgenes in about 1% of 2000 samples of wild maize in Oaxaca, Mexico, despite Nature retracting the 2001 study and a second study failing to back up the findings of the initial study. The study found that the transgenes are common in some fields, but non-existent in others, hence explaining why a previous study failed to find them. Furthermore, not every laboratory method managed to find the transgenes.
3. A 2004 study performed near an Oregon field trial for a genetically modified variety of creeping bentgrass (Agrostis stolonifera) revealed that the transgene and its associate trait (resistance to the glyphosate herbicide) could be transmitted by wind pollination to resident plants of different Agrostis species, up to 14 kilometres (8.7 mi) from the test field. In 2007, the Scotts Company, producer of the genetically modified bentgrass, agreed to pay a civil penalty of $500,000 to the United States Department of Agriculture (USDA). The USDA alleged that Scotts "failed to conduct a 2003 Oregon field trial in a manner which ensured that neither glyphosate-tolerant creeping bentgrass nor its offspring would persist in the environment".

Not only are there risks in terms of genetic engineering, but there are risks that emerge from species hybridization. In Czechoslovakia, ibex were introduced from Turkey and Sinai to help promote the ibex population there, which caused hybrids that produced offspring too early, which caused the overall population to disappear completely. The genes of each population of the ibex in Turkey and Sinai were locally adapted to their environments so when placed in a new environmental context did not flourish. Additionally, the environmental toll that may arise from the introduction of a new species may be so disruptive that the ecosystem is no longer able to sustain certain populations.

== Controversy ==
=== Environmentalist perspectives ===
The use of the word "pollution" in the term genetic pollution has a deliberate negative connotation and is meant to convey the idea that mixing genetic information is bad for the environment. However, because the mixing of genetic information can lead to a variety of outcomes, "pollution" may not be the most accurate descriptor. Gene flow is undesirable according to some environmentalists and conservationists, including groups such as Greenpeace, TRAFFIC, and GeneWatch UK.

"Invasive species have been a major cause of extinction throughout the world in the past few hundred years. Some of them prey on native wildlife, compete with it for resources, or spread disease, while others may hybridize with native species, causing "genetic pollution". In these ways, invasive species are as big a threat to the balance of nature as the direct overexploitation by humans of some species."

It can also be considered undesirable if it leads to a loss of fitness in the wild populations. The term can be associated with the gene flow from a mutation bred, synthetic organism or genetically engineered organism to a non GE organism, by those who consider such gene flow detrimental. These environmentalist groups stand in complete opposition to the development and production of genetically engineered organisms.

=== Governmental definition ===
From a governmental perspective, genetic pollution is defined as follows by the Food and Agriculture Organization of the United Nations:

"Uncontrolled spread of genetic information (frequently referring to transgenes) into the genomes of organisms in which such genes are not present in nature."

=== Scientific perspectives ===
Use of the term 'genetic pollution' and similar phrases such as genetic deterioration, genetic swamping, genetic takeover, and genetic aggression, are being debated by scientists as many do not find it scientifically appropriate. Rhymer and Simberloff argue that these types of terms:

...imply either that hybrids are less fit than the parentals, which need not be the case, or that there is an inherent value in "pure" gene pools.

They recommend that gene flow from invasive species be termed genetic mixing since:

"Mixing" need not be value-laden, and we use it here to denote mixing of gene pools whether or not associated with a decline in fitness.

== See also ==
- Back-breeding
- Biodiversity
- Bioethics
- Conservation biology
- Dysgenics
- Gene pool
- Genetic erosion
- Genetic monitoring
- Introgression
- Miscegenation
- Seeds of Destruction: Hidden Agenda of Genetic Manipulation
- Starlink corn recall
