= Tragedy and Hope =

1966 book by Carroll Quigley

Tragedy and Hope: A History of The World in Our Time
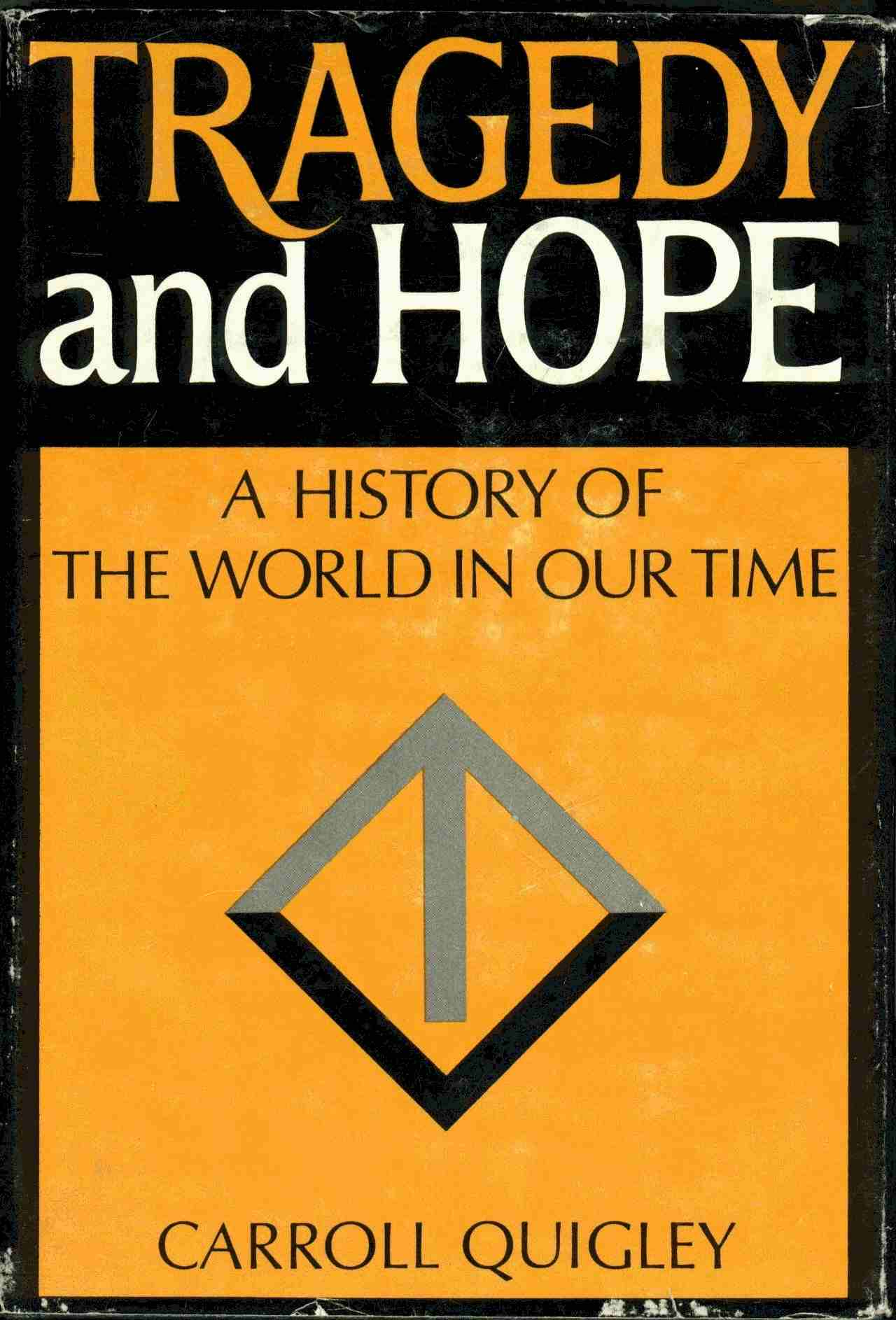
- Author: Carroll Quigley
- Language: English
- Publisher: The Macmillan Company
- Publication date: 1966
- Publication place: United States
- Media type: Print (Hardback)
- Pages: 1,348
- ISBN: 978-0026001304
- Preceded by: The Evolution of Civilizations
- Followed by: The Anglo-American Establishment

Tragedy and Hope: A History of the World in Our Time is a work of history written by former Georgetown University professor and historian Carroll Quigley. The book covers the period of roughly 1880 to 1963 and is multidisciplinary in nature though perhaps focusing on the economic problems brought about by the First World War and the impact these had on subsequent events. While global in scope, the book focuses on Western civilization.

The book has attracted the attention of those interested in geopolitics due to Quigley's assertion that a secret society initially led by Cecil Rhodes, Alfred Milner and others had considerable influence over British and American foreign policy in the first half of the twentieth century. From 1909 to 1913, Milner organized the outer ring of this society as the semi-secret Round Table groups.

The book is written based on archived files from the Council on Foreign Relations.

== Introduction: Western Civilization in its world setting ==
=== Cultural evolution in civilizations ===
Quigley summarizes his historical outlook, which he expounds in his book The Evolution of Civilisations.

Civilisations tend to evolve through a sequence of phases as follows:

1. Mixture
2. Gestation
3. Expansion
4. Conflict
5. Universal Empire
6. Decay
7. Invasion

Western civilisation has reached an age of conflict several times, and each time reformed itself and entered a new age of expansion. From the decay of Classical civilisation, Western society grew out of a mixture of cultures: Roman, barbarian, Saracen, and above all, Judeo-Christian.

The birth of Western civilisation saw a shift to the following elements:

- military: fighting on horses
- energy: animal power
- agriculture: three-field rotation
- politics: decentralized, private (feudal) power

An unequal distribution of power in feudal times allowed for an accumulation of capital. This was the West's first age of expansion, 970–1270. Feudal interest groups dominated and stifled growth, leading to the West's first age of conflict, 1270–1420. This period included class conflict, the Hundred Years' War, and the black plague.

England took over the core of Western civilization, but before they achieved an age of universal empire, society was reorganized to circumvent vested interests. Commercial capitalism allowed a second Age of Expansion, 1440–1680, characterized by trade in luxury goods over long distances.

Over time, traders sought to make profits by controlling the market rather than by facilitating trade, leading to the West's second age of conflict, 1690–1815. This period included class struggles and the second Hundred Years' War. France took over most of Western civilization, but before they achieved an age of universal empire, society was again reorganized to circumvent vested interests. Industrial capitalism allowed a third age of expansion, 1770–1929.

Over time, financiers sought to make profits by controlling the market rather than by industrial production, leading to the West's third age of conflict, beginning in 1893 (note that this overlaps with the third age of expansion. Quigley explains in Evolution of Civilisations that history doesn't always divide neatly into separate phases.)

Germany took over the core of Western civilization by 1942, but was not able to achieve an age of universal empire. At the time of writing, Quigley notes that it is too early to tell whether there will in fact be an age of universal empire (dominated by the United States), or whether there will be means for a new age of expansion.

Western civilization handily destroyed (or is destroying) other civilizations because while the West was in an age of expansion, the others were in ages of decay. Examples include the Mogul Empire in India in the 18th century and the Ottoman Empire in Turkey after 1774. The only civilization the West encountered which wasn't in its age of decay is Orthodox civilization (the Soviet Empire), which had an age of expansion from 1500 to 1900, then renewed from an age of conflict (1900–20) to a second age of expansion (since 1921).

Much of the 20th century can be understood as dynamics involving expanding oceanic Western civilization, expanding continental Orthodox civilization, and a buffer fringe of dying civilizations (Islamic, Hindu, Chinese, Japanese).

=== Cultural diffusion in Western Civilization ===
Cultural elements diffuse outward from a civilization's core to its periphery. Physical aspects of culture (e.g. tools and technologies) diffuse quicker than nonphysical aspects (e.g. beliefs, arts). The periphery is thus more materialistic than the core. An example is the United States, on the periphery of Western civilization.

As material elements diffuse to the periphery, the periphery gets stronger, while growth in the core of the civilization gets hampered by the growth of vested interests and a shift in interest to nonmaterial things. Thus cars and radios were European inventions, but were much more widely developed and used in America, where the culture more readily adapted to them.

Material elements also diffuse more quickly from one civilization to another. Thus civilizations tend to have technologies in common, and it is mostly nonmaterial things that distinguish civilizations.

Receiving material elements from another society can be good (Plains Indians receiving horses) or bad (trans-Appalachian Indians receiving measles). A new element is generally good for a society if the element is helpful, can be made within the society, and can be integrated with the nonmaterial culture of the society. By cultural diffusion, Western civilization demoralized other societies as much as it physically destroyed them.

Survivors of a destroyed culture may be able to integrate the cultural debris they find themselves in, and develop something new. An example is Western civilization growing out of the debris of Classical civilization. If a new Civilization is born out of the debris of the dying Buffer Fringe civilizations, it could balance the growth of Soviet civilization in Eurasia. (p12–14)

Western technologies can mainly be categorized as:

1. Killing: weapons
2. Preserving life: sanitation and medical services
3. Production: food and industry
4. Overcoming distance: transportation and communication

The order these categories arrive in a civilization will greatly impact the civilization. For example, the West generally experienced the agricultural revolution before the industrial revolution, so that fewer people were needed on farms and surplus labour was available for factories. The Soviet Union, on the other hand, experienced the industrial revolution before the agricultural revolution, and obtained food for factory labourers by oppressing farmers. (pp15–20)

Improved technologies created population explosions. The timing of these explosions in different areas can help us understand the following events:

- Around 1850: Anglo-French rivalry, as both countries had exploding populations
- After 1900: Anglo-French alliance, in fear of Germany's exploding population
- After 1950: The free-world alliance, in fear of the Soviet Union's exploding population
- By 2000 (predicted): Asia's exploding population

In 1830, governments couldn't get weapons much better than those usable by individuals. Democracy flourished in Europe and America, where most individuals could afford to buy these weapons.

By 1930–1950, governments had weapons (armoured cars, flame throwers etc.) which could dominate individuals, especially in countries where the industrial revolution and the agricultural revolution came late, such that the standard of living was too low and prices too high for most individuals to afford significant weaponry. Thus Asiatic countries did not have democracies in the mid-1900s.

Much of the book deals with the consequences of different regions receiving technological revolutions in different orders. (pp22–23)

=== Europe's shift to the twentieth century ===
The European outlook greatly changed in the 20th century. The 19th century was characterized by (1) belief in the innate goodness of man, (2) secularism, (3) belief in progress, (4) liberalism, (5) capitalism, (6) faith in science, (7) democracy, (8) nationalism. Two world wars and the Great Depression largely modified if not destroyed these beliefs. (p24–28)

== Western Civilization to 1914 ==
=== The pattern of change ===
To analyze cultural change, Quigley divides it into 6 interrelated aspects:

- Military: The organization of force
- Political: The organization of power
- Economic: The organization of wealth
- Social
- Religious
- Intellectual

Furthermore, Quigley claims to simplify (even oversimplify) his analysis, and then gradually build in real-world complexities.

==== Military developments ====
Classical Greece had a period of mass armies and citizen-soldiers using amateur weapons (the Age of Pericles). Western civilization did too, in the 19th century. Both periods were preceded by periods of professional soldiers using specialist weapons. A period of amateur weapons means that power is fairly equal, and democracy rises. A period of specialist weapons means that a minority can dominate the majority, and authoritarianism rises. A mounted knight, defended by a stone castle, is an example of specialist weapons leading to authoritarianism (feudalism).

A citizen with a Colt revolver in 1840 is an example of an amateur weapon leading to democracy and mass armies of citizen-soldiers. Since transportation and communication technologies of the time did not allow for the real-time control of dispersed armies, battle plans became highly planned in advance, and armies merely awaited the signal. By 1914, all European countries used this method, and leaped at each other over a minor, peripheral matter.

By the mid-1900s, specialist weapons (tanks, the atomic bomb) were replacing amateur weapons, and democracy was giving way to authoritarian government. (p35)

==== Political developments ====
From the localism of the early Middle Ages, methods were needed to attain allegiance from a growing area and an increasing population. Feudal monarchy allowed the state to reappear, and dynastic monarchy allowed for allegiance to be impersonal and thus more expansive. Further developments in technology required allegiance over an even larger area, and nationalism appeared. By 1940, technology allowed for continental allegiances, and nationalism was giving way to larger ideological power blocs.

Even while the development of specialist weapons was a force for authoritarian government, Britain's international influence led to a spreading of the democratic parliamentary system.

==== Economic developments ====
Quigley divides economic issues into four aspects: energy, materials, organization, and control. (p37)

1) Energy: Before about 1000AD, energy came from human labour (often slavery). Then, until about 1830, it was from animal labour. Then, from fuel consumed in engines.

2) Materials: The age of iron (before 1830), then the age of steel (to 1910), then the modern age.

3) Organization: The West has moved through several forms of capitalism as follows (with each form surviving to some degree through to the present):

- Industrial capitalism (1770–1870): Private firms controlled by owners, profiting from the manufacture of goods.
- Financial capitalism (1850–1932): Corporations controlled by bankers, profiting from the manipulation of claims on money.
- Monopoly capitalism (1890–1950): Cartels controlled by managers, profiting from manipulation of the market.
- Pluralist economy (1934–present): Lobbying groups controlled by technocrats.

4) Control: The West's economy has had automatic control in 2 eras: Manorial custom, 650–1150, and competitive laissez-faire, 1815–1934. The West's economy has had conscious control in 2 eras: Mercantilism, 1150–1815, and the planning era, 1934- .

==== Social developments ====
Quigley names several recent social phenomena: 1) demographic change, 2) rural/urban migration, and 3) class dynamics.

1) Demographic change: Around 1900, Europe was passing from a stage of rising population to a stage of stabilizing, older population.

2) Rural/urban migration: Around 1900, Europe was passing from the "rise of the city" to the "rise of the suburbs".

3) Class dynamics: Due to the economy shifting from industrial capitalism to financial and monopoly capitalism, a two-class society developed into a middle-class society (thus Karl Marx's analysis of class struggle no longer matched reality). Reasons included the following:

1. mass production required mass consumption
2. higher-tech production required fewer labourers and more managers
3. the corporate model of organization allowed for the dispersal of ownership

==== Religious and intellectual developments ====
From the 19th century's materialism and secularism, the West has become more spiritual and religious in the 20th century. From the 19th century's optimism and scientific outlook, the West has become more pessimistic and irrational. This new outlook began in such thinkers as Freud and Proust.

=== European economic developments ===
The West has gone through 6 stages of economic development, including 4 forms of capitalism. This development has 3 notable features:

1. Each stage created the conditions for the next, thus bringing about its own demise.
2. Each transition between stages had an associated economic lull, due to the vested interests of the earlier stage only looking out for themselves. All forms of social organization get vested interests, but capitalism especially.
3. In all forms of capitalism, people can lose sight of their goals (prosperity, security, moral uplift, etc.) because of the focus on profit. Capitalism can achieve these goals at times, and destroy these goals at times.

==== Commercial capitalism ====
Commercial capitalism has twice transformed into mercantilism. That is, profit based on trade and expansion has transformed into profit based on control and restriction. Merchants kept profit up by reducing competition. (p44)

As merchants accumulated profits, some became financiers. There was a conflict of preferences: Financiers prefer high interest rates, merchants prefer low interest rates. As financial matters are more easily hidden and confused, financiers could get away with manipulating matters to their own advantage. In particular, financiers prefer no inflation, and were able to persuade the business community to accept it, by calling it "sound money".

International financiers were able to control inflation by persuading governments to base money on limited commodities, such as gold. They also persuaded governments that private bankers should handle monetary policy. Thus the Bank of England was founded privately in 1694. (p47–48)

==== Industrial capitalism, 1770–1850 ====
The creation of bank notes (paper money) meant that trade seldom involved payment in gold. Since gold sat in banks, rarely redeemed, banks could create much more paper money than was actually backed by gold. Private banks could create money out of nothing (by printing paper money), and charge interest on it. (p48–49) The industrial revolution (the use of nonliving sources of power) allowed huge profits, which could then be reinvested, and so early industrial capitalism was largely self-financed or locally financed. The railroad boom required so much capital, however, that large-scale borrowing was required, and international financiers became investment bankers. This gave rise to financial capitalism. (p50)

==== Financial capitalism, 1850–1931 ====
Quigley explains that this section of the book is long, due to its importance. (p50) With the rise of financial capitalism, finance became an integrated system. It was centred in London for several reasons:

- England had huge savings from the high profits achieved by being early adopters of commercial and industrial capitalism
- England's highly unequal distribution of income meant that a small upper class had enormous control
- England's upper class was open to new sources of wealth (via marriage) and talent (recruiting from the lower classes)
- England's early merchant bankers had gained financial expertise during commercial and industrial capitalism

Family banking dynasties came to dominate. Rothschild especially, and others included Baring, Lazard, and Morgan. Being cosmopolitan rather than nationalistic, the Rothschilds used their influence in 1830 and 1840 to prevent European wars. These banking families valued secrecy so much that they remained unincorporated, preferring secrecy to limited liability. They incorporated only at the rise of inheritance taxes. (p52) International bankers were able to exert control by persuading business and government that short-sighted politicians could not be trusted with monetary policy. Bankers successfully made 2 claims:

1. That stable prices were needed. A gold standard (basing the value of money on gold) brought stable prices, because the amount of available gold in the world was relatively fixed.
2. That bankers should control the supply of money.

In fact, the gold standard has tended to be deflationary, because the economy has grown faster than the production of gold. Wars and gold strikes have reversed this tendency as follows:

- 1790–1817 Inflation due to French war, and few countries on the gold standard
- 1818–50 An extreme deflationary crisis upon the reestablishment of a high-content gold standard (1819) followed by a long period of deflation
- 1850–72 Inflation due to gold strikes and a series of wars
- 1872–97 An extreme deflationary crisis upon the reestablishment of a high-content gold standard (1873) followed by a long period of deflation
- 1897–1921 Inflation due to gold strikes and a series of wars
- 1921 An extreme deflationary crisis upon the reestablishment of a high-content gold standard

Central banks could control the supply of money by trading in government bonds. For example, by buying, they releases money into the economy. Since reserve requirements are a fraction of the money supply, a small change in reserves creates a large change in the money supply.

Governments could control the supply of money in several ways, including:

1. controlling the central bank (e.g. by changing reserve requirements, or the drastic impact of changing the money-value of gold)
2. taxation (deflationary)
3. spending (inflationary)

Up to 1931, international bankers could dominate industry, because industry depended on them for capital. Rothschild dominated many European railroads, while Morgan dominated many American railroads. Bankers could leverage their way onto boards of directors and create interlocking directorships. Quigley quotes German industrialist and politician Walter Rathenau, who was on dozens of boards, "Three hundred men, all of whom know one another, direct the economic destiny of Europe and choose their successors from among themselves." (p61)

International bankers could dominate governments during this period of financial capitalism (roughly 1850–1931) via governments' need for short-term as well as long-term loans. Quigley quotes Gladstone, Chancellor of the Exchequer, 1852: "government itself was not to be a substantive power in matters of Finance, but was to leave the Money Power supreme and unquestioned." Quigley quotes The Financial Times, 1921: "Half a dozen men at the top of the Big Five Banks could upset the whole fabric of government finance by refraining from renewing Treasury Bills."

Bankers could also influence governments by becoming advisors, taking advantage of government officials' ignorance in finance. Their advice was consistently good for bankers, bad for everyone else. Bankers could use their financial leverage to have their advice implemented. Quigley claims that Morgan dominated President Cleveland's 2nd term in this manner. (p62)

Bankers' influence peaked from 1919 to 1931. Since 1931, in most European countries, bankers were subordinate to either industrialists or government. This represents a shift from financial capitalism to monopoly capitalism. This shift happened earlier in Germany, and barely ever in France, largely explaining France's economic weakness in 1938–40. (p62)

===== International financial practices =====
When exchange rates are free to shift, an imbalance in international payments works itself out by a shift in exchange rates. When exchange rates are fixed by the gold standard, an imbalance in international payments works itself out by shifts in internal price levels (i.e. inflation or deflation). Fluctuating price levels (especially deflation) are bad for the economy, and so in 1929–36, countries went off the gold standard. (p65–66) A gold standard requires special conditions in order to function, and these conditions were disappearing by 1900 and largely gone after the economic changes brought about by World War I. (pp65–66) Quigley elaborates on this in the following section.

==== The situation before 1914 ====
Britain's island position and naval supremacy gave it security. It could avoid continental conflicts and focus its energies on industrial growth and world trade. (p67) Britain's dominance wasn't fully understood. For example, U.S. isolationism depended on Britain's control of the seas. Also, small nations could continue to exist because Britain's security allowed it to use balance-of-power tactics. Britain's dominance of industry and trade allowed it to dominate world finance and create a unified system necessary for a gold standard. Other requirements for a gold standard include free trade and free markets. All of these conditions were changing by 1890 and largely gone by 1919. (pp68–69)

=== The United States to 1917 ===
By 1900, U.S. development had shifted from frontier development to internal development. This brought a change in outlook, with less use for individualism and physical prowess, and more value on cooperation, training, intellect, standard of living, and leisure. (pp69–70)

The European occupation, creating the U.S., grew to become 3 main areas: A commercial (and later financial and industrial) East, a farming (and later industrial) West, and a farming South. The farming West (which used free labor) allied with the East to defeat the farming South (which used slave labour). Sectionalism became partisan: "The South refused to vote Republican until 1928, and the West refused to vote Democratic until 1932." (p70) Furthermore, European immigrants to the East became Democrats, to counter the East's older Republican families. These patterns were vital to national politics after 1880.

Mass enfranchisement after 1830 brought the rise of party machines. From 1840 to 1880, politicians needed support from 3 main sources: The electorate, the party machine (for the nomination and for patronage appointments), and campaign financiers. After 1865, the balance tipped in favour of the party machine, until reforms killed patronage in the 1880s, allowing financial and industrial interests to dominate U.S. politics from 1884 to 1933. (pp70–71)

Business interests were able to control the Republican Party: Since the South had no Republican movement to speak of, southern delegates to the Republican national convention could be bought by Northern interests, allowing them to dominate.

Western farmers, while rejecting the Democrats since the Civil War, rejected the Republicans also, because the Republican bankers' policy of deflation kept farm prices low, even as the cost of farm equipment rose. The West had local grassroots movements, and attempts at new parties, and not until 1896 did it accept the Democrats. Political unrest in this era (poor farmers, Wall Street barons, growing monopolies) could have been eased simply by increasing the money supply, but this was not in the interest of the financial capitalists who controlled U.S. finance.

Around this time, the U.S. found itself as a naval power: It defeated Spain to win Cuba, the Philippines etc. The economy flourished, with the help of inflation brought about by the Alaskan and South African gold strikes. U.S. power continued to expand, including taking over Hawaii and Panama (and building the Panama Canal), and intervening diplomatically in the Russo-Japanese War. (p75)

The Progressive movement developed out of the poor economy pre-1897. Some business leaders became less interested in money-making and more interested in helping others. This supported the growth of a liberal press, including The New Republic. The Progressive movement was also aided by a split in the business bloc between the financial capitalists (e.g. Morgan) and the monopoly capitalists (e.g. Rockefeller), allowing Woodrow Wilson to win the 1912 election with the support of Eastern liberals and Western farmers. (p76)

While the U.S. was absorbed in its own challenges, the First World War took it by surprise. (p76–77)

== The Russian Empire to 1917 ==
Russian civilization had three original sources: the Slavs, Viking invaders from the north, and Byzantine tradition from the south. (p81) Russia began to form on the western edge of thousands of miles of flatland. The middle band of the flatland is forest. North are bands of bush and tundra. South are bands of rich, arable soil and salty, inarable soil. The gradual drying of the eastern steppes over millennia has caused waves of migratory invasions westward, making the rich soil zone unsafe for sedentary farming peoples.

About 700 AD, Vikings developed trade routes down the rivers of Eastern Europe, seizing wealth from the peaceful Slavs and trading it in Byzantium. The Vikings' militaristic domination of the Slavs created a 2-class system which was still in existence at the writing of this book. The ruling class brought north many elements of Byzantine culture, including Orthodox Christianity, the alphabet, domed architecture, and the title Caesar (Czar). They also brought totalitarian autocracy, bringing all aspects of life under autocratic control. This totalitarian entity was called the polis in Classical Greece. In Russia it was modified by Viking militarism, by rule by power rather than by law, and by foreign ownership. (pp82–3)

Russia did not have the West's experience of a dark age, which had showed that people could live (and that law and culture could continue) without a state. This allowed the belief that the state should serve society, not vice versa, birthing Western liberalism. In Russia, laws were created by decree, while in the West, laws were founded by observation.

According to Quigley, Russia's version of Christianity also differed from the West's: The West retained the Semitic outlook that the world and the body had the potential for good, while Orthodox Christianity continued the Zoroastrian belief (via Plato) that matter was bad and ideas and spirit were good. (pp83–4)

In the West, it took centuries for the Christian belief that both the body and the mind were good to dominate the Aristotelian belief in the former and the Platonic belief in the latter. This inclusive outlook didn't develop in Orthodox Christianity, which continued to believe that the body was corrupt, and hope lay only in the spirit.

After 1500, Russia faced technological pressure from the industrializing West. Examples of this Western technology include firearms, agricultural techniques, sanitation, and the printing press. Having faced population pressure from the east for centuries (including the Mongol takeover), the Russian peasantry remained poor and were not able to afford firearms. In the West, guns were democratizing (anyone could afford them), but in the East guns supported autocracy (only the state could afford them). (pp86–7)

The Russian autocracy could only defend itself from the West by adopting Western technology, and it could only get resources to do this by draining wealth from the people. This centralization of wealth made Russia even more autocratic. (p87)

As pressure from the West decreased after 1730 (partially due to intra-European conflict), Russia was able to expand East.

In the 1800s, mass armies of armed soldiers invading from the West made it clear that Russia had to arm its citizenry. Periods of Russian reform (aided by upper class conscience and a desire to westernize) alternated with periods of reaction (out of upper class fear of losing privilege). (pp87–8)

The conscience-stricken Russian intelligentsia was originally pro-West, but was dissuaded by the West's Dickensian development. Many of the intelligentsia then turned with hope to the Russian peasantry. Not gaining their trust, and having no other base from which to mount reform, many turned to nihilism and anarchist assassination. Quigley relates these philosophies to traditional Orthodox hatred for the body. Neither method achieved its goals. (pp89–91)

About 1890, industrialization produced a Proletariat. The intelligentsia then had a social group to use as a basis for political reform. The arrival of Marxism gave it an ideology. The Russian outlook gradually modified Marxism, replacing rationalism with the use of force. (pp91–2)

By 1900, almost half of industrial capital was foreign-owned, and almost 3/4 of railroad capital was government-owned. Commodities needed by the Russian people (such as food and textiles) were exported to buy foreign industrial or luxury items for the ruling class. "This pattern of Russian economic organization continued under the Soviet regime". (pp92–3)

Railroads transformed the country: farming-for-sale become possible much farther from markets, opening up huge regions economically. Railroads allowed the autocracy to more efficiently take the country's wealth, making it even more autocratic. Russia became a more cohesive political unit, so that Japan allied with the U.S. to safeguard against Russia's strengthened east. (pp93–4)

As financial capitalism gave way to monopoly capitalism, managers limited output in order to increase profit. This economic slowdown spurred labour agitation in the period 1900–09, whereupon the full establishment of monopolies allowed for a resumption of higher economic growth. Monopolies were aided by tariffs: The free trade of 1857 was gone by 1891. (pp96–97)

Czar Nicholas II tried to combine civil repression (including pogroms and Russification) with economic growth and imperialism. In a sea of distrust, this failed, leading to the general strike of 1905. Stolypin, while cracking down on dissenters, attempted moderate reforms until 1910, when he returned to a strategy of Russification of minorities until he was killed by revolutionaries. The autocracy became less and less rational, eventually falling under the influence of the mystic Rasputin until his murder in 1916. (pp98–101)

All of this took place within an intellectual culture of irrational extremism, in which everyone had to have a belief (any belief) that they considered the absolute truth. (pp102–5)

== Conclusion ==
Referencing the title of the book, Quigley concludes that the tragedy of this period, including two world wars and the Great Depression, is obvious, and the hope being liberal imperialism of the West and the banking establishment. He is optimistic that Western civilization can once again develop along the traditional patterns of "inclusive diversity".

== See also ==
- Federal Reserve
- Monetary policy
