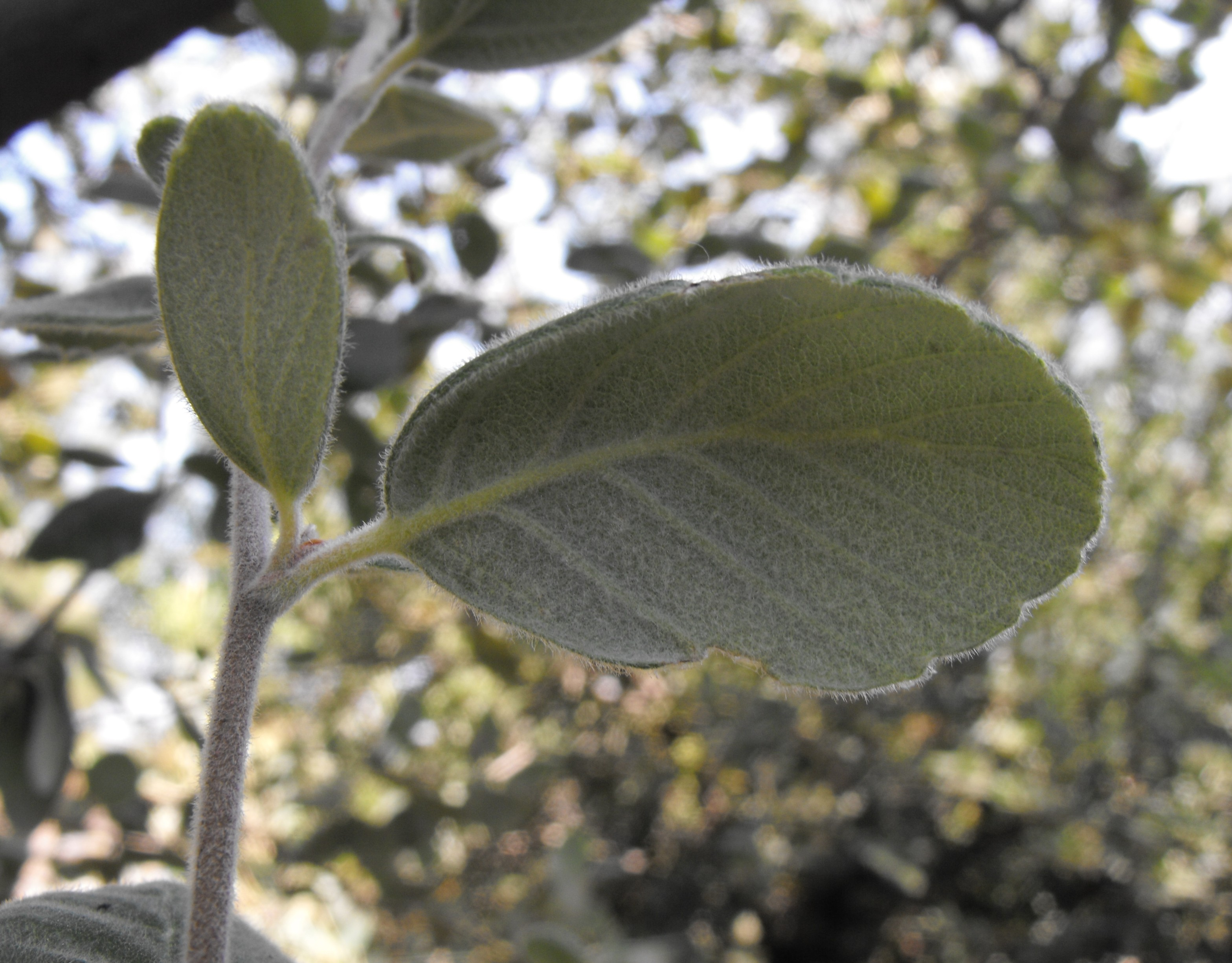

Conservation status
- Critically Endangered (IUCN 3.1)

- Endangered (ESA)

Scientific classification
- Kingdom: Plantae
- Clade: Embryophytes
- Clade: Tracheophytes
- Clade: Spermatophytes
- Clade: Angiosperms
- Clade: Eudicots
- Clade: Rosids
- Order: Rosales
- Family: Rosaceae
- Genus: Cercocarpus
- Species: C. traskiae

Binomial name
- Cercocarpus traskiae Eastw.
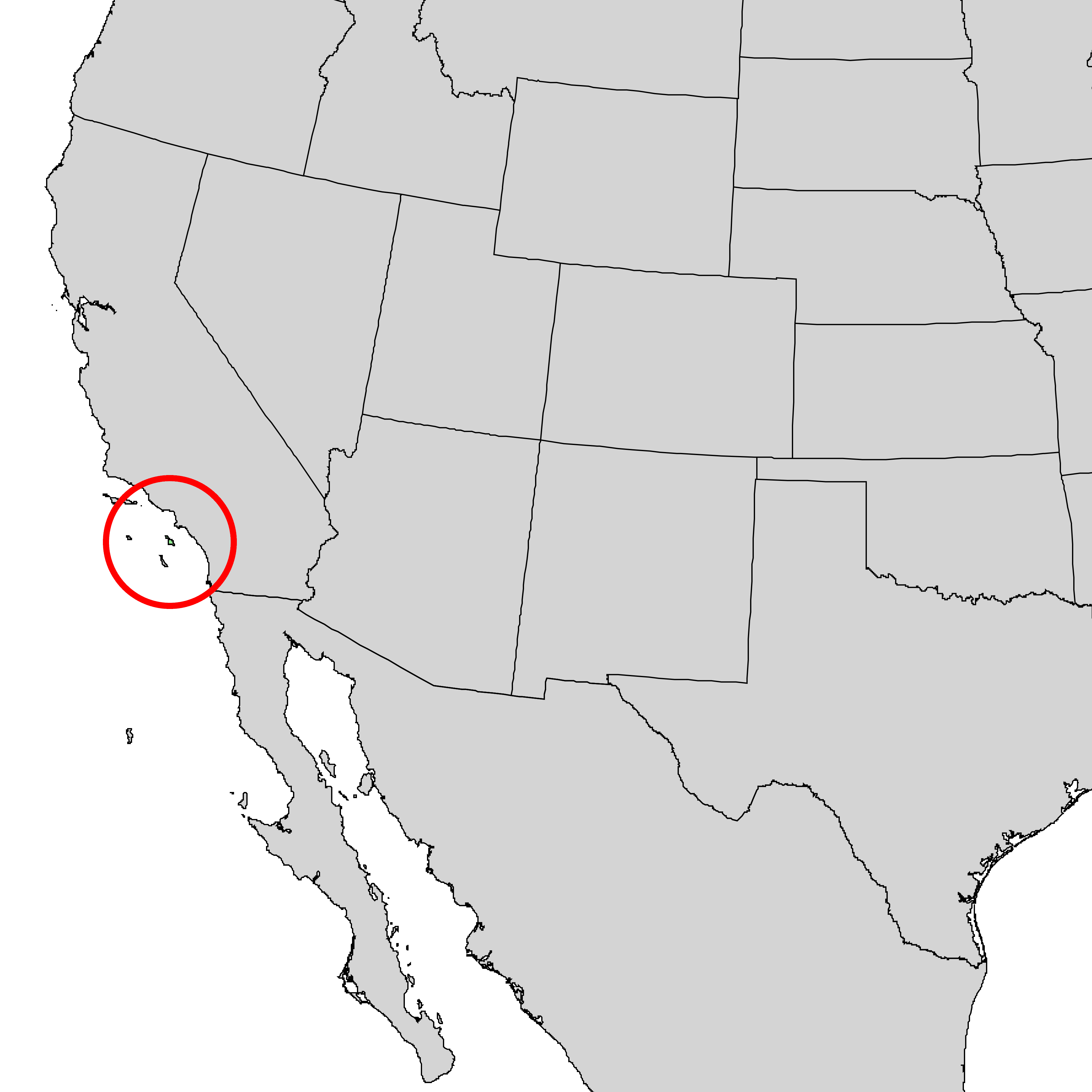
- Natural range of Cercocarpus traskiae

= Cercocarpus traskiae =

Santa Catalina Island mountain-mahogany

Species of tree

Cercocarpus traskiae, known by the common names Santa Catalina Island mountain-mahogany and Catalina mahogany, is a rare species of plant in the rose family.

== Distribution ==
It is endemic to Catalina Island, one of the southern Channel Islands in Los Angeles County, California. It is known from just a single population, found in Wild Boar Gully, an arroyo covered in coastal sage scrub on Catalina Island. The steep sides of the arroyo contain soils of saussurite gabbro.

It was rare at the time of its discovery by Blanche Trask in 1897 or 1898, when about 40 to 50 plants were counted.

When it was proposed for federal listing as an endangered species, in 1996, there were only six mature plants remaining. It has been called "one of the rarest shrubs in the continental United States" and "one of the rarest trees in North America."

== Description ==
Cercocarpus traskiae is a large shrub or tree that grows up to 8 meters (26 ft) in height. The leaves have thick, leathery oval blades with serrated edges and woolly-haired undersides. The leathery, woolly texture of the leaves distinguishes it from other Cercocarpus. The inflorescence is a cluster of up to 10 flowers which do not have petals. Plants do not always flower each year.

While there are sometimes many seedlings noted, the seedling survival rate and rate of recruitment are quite low. As of 2007, there are only seven adult trees capable of reproduction, all located in Wild Boar Gully, and most of these are very old.

== Conservation ==
The Catalina Island mountain mahogany is threatened by ungulates such as deer, and feral goats and pigs. Introduced goats have been removed from the island. Introduced mule deer remain on Catalina Island and may threaten the survival of the species. Fencing has been placed to prevent the remaining animals from touching the plants.

This rare species hybridizes with its relative, Cercocarpus betuloides, a situation that may lead to genetic swamping of the rare plant. This hybridization may be made more likely by the animals' disturbance of the habitat. Many of the seedlings and saplings growing today may be hybrids.

The population of pure Cercocarpus traskiae is not increasing and the species is entirely dependent on human intervention today.

== See also ==
- Chaparral
- California chaparral and woodlands
