= Delfina Cuero =

Delfina Cuero (ca 1900 – 1972) was a Native American writer of the Kumeyaay people.

The daughter of Vincente Cuero and Cidilda Quaha, she was born in Xamca (later known as Jamacha). The Kumeyaay people, whose traditional lands straddle the Mexican border, were displaced from the San Diego area by an influx of non-native settlers. Her family eventually moved to Baja California in Mexico. After her father abandoned his family, Cuero married Sebastian Osam because her mother said the family needed a man to provide food for them. The couple had five children who survived. Her husband died when their oldest child was eleven and Cuero was forced to provide for her family. She worked as a domestic worker for non-native people. When she tried to return to California during the 1960s, the United States government denied her access because she had no documentation to prove her place of birth. With the help of anthropologist Florence Connolly Shipek, she wrote an autobiography The Autobiography of Delfina Cuero that was published in 1968. The book helped document her California residency claim, and Cuero was allowed to return to southern California in 1967. She died there in 1972.

Her autobiography provides an important record of the history of Native Americans in southern California and the impact of westward expansion in the United States on people whose traditional homeland straddles the United States' border with Mexico. Jeff Smith describes Cuero's autobiography as "one of the most important and moving documents ever written about San Diego. It gives voice to the original inhabitants of the area and traces the slow erasure of their presence." The San Diego Archaeological Center has offered a "lecture and tour series [that] allows you to walk in the footsteps of Delfina Cuero," including visiting sites that are mentioned in her autobiography. Phillip Round, a Professor of English and Native American and Indigenous Studies, writes about the significance of Cuero's autobiography: "the Autobiography of Delfina Cuero is particularly useful to American Indian literary studies for the way it enriches our understanding of narrated Indian texts by introducing borderlands theory and the discourse of immigration into the critical debate over the nation of these 'as-told-to' works" (p. 172).
