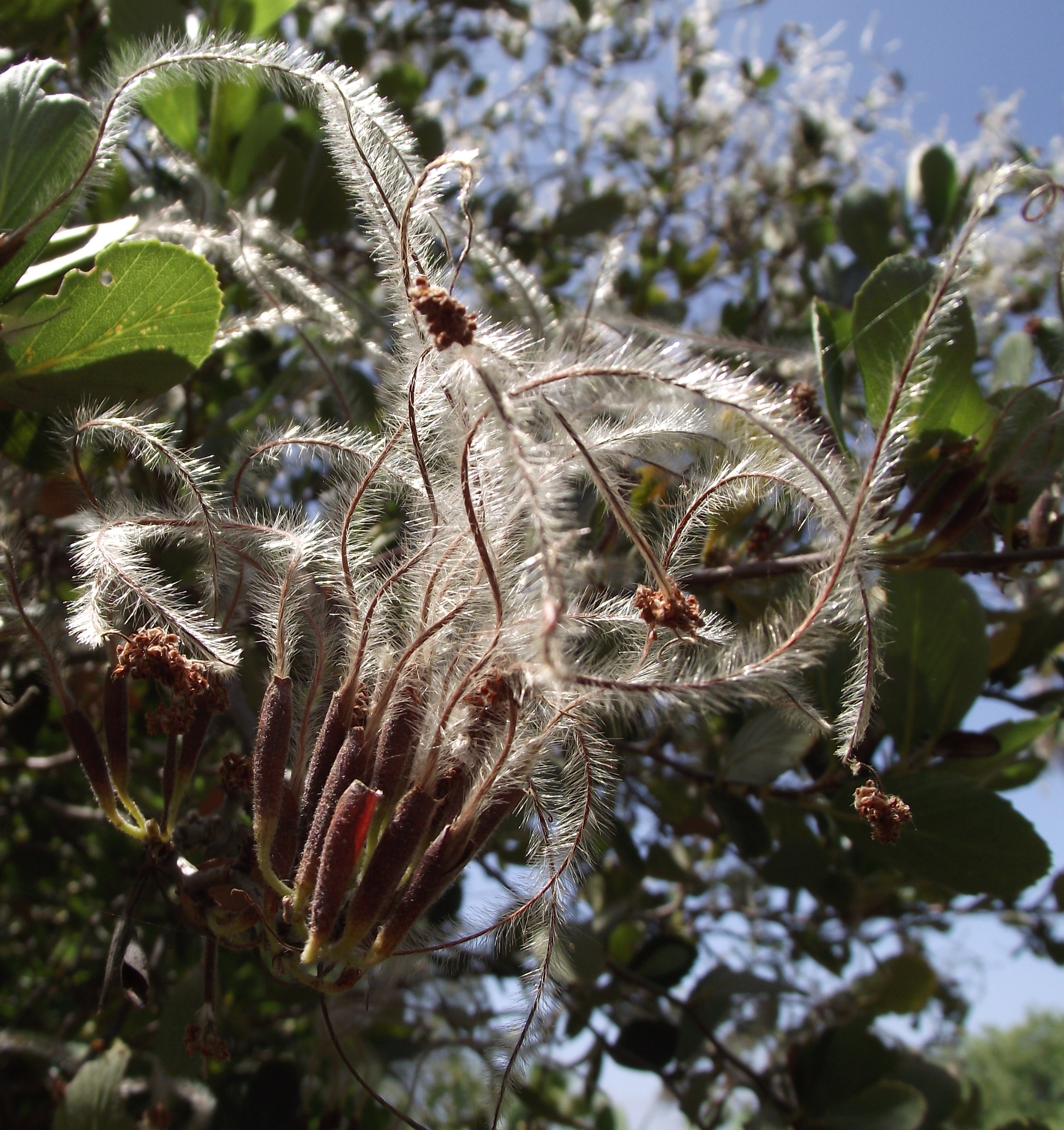
- Cercocarpus betuloides var. blancheae in fruit

Conservation status
- Unranked (NatureServe)

Scientific classification
- Kingdom: Plantae
- Clade: Tracheophytes
- Clade: Angiosperms
- Clade: Eudicots
- Clade: Rosids
- Order: Rosales
- Family: Rosaceae
- Genus: Cercocarpus
- Species: C. betuloides

Binomial name
- Cercocarpus betuloides Nutt.
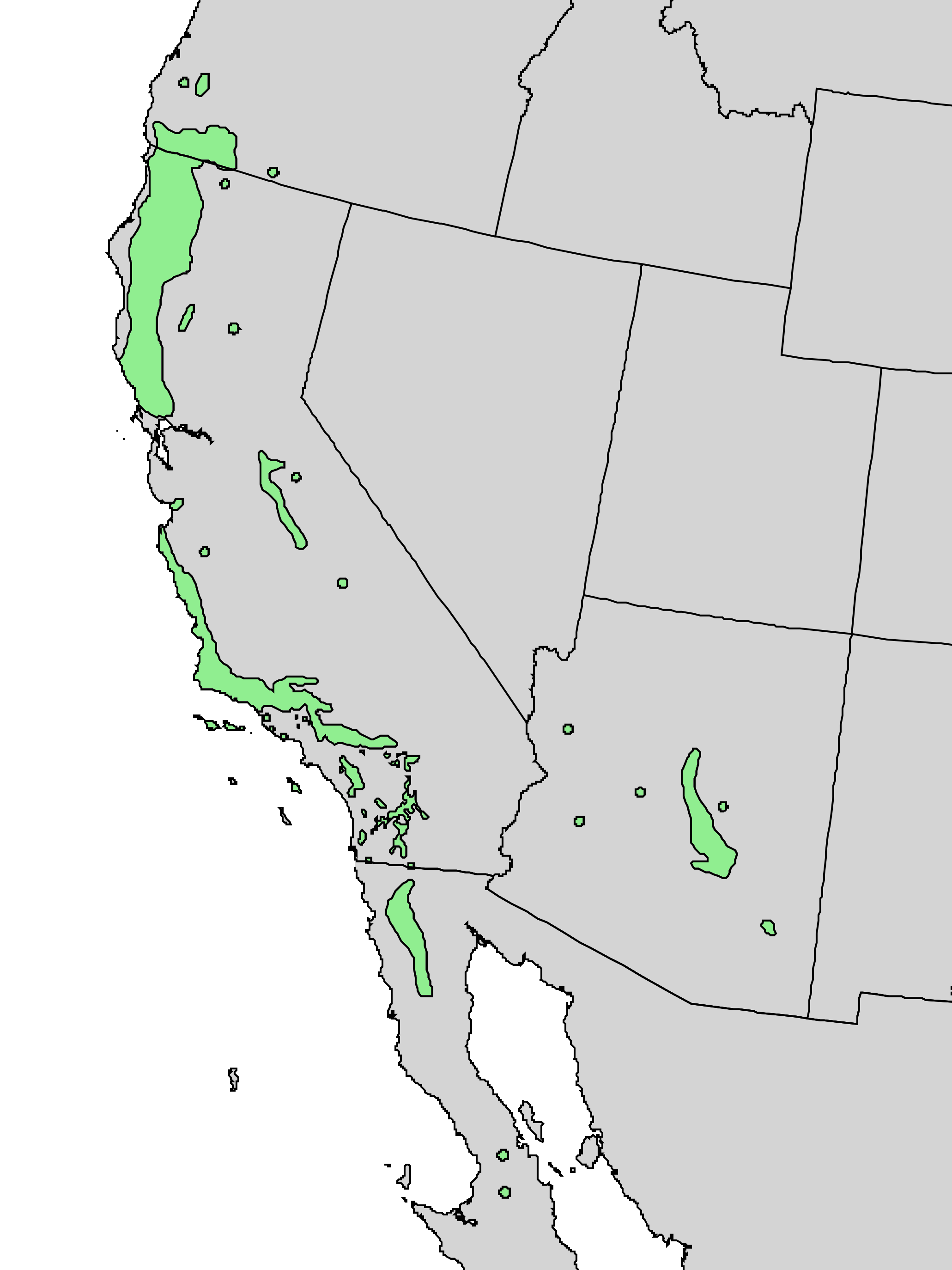
- Natural range of Cercocarpus betuloides

Synonyms
- Cercocarpus montanus var. glaber (S. Watson) F.L. Martin

= Cercocarpus betuloides =

Mountain mahogany

Species of tree

Cercocarpus betuloides, commonly known as birch-leaf mountain mahogany or western mountain mahogany, is a species of flowering shrub or small tree in the rose family (Rosaceae). It is native to California and Baja California. It is one of at least nine species in the broader mountain mahogany genus, Cercocarpus, characterized by their extremely hard reddish-brown wood and distinctive feathery seeds, although the genus is not a true mahogany.

== Description ==
=== Growth pattern ===
Cercocarpus betuloides is a shrub or small tree growing from 1 to 5 meters (3 to 16 ft), rarely to 8 m (26 ft). Its branches are incised and muscular in appearance from the side. In cross section they appear lobed.

Common shrub associates within the chaparral community include toyon.

=== Leaves and stems ===
The leaves are distinctive in that they have smooth edges from the base to about halfway up, then are wavy or toothed to the rounded tip.

=== Inflorescence and fruit ===
The white flowers are small, clustered, and mildly scented, similar to Acacia.

The fruit is a tubular achene with the long, plumelike flower style still attached.

== Etymology ==
The genus name, Cercocarpus, comes from the Greek kerkos (tail), referring to the tail-like appearance of the fruit; and karpos (fruit) thus "fruit with tail", referring to the long feathery styles that persist on the seeds.

The specific species name, betuloides, comes from the latin betula (birch); and the Greek suffix -oeidēs (resembling or having the form of) thus "betula-like" or "resembling a birch", referring to the birch-like leaves.

== Taxonomy ==
There are several varieties:

- Cercocarpus betuloides var. betuloides, rangewide
- Cercocarpus betuloides var. blancheae — Island mountain mahogany, limited to California, especially the Channel Islands
- Cercocarpus betuloides var. macrourus — few flowered mountain mahogany, California and Oregon
- Cercocarpus betuloides var. traskiae (often treated as a separate species, Cercocarpus traskiae Eastw.) — Catalina Island mountain mahogany, one of the rarest critically endangered trees in the world with only seven mature trees in existence in 1990.

Cercocarpus betuloides is sometimes treated as a part of Cercocarpus montanus, var. glaber in particular.

== Distribution and habitat ==
The plant is native to California, Baja California, Oregon, Arizona, and northwestern New Mexico. It typically grows in summer dry areas of the foothills and mountains of California, often in chaparral.

== Ecology ==
Deer, cattle and sheep browse the plant.

== Uses ==
The reddish wood of the shrub is very hard and was traditionally used by the indigenous peoples of California to make arrow tips, fishing spears, and digging sticks.

Cercocarpus betuloides is cultivated as an ornamental plant by specialty nurseries for planting in native plant, drought tolerant, and wildlife gardens; and in designed natural landscaping projects and habitat restoration programs.
