= Seeds of Destruction (book) =

2007 book by F. William Engdahl

Seeds of Destruction: Hidden Agenda of Genetic Manipulation
- Book cover
- Author: F. William Engdahl
- Language: English
- Publisher: Global Research
- Publication date: 20 November 2007
- Publication place: United States
- Pages: 341
- ISBN: 9780973714722

Seeds of Destruction: Hidden Agenda of Genetic Manipulation is a book by F. William Engdahl, an American writer and journalist living in Germany. The book claims that the wealthy Rockefeller family is planning to take control of the world's agriculture and food supply through the Green Revolution and the promotion of genetically modified organisms which would lead to the elimination of independent farms.

== Content ==
In this book Engdahl presents a conspiracy theory centred around the idea that current descents of the Rockefeller family have developed a plan to take control of the global agricultural system.

Engdahl claims that this plot is supported by many world leaders, as well as international organizations such as the International Monetary Fund (IMF), the World Bank, and the World Trade Organization (WTO).

== See also ==
- Genetic pollution
