= Florence Connolly Shipek =

Florence C. Shipek (December 11, 1918 – January 9, 2003) professor of anthropology at the University of Wisconsin-Parkside, was an American anthropologist and ethnohistorian, a leading authority on Southern California Indians.

== Biography ==
Florence McKeever Connolly was born in North Adams, Massachusetts on December 11, 1918. She started her college years at College of Charleston at the age of 15, and then earned her BA (1938) and MA (1940) in anthropology at the University of Arizona. There, she served as field assistant to Clara Lee Tanner and Emil Haury in 1935 and 1939-1940, and published on petroglyphs and ceramics based on that field work.

== Contributions ==
During World War II, she went to work first at the District Intelligence Office in Seattle and then at the Labor Board. After the war, in 1944 she was an instructor of geology at the University of Washington. When her husband Carl joined the faculty at Scripps Institute of Oceanography in San Diego, Shipek volunteered at the San Diego Museum of Man and published on pottery.

In 1954, Dorothy Friend invited her to learn about and help local tribes in San Diego with the problems they were having following the passage of Public Law 280 in 1953. This law had transferred authority from the Bureau of Indian Affairs (BIA) to state governments in California, as well as in four other states. The result was shutting down all services on reservations, including medical, welfare, and Federal policing. This began her long career as an unpaid researcher who was also consulted by Congress.

Following the death of her husband in 1969, she went to Hawaii in 1970 and received her PhD in ethnohistory in 1977 from the University of Hawaii. There she was friends with fellow anthropologist Ann Dunham, the mother of Barack Obama. While working on her PhD she served as Director of Title II Community Development Program for University of San Diego. In 1975-76, she was a Lecturer in American Indian Studies at California State University-Northridge. From 1978 until retirement, Shipek was a professor of anthropology at the University of Wisconsin-Parkside.

== Honors and awards ==
Shipek was the first recipient of the Rupert Costo Chair in American Indian History at the University California-Riverside where she served from 1987-1988. She was elected a Fellow of the Historical Society of Southern California in 1992. In 2002, she received the San Diego Save Our Heritage Organization 2002 “People in Preservation” Lifetime Achievement award for her work on Southern California tribes. She was also a long term, active member of the Congress of History of San Diego and Imperial Counties.

== Research emphasis ==
Shipek was “the expert witness for Southern California Indians who … “never lost a case in court for the Indians and was feared by the Feds because she put together bullet proof cases”. In her 1987 book, Pushed into the Rocks, she published the information from which she researched enrollment issues for the San Pasqual band, the problem with identity of the Kamia tribe for the Mission Indians Land Claims case, the San Luis Rey River reservation section of Rincon Band of Mission Indians and La Jolla Band of Mission Indians v. Escondido Mutual Water Company and Vista Irrigation District water case, and the human consequences of Public Law 280. The Autobiography of Delfina Cuero as Told to Florence Shipek, first published in 1968, was expanded into the 1991 edition that has become the definitive textbook used by Anthropology and Women’s Studies professors around the U.S. to elucidate the stressful and tough existence of Indian people once the Americans took over.

Because of her meticulous research and personal traits such as generosity and encouraging Indian education, to Indian people in Southern California, Shipek was a venerated elder. Following her death on January 9, 2003, the Kumeyaay Nation hosted a traditional Native American all-night long wake to remember and honor her.

== Bibliography ==
- Shipek, Florence. Pushed into the Rocks. Univ. Nebraska, Lincoln, 1987, 230 pp., ISBN 9780965247054
- Shipek, FC. Delfina Cuero, Her Autobiography and Account of her Last Years and Her Ethnobotanic Contributions. Ballena Press, Menlo Park, 1991, 98 pp. (first published by Dawson’s Book Shop, Los Angeles, 1968, 67 p.), ISBN 9780879191221
- Shipek, FC. Lower California Frontier: Articles from the San Diego Union 1870. Dawson's Book Shop, 1965. ASIN=B000J9Y51A

== Papers ==
- Bean, LJ, and Shipek, FC. Luiseno, in Sturtevant, WC, and Heizer, RF, eds., Handbook of North American Indians, California, 1978.
- Shipek, FC. Kumeyaay Socio-Political Structure. Jour. Calif. and Great Basin Anthropology, 4(2), 1982, p. 296-303.
- Shipek, FC. California Indian burial sites: Two recent legal cases: religious freedom, excavation and reburial. Applied Anthropology Documentation Project, 1982, ASIN=B0007B5HXC
- Shipek, FC. California Indian reaction to the Franciscans. The Americas, 41.4, 1984–85, p. 480-493.
