= F. William Engdahl =

American writer (born 1944)

Frederick William Engdahl
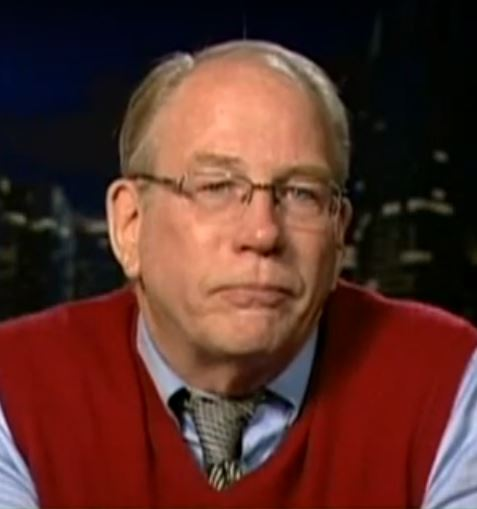
- Born: August 9, 1944 (age 82); Minneapolis, Minnesota, United States
- Occupation: Writer
- Website: williamengdahl.com

Frederick William Engdahl (born August 9, 1944) is an American writer based in Germany. He identifies himself as an "economic researcher, historian and freelance journalist." He is known for his views that the September 11 attacks, the Arab Spring and the theory of global warming are all conspiracies. He has written extensively for the LaRouche movement, Russia Today and GlobalResearch.

== Early life and education ==
Born in Minneapolis, Minnesota, United States, Engdahl is the son of F. William Engdahl Sr., and Ruth Aalund (b. Rishoff). Engdahl grew up in Texas and earned a degree in politics from Princeton University in 1966 (BA) followed by graduate study in comparative economics at the Stockholm University from 1969 to 1970. He then worked as an economist and freelance journalist in New York and in Europe.

== Career ==
Engdahl began writing about oil politics with the first oil shock in the early 1970s. He has also been a long-time associate of the LaRouche movement and served as an economics editor for LaRouche's Executive Intelligence Review.

His first book, entitled A Century of War: Anglo-American Oil Politics and the New World Order, discusses the alleged roles of Zbigniew Brzezinski and George Ball and of the USA in the 1979 overthrow of the Shah of Iran, which was meant to manipulate oil prices and to stop Soviet expansion. Engdahl says that Brzezinski and Ball used the Islamic Balkanization model proposed by Bernard Lewis. In 2007, he completed Seeds of Destruction: The Hidden Agenda of Genetic Manipulation, in which he criticized Monsanto's strategy with GMO seeds, such as Roundup Ready soybeans. He has also written for newsmagazines such as the Asia Times.

Engdahl is a contributor to the Global Research website of the conspiracist Centre for Research on Globalization, the Russian website New Eastern Outlook, and Veterans Today (on whose advisory board he sits). He is a regular contributor to RT (formerly Russia Today) and Voice of Russia. He is on the scientific committee of the magazines Geopolitica, and the far-right journal Eurasia, alongside Aleksandr Dugin and others. He was a keynote speaker at the conference "Geopolitics of Multipolarity", held at Moscow State University in 2011, alongside Dugin.

== Personal life ==
William Engdahl has been married since 1987 and has been living for more than two decades near Frankfurt am Main, Germany.

== Beliefs ==
=== George Soros conspiracies and color revolutions ===
Engdahl has written of the alleged secret power of Jewish financiers such as George Soros and the Rothschilds. Author Michael Wohlraich describes Engdahl as the first US populariser of Soros conspiracy theories, noting that he wrote in the Executive Intelligence Review in 1996 that "The most important of such 'Jews who are not Jews,' are the Rothschilds, who launched Soros’s career. Soros is American only in his passport." This has been described by the anti-fascist group Unicorn Riot as "an example of the anti-Semitic "rootless cosmopolitan" trope. Similarly, historian Ivan Kalmar writes that it is "not clear where the Soros Myth began... A likely candidate for the dubious honour of originating it is the Executive Intelligence Review (EIR)... An article [written by Engdahl] in the 1 November 1996 edition accuses the financier of manipulating the world’s finances in partnership with the Rothschilds, who ‘launched Soros’s career’".

In 2008, Engdahl alleged in GlobalResearch that the 2008 Tibetan uprising against Chinese rule was engineered by the Soros family and US government - "the American government, specifically the US State Department, the National Endowment for Democracy (NED), the ‘CIA's Freedom House’ and the Trace Foundation, run by Andrea Soros Colombel, daughter of the financier George Soros, orchestrated an ‘ultra-high risk geopolitical game with Beijing by fanning the flames of violence in Tibet’ through Tibetan NGOs in exile" - an analysis taken up by Chinese media but derided as "‘insinuations’ and ‘simplistic arguments based on “guilt by association”'" by Tibet expert Tsering Shakya. Engdahl also alleged that the Euromaidan uprising in Ukraine was the well-orchestrated work of a US-funded organization with its origins in Belgrade.

=== Abiogenic petroleum ===
Engdahl stated in 2007 that he had come to believe that petroleum is of geological origin, a view contrary to the scientific understanding that it is of biological origin. He believes oil to be produced from carbon, by forces of heat and pressure deep underground. Engdahl calls himself an "ex peak oil believer", stating that peak oil is actually a political phenomenon known as petrodollar warfare.

=== Scepticism of global warming ===
Engdahl argued in 2009 that the problem of global warming is much exaggerated. He claims that global warming is merely a "scare" and a "thinly veiled attempt to misuse climate to argue for a new Malthusian reduction of living standards for the majority of the world while a tiny elite gains more power."

=== Bill Gates/vaccine conspiracy theories ===
A 2010 article by Engdahl, published by websites including Prison Planet and Voltaire Network and later cited by Robert F. Kennedy Jr. and Alex Jones, was key to the spread of conspiracy theories about Bill Gates promoting vaccines as part of a secret programme to control population: "it avers that Gates, Buffett, and Turner are driving a ‘Global Eugenics agenda,’ while Gates himself ‘expects vaccines to be used to reduce population growth.’"

=== Greater Middle East Project theories ===
According to Engdahl in 2014, the ultimate goal of the US is to take the resources of Africa and Middle East under military control to block economic growth in China and Russia.

=== Turkey and the CIA role in global politics ===
Engdahl believes that the CIA is behind several historical revolutions, including the overthrow of the Shah of Iran in 1979 and the 2011 Egyptian revolution. In 2016 an article by Engdahl circulated widely in Turkey which alleged that the 2016 Turkish coup d'état attempt was engineered by Zbigniew Brzezinski, based on an article in by Brzezinki supposedly published in The National Interest but in fact fabricated by Engdahl. Al-Monitor described how in August 2016 Engdahl told a right-wing Russian think tank that "Former vice chairman of the National Intelligence Council of the CIA, Graham E. Fuller, was on Princes' Islands, 20 minutes from Istanbul, the entire night of the coup, monitoring developments until the coup collapsed" - when in fact Fuller was in Washington. Al-Monitor describe Engdahl's intervention as part of a collaborative Russian-Turkish disinformation campaign.

== Selected publications ==
- A Classical KGB Disinformation Campaign: Who Killed Olof Palme?, with Goran Haglund, William Jones, and Paolo Serri. EIR Special Report (1986).
- A Century of War: Anglo-American Oil Politics and the New World Order. London: Pluto (2004), revised ed. ISBN 074532309X; Progressive Press (2012). ISBN 1615774920.
- Seeds of Destruction. The Hidden Agenda of Genetic Manipulation. Centre for Research on Globalization (2007). ISBN 0973714727.
- Full Spectrum Dominance: Totalitarian Democracy in the New World Order. Boxboro, Mass.: Third Millennium Press (2009). ISBN 978-0979560866; Progressive Press (2011). ISBN 1615776540.
- Gods of Money: Wall Street and the Death of the American Century. Wiesbaden: edition.engdahl (2010). ISBN 978-3981326314; Progressive Press (2011). ISBN 1615778055.
- Myths, Lies and Oil Wars. Wiesbaden: edition.engdahl (2012). ISBN 978-3981326369.
- Target: China -- How Washington and Wall Street Plan to Cage the Asian Dragon. San Diego, Calif.: Progressive Press (2014). German and Chinese editions (2013).
- The Lost Hegemon: Whom the Gods Would Destroy. Wiesbaden: mine.books (2016).
- Manifest Destiny: Democracy as Cognitive Dissonance. Wiesbaden: mine.books (2018). ISBN 978-3981723731.
