= Glenn Beck Radio Program =

The Glenn Beck Radio Program
- Title card for the Glenn Beck Radio Program on television
- Genre: Conservative talk radio
- Running time: Weekdays: 3 hours (ET) (9:00 am – 12:00 pm)
- Country of origin: United States
- Home station: WFLA (Radio, 2000–present)
- Syndicates: WPHT (Radio, 2002–2011); Premiere Networks (Radio via syndication, 2002–present); WOR (Radio, 2006–2011); TheBlaze Radio Network (Radio, 2013–present)
- TV adaptations: Glenn Beck Program (2006–present)
- Starring: Glenn Beck; Stu Burguiere; (formerly)
- Recording studio: Mercury Studios, Irving, Texas
- Original release: January 2000
- Website: www.glennbeck.com
- Podcast: https://www.glennbeck.com/st/the_glenn_beck_podcast

The Glenn Beck Radio Program is an American conservative talk radio show, hosted by commentator Glenn Beck on over 400 radio stations across America, his company's own TheBlaze Radio Network, with a live television simulcast weekdays on TheBlaze TV. Since its inception as a nationally syndicated show in 2002, the program has become one of the highest rated radio programs. Furthermore, it led to television shows on CNN and the Fox News Channel, six New York Times bestselling books (five of which debuted at No. 1), a magazine, and a stage tour. In 2009, many editorials, such as those on The Huffington Post, singled out Glenn Beck's radio and television programs for raising issues which led to the resignation of Obama advisor Van Jones.

== History ==
In 2000, The Glenn Beck Program began airing on WFLA (AM) 970 in Tampa, Florida. He inherited the 18th-placed position at WFLA and quickly gained popularity in its afternoon slot. Within one year of doing his first talk show in afternoon drive at WFLA, Beck gave the station its first No. 1 program ever. Due to the overwhelming demand for live, news oriented programming after September 11, 2001, Beck was offered a jump start on national syndication. Premiere Radio Networks launched Beck into syndication on January 2, 2002, having already added other affiliates such as KPRC in Houston and WGST in Atlanta. On January 14, 2002, WPHT in Philadelphia became the flagship station.

Beck ran a series of rallies called "Glenn Beck's Rally for America" during 2003, in support of the troops fighting the Iraq War. While generally attended by war supporters, Beck spoke of many who "disagreed with the war, but still supported the troops". He ran the final rally at Marshall University, over the Memorial Day weekend. The event drew about 25,000 people.

2005 marked a year of substantial ratings growth. The program ended the year being heard on more than 200 stations, and was the third highest-rated national radio talk show among adults ages 25 to 54, according to Premiere Research/Arbitron. On January 17, 2006, Beck began a new television show at CNN Headline News. To accommodate the new show, Beck relocated his studios to Radio City Music Hall in New York City. Until January 2011, Beck's flagship station in New York City was WOR.

The show added its 300th affiliate in 2008. Its 400th affiliate, KRLA in Los Angeles, was added in June 2010.

On October 16, 2008, Beck announced that he had signed a "multi-year deal" that would put him in the popular 5 p.m. (Eastern) time slot on the Fox News Channel. He decided not to renew his contract with CNN, instead taking a deal from Fox because he felt Fox would give him permission to voice his opinions.

After his dismissal from Fox News, Bill O'Reilly joined the show as a contributor, appearing every Friday or whenever certain news warrants.

== Format ==
Combining elements of the comedy-centric hot talk format and more traditional talk-radio shows, like Rush Limbaugh, and Sean Hannity, the Program consists of humor, political commentary, discussions about current events popular culture and personal reflections from the host.

The first half of each hour of the show is usually a monologue by Beck, but occasionally will include a guest or some conversation with the production staff. During the second half of each hour, Beck takes callers and continues discussing the themes he has previously introduced. Promotions for companies like "My Patriot Supply" and "ZipRecruiter" are common during certain moments of the show even if there are no commercial breaks.

The show also features two contributing co-hosts, Steve "Stu" Burguiere and Pat Gray, and the Producer, Jeff "Jeffy" Fisher, also contributes to the content.

In January 2010, Beck changed his show's theme music to a rock anthem with sampled voices overlaid. The music was performed by Anthony Newett, the vocals by Stephen Lyons and the lyrics written by Beck and Burguiere. Lyrics included the refrain, "We must remember who we are, we will be the key."

In January 2011, the show's theme music changed again to a song that was similar to the 2010 version. In January 2013, the theme music became a heavier rock background, and the lyrics changed to: "Turn it up! Turn it on, let's go! Turn it up! It's Glenn Beck on the radio!" In 2016, the theme song became "We Are One", sung by David Osmond and American Idol contestant Jenn Blosil.

In September 2017, "We Are One" was retired in favor of a new theme song – a simple acoustic guitar tune and a female voice saying "Love. Courage. Truth. This is The Glenn Beck Program".

== Reception ==
Beck's on-air persona has been described as a "mix of moral lessons, outrage and an apocalyptic view of the future … capturing the feelings of an alienated class of Americans." Beck has referred to himself as an entertainer, and a rodeo clown. Additionally, Beck has identified himself with Howard Beale, the fictional news anchor portrayed by Peter Finch in the 1976 film Network, who, in a moment of indignation and fury, urges his viewers to declare "I'm as mad as hell, and I'm not going to take this anymore!" Says Beck, "When [Beale] came out of the rain and he was like, none of this makes any sense. I am that guy."

Beck's style of expressing his candid opinions have helped make his shows successful, but have also resulted in protest. On November 14, 2006, Beck asked then-newly elected Minnesota Congressman Keith Ellison, the first Muslim elected to Congress, to "prove to me that you are not working with our enemies" and saying "And I know you're not. I'm not accusing you of being an enemy, but that's the way I feel, and I think a lot of Americans will feel that way." Beck later regretted the question, saying it was "quite possibly the poorest-worded question of all time" and joked about his "lack of intelligence". While Ellison stated he was not offended by the question, it later spurred several Arab-American organizations, such as the Arab Institute and the Muslim Public Affairs Council, to publicly protest Beck's hiring as a commentator by Good Morning America, accusing Beck of "anti-Muslim and anti-Arab prejudice".

== Ratings ==
According to Talkers Magazine, Beck's program was the third most-listened-to radio program in the United States in 2009. In comparison, his television show on Fox News Channel peaked in ratings in 2009 at 3.4 million views, but had dropped to a third in 2010, before he left to create his own network.

== Substitute hosts ==
Notable substitute hosts for Beck have included:

- Ben Shapiro, political commentator and lawyer
- Chris Baker, host of the morning show on 100.3 KTLK FM in Minneapolis, Minnesota
- Bob Lonsberry, host of a conservative radio show on WHAM AM 1180 in Rochester, NY and WSYR-AM 570 (3–6 PM), Syracuse, NY.
- Joe Pags, host of News Radio 1200 WOAI in San Antonio.
- Mike McConnell, midday host at WLW in Cincinnati and host of the syndicated The Weekend.
- Denny Schaffer, midday talk show host at WCWA in Toledo
- Steve "Stu" Burguiere, executive producer and head writer for the Glenn Beck Program
- Pat Gray, Beck's friend and co-host of the Glenn Beck Program.
- Doc Thompson, host of the morning show on TheBlaze radio.

== Affiliates ==
The Glenn Beck Radio Program is syndicated to over 400 radio stations throughout the United States, as well as on SiriusXM's Triumph channel 111.
