= Steve Burguiere =

American conservative talk show host

Stu Burguiere
- Born: February 9, 1976 (age 50); Tarrytown, New York
- Occupations: Radio Host, TV Host
- Years active: 1997–present
- Movement: Conservatism
- Spouse: Lisa Paige Burguiere (2002-present)

Steve Burguiere, known better as "Stu" (born February 9, 1976), is an American radio producer and personality, executive producer of The Glenn Beck Program and host of Stu Does America on Blaze TV. Burguiere previously hosted The Wonderful World of Stu, which ran until 2020.

== Early and personal life ==
Burguiere was born in Tarrytown, New York, and grew up in the state of Connecticut. He became an intern at the New Haven radio station KC101. He started in the promotions department, working his way up to producer of the Glenn Beck Morning Show. He also did voice-over work and recorded commercials for the Metabolife company. While working at KC101, Burguiere met his future wife, Lisa Paige.

== Career ==
Glenn Beck left KC101 to work in talk radio at WFLA in Tampa. Soon after, Burguiere took his job as co-host of the morning show with Vinnie Penn. After a year, he moved to Tampa to produce the Glenn Beck Program, and host The Stu Show Saturdays on WFLA. Burguiere added bits to the Glenn Beck Program, posing as callers such as the Obama advisor "Honkey Whitesville", a parody of real-life Obama advisor Jason Furman and "Wilfred from Sun City, Florida". Stu generally provided a friendly and calmer counterpoint to Beck. Burguiere and fellow producer Dan Andros and personality Pat Gray hosted after-show shows on Beck's "Insider" audio stream. Burguiere also fills in as host for Beck as needed.

Burguiere co-hosted Pat & Stu with Pat Gray, a 2-hour program airing on TheBlaze weekdays at 12:00 Noon ET. He was also the host of The Wonderful World of Stu, which aired Friday at 8:00 PM ET. In February 2020, he started hosting a comedy/news program, Stu Does America, on Blaze TV, Blaze Radio and podcasts.
