= Arguing with Idiots =

Book by Glenn Beck

Arguing with Idiots: How to Stop Small Minds and Big Government
- Author: Glenn Beck
- Illustrator: Paul E. Nunn
- Language: English
- Subject: US Politics
- Genre: Political Non-fiction
- Publisher: Simon & Schuster
- Publication date: September 2009
- Publication place: United States
- Pages: 326
- ISBN: 978-1-4165-9501-4
- OCLC: 429915131
- LC Class: E169.12 .B334 2009

Arguing with Idiots: How to Stop Small Minds and Big Government is a book written by conservative syndicated radio talk show host Glenn Beck, in collaboration with his company, Mercury Radio Arts, published in 2009 by Simon & Schuster.

The book is formatted as a series of responses by Beck, dressed up in a variation of an outfit worn by the United States' Founding Fathers, to statements made by the "Idiot", played by Beck, apparently dressed in a parody of a military uniform, consisting of a modified Bundeswehr tunic and Soviet visor cap, with an example picture on the front cover. (Note: The uniform in the cover photo has been described in various ways, including "East German military uniform", "Soviet-style commissar's uniform", and "soviet kitschy uniform". Beck doesn't specify what sort of uniform it is, but refers to the character dressed in it as "our Idiot Friend".) On the back cover are a few of the negative criticisms Beck has accumulated.

Among the issues Beck discusses are progressivism in the United States, capitalism, the Second Amendment, as well as education, energy in America, labor unions, illegal immigration, the "nanny state", owning a home, economics, American presidents, universal health care, and the U.S. Constitution.

== Reception ==
Arguing with Idiots took the No. 1 spot on The New York Times's Non-fiction Best Seller list within the first week of release.

A review by Christopher Michel in the Brooklyn Rail allows that the book is "readable and fun (sort of)" with "easily findable facts and opinions", but asserts that "if the book's goal is to convince liberals of the validity of the 'truth' according to Beck, it is a dismal failure. The title starts with an insult and the barbs continue inside . . ." According to Michel, Beck's "attempt to shut down contact between liberals and conservatives by encouraging his fans to demean anyone who disagrees with him is saddening and dangerous." However, in the introduction of the book, Beck says, in a sort of disclaimer, that "The Idiot" could mean "a political activist with an agenda bigger than a brain" or "a well intentioned person who's just a little misinformed" and "sometimes the idiot is, well, me."

The liberal advocacy group Media Matters and MSNBC host Keith Olbermann criticized the book for misconstruing and applauding Article I, Section 9, Clause 1 of the Constitution which effectively prohibited Congress from banning the importation of slaves until 1808 while allowing a tax not to exceed 10 dollars on "each person" imported. Beck had written that "the Founders actually put a price tag on coming to this country: $10 per person. Apparently they felt like there was a value to being able to live here. Not anymore. These days we can’t ask anything of immigrants — including that they abide by our laws." Later in the book, Beck called the slave trade horrendous and described how the clause protected and extended the practice.
