= The Immortal Nicholas =

2015 novel by Glenn Beck

- Author: Glenn Beck
- Language: English
- Genre: Fantasy
- Publisher: Mercury Radio Arts
- Publication date: October 27, 2015
- Publication place: United States
- Pages: 336
- ISBN: 978-1476798844

The Immortal Nicholas is an adventure/action/fantasy novel by Glenn Beck, published on October 27, 2015, by Mercury Radio Arts and Simon & Schuster. Upon its first week of release it was listed on the Amazon.com "Best Sellers" list. Beck, a New York Times bestselling author and founder of TheBlaze and Mercury Radio Arts, said on his website that he'd "realized years ago that somewhere along the way, his four children had become more focused on Santa than the meaning of Christmas. No matter how he tried, he could not redirect their attention away from presents and elves to the manger instead."

== Plot summary ==
Before he was "father Christmas", he was simply a father. The Immortal Nicholas follows the story of Agios, a tired, broken man who encounters the Christ child by chance, and studies him throughout his life from a distance. The novel is described by author Glenn Beck as an origin story for Santa Claus.

== Film ==
Beck announced on his radio show that if the book is well received by audiences and sells well enough, a film based upon the novel is already in the works by Mercury Radio Arts and the American Dream Labs.
