= Glenn Beck =

American political commentator (born 1964)

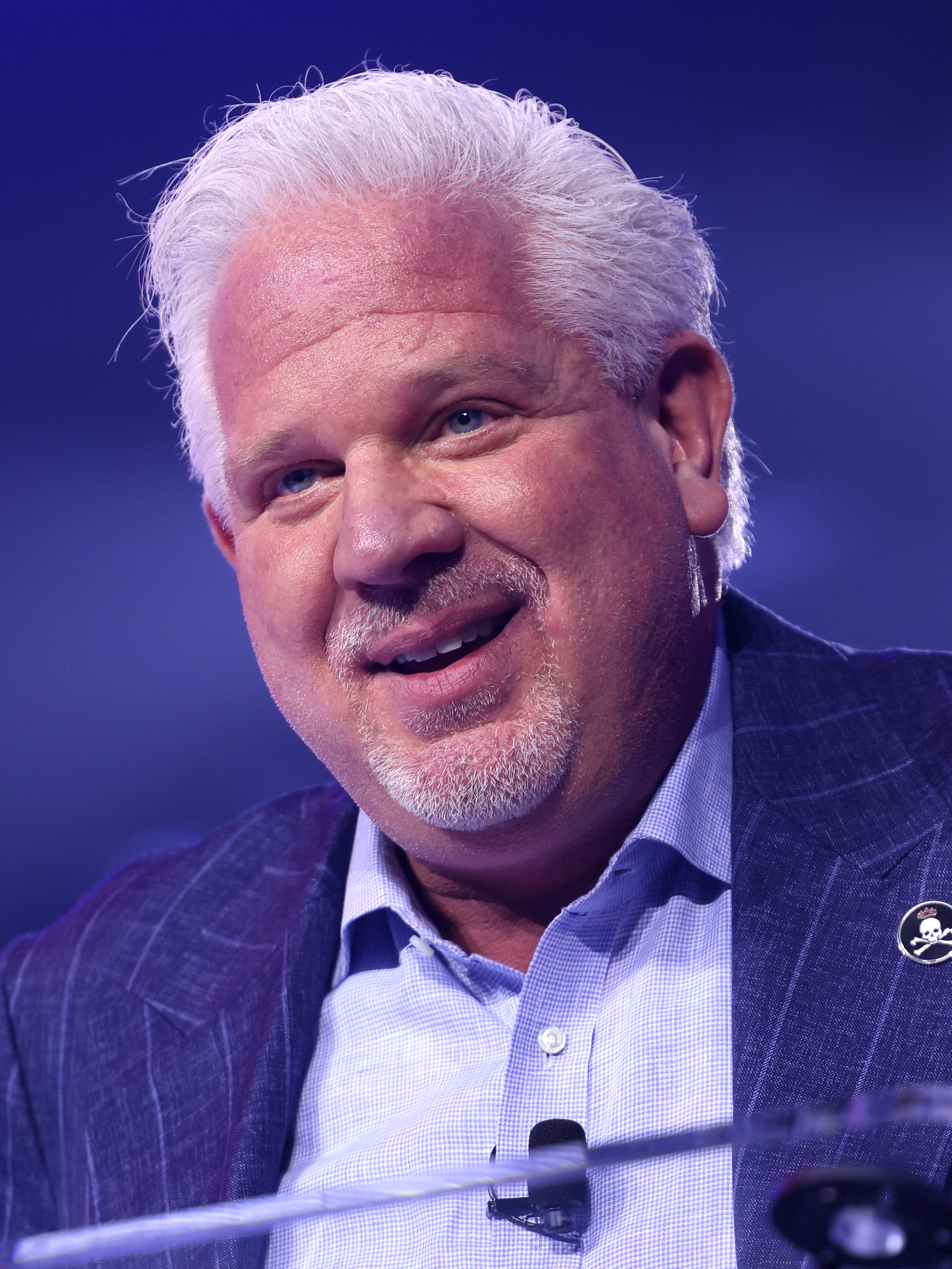
- Beck in 2025
- Born: Glenn Lee Beck; February 10, 1964 (age 62); Everett, Washington, U.S.
- Occupations: Talk show host, political commentator, producer, entrepreneur
- Political party: Republican (before 2014); Independent (2014–present)
- Movement: Conservatism
- Spouses: Claire McCabe (m. 1983; div. 1994) Tania Colonna (m. 1999)
- Children: 4
- Awards: Gene Burns Memorial Award for Freedom of Speech, 2013 (Talkers Magazine); Tribeca Disruptive Innovation Award, 2013; Marconi Award Personality of the Year, 2008
- Website: glennbeck.com

Signature
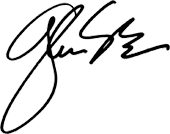

Glenn Lee Beck (born February 10, 1964) is an American conservative political commentator, radio host, entrepreneur, and television producer. He is the CEO, founder, and owner of Mercury Radio Arts, the parent company of his television and radio network TheBlaze. He hosts the Glenn Beck Radio Program, a talk-radio show nationally syndicated on Premiere Radio Networks. Beck also hosts the Glenn Beck television program, which ran from January 2006 to October 2008 on HLN, from January 2009 to June 2011 on Fox News and now airs on TheBlaze. Beck has authored six New York Times–bestselling books.

In April 2011, Beck announced that he would "transition off of his daily program" on Fox News, but would continue to team with Fox. His last daily show on Fox was June 30, 2011. In 2012, The Hollywood Reporter placed Beck on its Digital Power Fifty list. Beck launched TheBlaze in 2011 after leaving Fox News. He hosts an hour-long afternoon program, The Glenn Beck Program, on weekdays, and a three-hour morning radio show; both are broadcast on TheBlaze. Beck is also the producer of TheBlaze's For the Record.

Beck has received both praise and criticism, characterized by his supporters as a defender of traditional American values and by his detractors as a demagogue. During Barack Obama's presidency, Beck promoted conspiracy theories about Obama, his administration, George Soros, and others.

== Early life and education ==
Beck was born in Everett, Washington, the son of Mary Clara (née Janssen) and William Beck, who lived in Mountlake Terrace, Washington, at the time of their son's birth. The family later moved to Mount Vernon, Washington, where they owned and operated a downtown bakery. He is descended from German immigrants who came to the United States in the 19th century. Beck was raised as a Roman Catholic and attended Immaculate Conception Catholic School in Mount Vernon.

Beck and his sister moved with their mother to Sumner, Washington, attending a Jesuit school in Puyallup. In 1979, when Beck was 15, his mother drowned in Puget Sound while fishing with a man in Commencement Bay west of Tacoma. Her companion also drowned; police investigators believed that one of the victims may have fallen overboard and the other drowned in a rescue attempt. Beck has called his mother's death a suicide in interviews.

After their mother's death, Beck moved to his father's home in Bellingham, where Beck graduated from Sehome High School in 1982. Beck also regularly vacationed with his maternal grandparents, Ed and Clara Janssen, in Iowa. In the aftermath of his mother's death and his stepbrother's subsequent suicide, Beck has said he used "Dr. Jack Daniel's" to cope. At 18, after graduating from high school, he moved to Provo, Utah, and worked at radio station KAYK. Feeling he "didn't fit in", Beck left Utah after six months, taking a job at Washington, D.C.'s WPGC in February 1983.

== Personal life ==
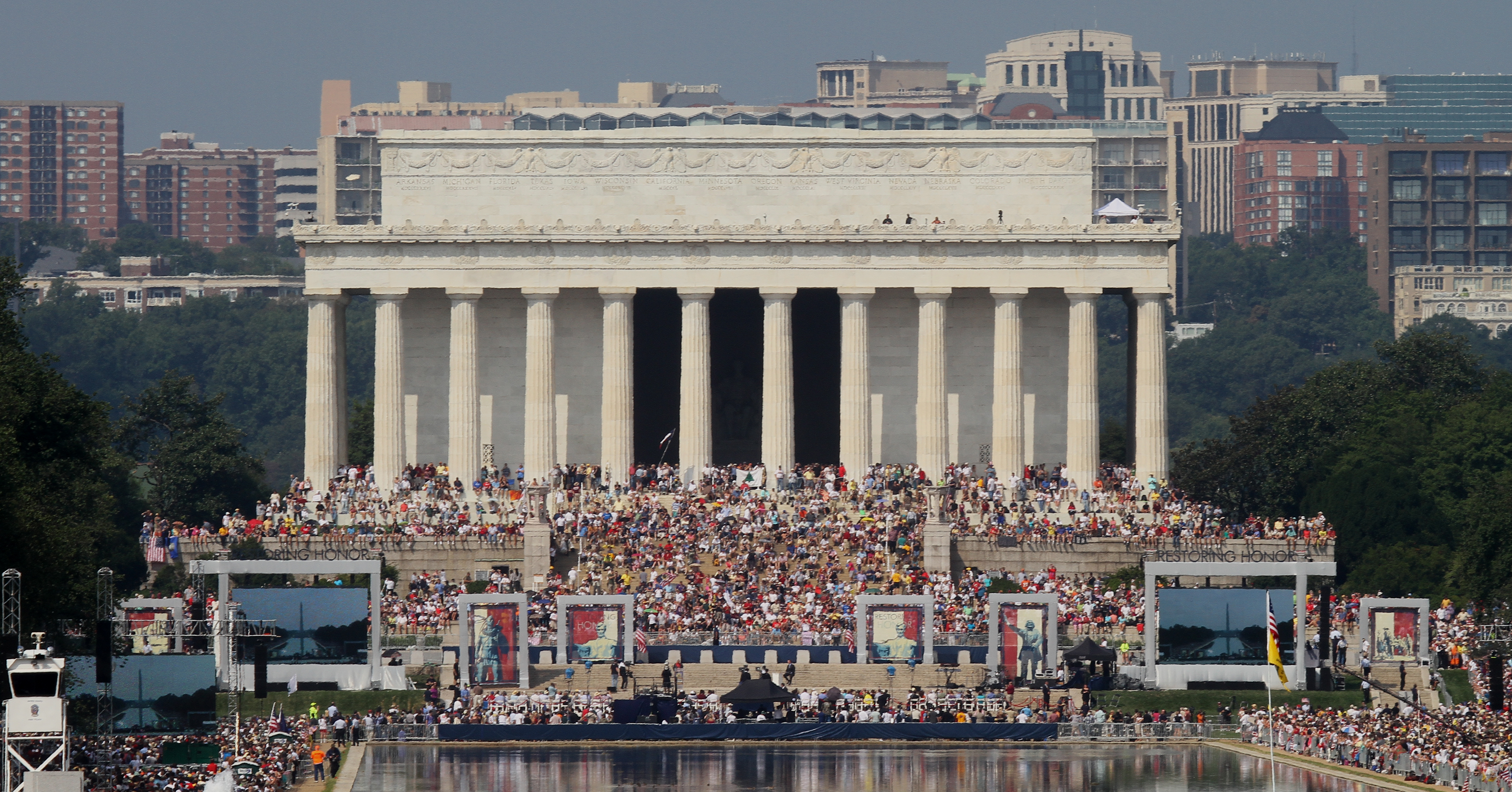
Beck speaking at Restoring Honor at the Lincoln Memorial in 2010

While working at WPGC, Beck met his first wife, Claire. They married in 1983 and had two daughters, Mary and Hannah. Mary developed cerebral palsy as a result of a series of strokes at birth in 1988. The couple divorced in 1994 amid Beck's struggles with substance abuse. He is a recovering alcoholic and drug addict, and has said he has attention deficit hyperactivity disorder (ADHD).

By 1994, Beck was suicidal, and imagined shooting himself to the music of Kurt Cobain. He credits Alcoholics Anonymous (AA) with helping him achieve sobriety. He said he stopped drinking alcohol and smoking cannabis in November 1994, the same month he attended his first AA meeting. Beck later said that he had gotten high every day for the previous 15 years, since the age of 16.

In 1996, while working for a New Haven area radio station, Beck took a theology class at Yale University, with a written recommendation from Senator Joe Lieberman, a Yale alumnus who was a fan of Beck's show at the time. Beck enrolled in an "Early Christology" course, but soon withdrew, marking the extent of his post-secondary education.

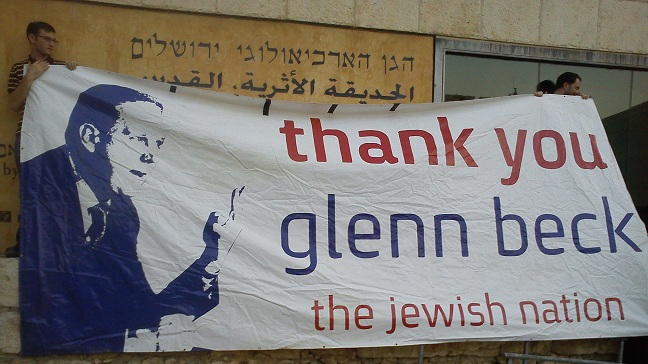
Israeli citizens holding banner at the Jerusalem Restoring Courage rally, in which Beck was the main speaker, 2011

Beck then began a "spiritual quest" in which he "sought out answers in churches and bookstores". As he later recounted in his books and stage performances, Beck's first attempt at self-education involved reading the work of six wide-ranging authors, constituting what Beck jokingly calls "the library of a serial killer": Alan Dershowitz, Pope John Paul II, Adolf Hitler, Billy Graham, Carl Sagan, and Friedrich Nietzsche. During this time, Beck's Mormon friend and former radio partner Pat Gray argued in favor of the "comprehensive worldview" offered by the Church of Jesus Christ of Latter-day Saints, an offer that Beck rejected until a few years later. Later, after moving to the New York City area, he had a consultation with Graham, which he said affected him strongly.

In 1999, Beck married his second wife, Tania. After they went looking for a faith on a church tour together, they joined the Church of Jesus Christ of Latter-day Saints in October 1999, partly at the urging of his daughter Mary. Beck was baptized by Pat Gray. Beck and Tania have two children together. Until April 2011, the couple lived in New Canaan, Connecticut, with the four children.

In July 2010, Beck announced that he had been diagnosed with macular dystrophy, saying, "A couple of weeks ago I went to the doctor because of my eyes. I can't focus my eyes. He did all kinds of tests and he said, 'you have macular dystrophy ... you could go blind in the next year. Or, you might not.'" The disorder can make it difficult to read, drive or recognize faces.

In July 2011, Beck leased a house in the Fort Worth suburb of Westlake, Texas. The Blaze has been based in Irving, Texas, a suburb of Dallas, since 2011.

On November 10, 2014, Beck announced on TheBlaze that he had been suffering from a severe neurological disorder for at least the last five years. He described many strong and debilitating symptoms that made it difficult for him to work, and also announced that he had "a string of health issues that quite honestly made me look crazy, and quite honestly, I have felt crazy because of them". Beck said that a chiropractor who specializes in "chiropractic neurology", Frederick Carrick, had "diagnosed [him] with several health issues, including an autoimmune disorder, which he didn't name, and adrenal fatigue." Over 10 months he had received a series of treatments and felt better. On January 13, 2022, Beck announced that his second case of COVID-19 was "getting into my lungs".

Beck owns a cattle ranch in Idaho.

== Career ==
Glenn Beck has managed to monetize virtually everything that comes out of his mouth.

— Forbes, April 2010

In 2002, Beck created the media platform Mercury Radio Arts as the umbrella over his broadcast, publishing, Internet, and live show interests. Beck founded Mercury Radio Arts in 2002, naming it after the Orson Welles' Mercury Theatre, which produced live radio broadcasts during the 1930s. The company produces all of Beck's productions, including his eponymous radio show, books, live stage shows, and his official website.

=== Radio ===
In 1983, Beck moved to Corpus Christi, Texas, to work at radio station KZFM. In mid-1985, he was hired away from KZFM to be the lead DJ for WRKA's morning-drive radio broadcast in Louisville, Kentucky. His four-hour weekday show was called Captain Beck and the A-Team. Beck had a reputation as a "young up-and-comer". The show was not political and included the genre's usual off-color antics: juvenile jokes, pranks, and impersonations. It slipped to third in the market and Beck left abruptly in 1987 amid a dispute with WRKA management.

Months later, Beck was hired by Phoenix Top-40 station KOY-FM, then known as Y-95. Beck was partnered with Arizona native Tim Hattrick to co-host a local "morning zoo" program. During his time at Y-95, Beck cultivated a rivalry with local pop radio station KZZP and that station's morning host Bruce Kelly. Through practical jokes and publicity stunts, Beck drew criticism from the staff at Y-95 when the rivalry culminated in Beck telephoning Kelly's wife on the air, mocking her recent miscarriage. In 1989, Beck resigned from Y-95 to accept a job in Houston at KRBE, known as Power 104. He was fired in 1990 due to poor ratings.

Beck then moved to Baltimore, Maryland, and the city's leading Top-40 station, WBSB, known as B104. There, he partnered with Pat Gray, a morning DJ. During his tenure at B104, Beck was arrested and jailed for speeding in his DeLorean. According to a former associate, Beck was "completely out of it" when a station manager went to bail him out. After Gray and Beck were fired, they spent six months in Baltimore, planning their next move. In early 1992, they moved to WKCI-FM (KC101), a Top-40 radio station in New Haven, Connecticut. In 1995, WKCI apologized after Beck and Gray mocked a Chinese-American caller on air who felt offended by a comedy segment by playing a gong sound effect and having executive producer Alf Gatineau mock a Chinese accent. That incident led to protests by activist groups. When Gray left the show to move to Salt Lake City, Beck continued with co-host Vinnie Penn. At the end of 1998, Beck was informed that his contract would not be renewed at the end of 1999.

The Glenn Beck Program first aired in 2000 on WFLA (AM) in Tampa, and took its afternoon time slot from 18th to first place within a year. In January 2002, Premiere Radio Networks launched the show nationwide on 47 stations. The show then moved to Philadelphia, Pennsylvania, broadcasting from new flagship station WPHT. On November 5, 2007, The New York Times reported that Premiere Radio Networks was extending Beck's contract. By May 2008, it had reached over 280 terrestrial stations as well as XM Satellite. It was ranked fourth in the nation with over 6.5 million listeners. As of July 2013, Beck was tied for fourth in the ratings, behind Rush Limbaugh, Sean Hannity, and Dave Ramsey.

=== Television ===
In January 2006, CNN's Headline News announced that Beck would host a nightly news-commentary show in its new prime-time block Headline Prime. The show, simply called Glenn Beck, aired weeknights. CNN Headline News called the show "an unconventional look at the news of the day featuring his often amusing perspective". At the end of his tenure at CNN-HLN, Beck had the second-largest audience, behind Nancy Grace. In 2008, he won the Marconi Radio Award for Network Syndicated Personality of the Year.

In October 2008, it was announced that Beck would join the Fox News Channel, leaving CNN Headline News. After moving to Fox, Beck hosted Glenn Beck, beginning in January 2009, as well as a weekend version. One of his first guests was Alaska Governor Sarah Palin. He also had a regular segment on Fridays, "At Your Beck and Call", on the Fox News Channel program The O'Reilly Factor. As of September 2009, Beck's program drew more viewers than all three competing time-slot shows combined on CNN, MSNBC and HLN.

Beck's show's high ratings did not come without controversy. The Washington Post's Howard Kurtz reported that Beck's use of "distorted or inflammatory rhetoric" had complicated the channel's and its journalists' efforts to neutralize White House criticism that Fox is not really a news organization. Television analyst Andrew Tyndall echoed these sentiments, saying that Beck's incendiary style had created "a real crossroads for Fox News", saying, "they're right on the cusp of losing their image as a news organization."

In April 2011, Fox News and Mercury Radio Arts, Beck's production company, announced that Beck would "transition off of his daily program" on Fox News in 2011. His last day at Fox was later announced as June 30. FNC and Beck announced that he would team with Fox to produce a slate of projects for Fox News and its digital properties. Fox News head Roger Ailes later referenced Beck's entrepreneurialism and political movement activism, saying, "His [Beck's] goals were different from our goals ... I need people focused on a daily television show." Beck hosted his last daily show on Fox on June 30, 2011, when he recounted the accomplishments of the show and said, "This show has become a movement. It's not a TV show, and that's why it doesn't belong on television anymore. It belongs in your homes. It belongs in your neighborhoods." In response to critics who said he was fired, Beck pointed out that his final show was airing live. Immediately after the show he did an interview on his new GBTV internet television channel.

==== TheBlaze TV (formerly GBTV) ====
Beck's Fox News one-hour show ended on June 30, 2011, and a new two-hour show began his television network, which started as a subscription-based internet TV network, TheBlaze TV, originally called GBTV, on September 12, 2011. Using a subscription model, it was estimated that Beck was on track to generate $27 million in his first year of operation. This was later upgraded to $40 million by The Wall Street Journal when subscriptions topped 300,000.

=== Books ===
Mercury Ink has a co-publishing deal with Simon & Schuster and was founded by Glenn Beck in 2011 as the publishing imprint of Mercury Radio Arts. Started in 2011, Mercury Ink publishes adult and young adult novels and non-fiction titles. Authors signed to Mercury Ink include Beck and New York Times best seller Richard Paul Evans.

Beck has reached No. 1 on The New York Times Bestseller List in four separate categories as of 2010: Hardcover Non-Fiction, Paperback Non-Fiction, Hardcover Fiction, and Children's Picture Books.

Beck has a chapter giving advice in Tim Ferriss's book Tools of Titans.

=== Stage shows and speeches ===
When Beck meets his fans, he does so with the gusto of a public figure engaging his constituents. People he meets often give him presents and notes. He signs autographs, poses for photos. He has perfected the Everyman shtick that presidential candidates spend years trying to master in places like Iowa.

— The New York Times Magazine, 2010

Since 2005, Beck has toured American cities twice a year, presenting a one-man stage show. His stage productions are a mix of stand-up comedy and inspirational speaking. In a critique of his live act, Salon magazine's Steve Almond describes Beck as a "wildly imaginative performer, a man who weds the operatic impulses of the demagogue to the grim mutterings of the conspiracy theorist". A show from the Beck '08 Unelectable Tour was shown in around 350 U.S. movie theaters.

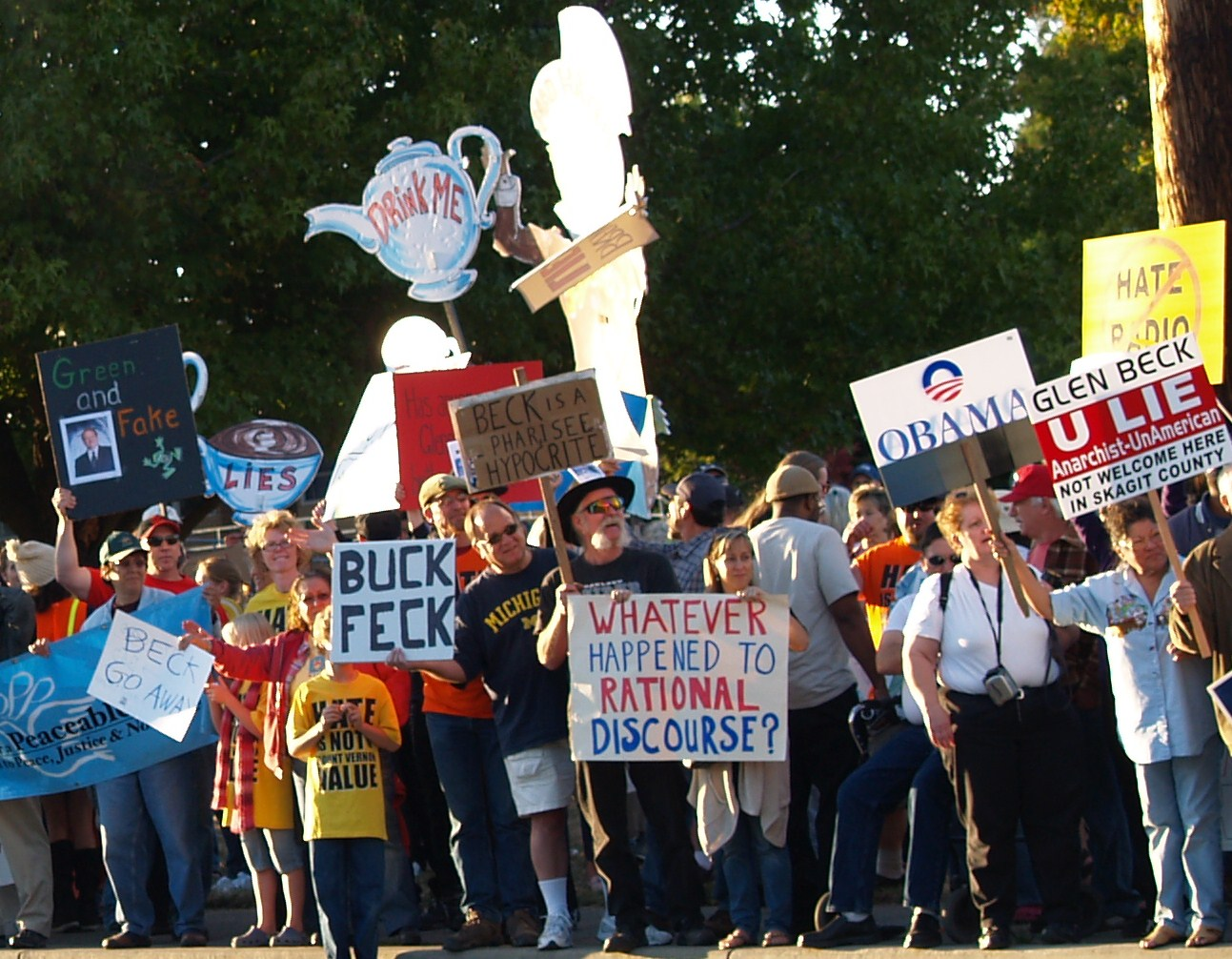

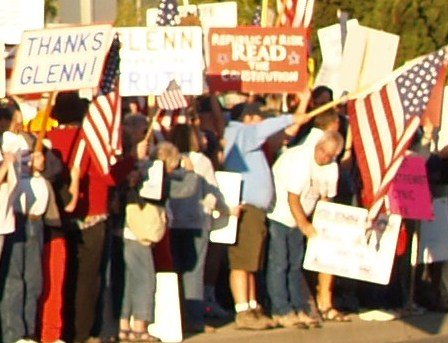
In Beck's hometown of Mt. Vernon, Washington, supporters and detractors hold handmade signs on the day Beck was honored by the mayor.

The finale of 2009's Common Sense Comedy Tour was simulcast in over 440 theaters. The events have drawn 200,000 fans in recent years.

In March 2003, Beck ran a series of rallies, which he called Glenn Beck's Rally for America, in support of troops deployed for the upcoming Iraq War. On July 4, 2007, he hosted the 2007 Toyota Tundra "Stadium of Fire" in Provo, Utah. America's Freedom Foundation presents the annual event at LaVell Edwards Stadium at Brigham Young University. In May 2008, Beck gave the keynote speech at the NRA convention in Louisville, Kentucky.

In late August 2009, the mayor of Beck's hometown, Mount Vernon, Washington, announced that he would award Beck the Key to the City, designating September 26, 2009, as "Glenn Beck Day". Due to local opposition, the city council voted unanimously to disassociate itself from the award. The key presentation ceremony sold out the 850-seat McIntyre Hall and an estimated 800 detractors and supporters demonstrated outside the building. Earlier that day, approximately 7,000 people attended the Evergreen Freedom Foundation's "Take the Field with Glenn Beck" at Seattle's Safeco Field.

In December 2009, Beck produced a one-night special film, The Christmas Sweater: A Return to Redemption. In January and February 2010, he teamed with fellow Fox News host Bill O'Reilly to tour several cities in a live stage show called "The Bold and Fresh Tour 2010". The January 29 show was recorded and broadcast to movie theaters throughout the country.

In July 2013, Beck produced and hosted a one-night stage event, Man in the Moon, held at the USANA Amphitheatre in West Valley City, Utah. The amphitheater sold out all 20,000 of its seats and a recording of the event was released on television and DVD in August 2013. The event was a narrative story told from the Moon's point of view, from the beginnings of the Book of Genesis to the first Moon landing. The Moon narrates the story.

=== Philanthropy ===
In 2011, Beck founded the nonprofit organization Mercury One, the mission of which is to "restore the human spirit by encouraging dependence on God, providing humanitarian aid, preserving heritage, and empowering all to stand for truth." In early 2011, he began work toward developing a clothing line to be sold to benefit the charity. In October 2011, Mercury One began selling the upscale clothing line 1791 exclusively at its website, 1791.com. The clothing in the line's 11-piece inaugural offering was manufactured by American Mojo of Lowell, Massachusetts.

In July 2014, after tens of thousands of undocumented immigrant children crossed into Texas via the Southern United States border, unaccompanied by parents, Beck announced that he, Senator Mike Lee, and Representative Louie Gohmert would travel to the U.S.–Mexico border with Mercury One. He said they would bring tractor trailers full of food, hot meals, and teddy bears for the unaccompanied minors. While Beck made clear in interviews that they wanted a full repeal of DACA, he also said he believed in the importance of helping these children. "Through no fault of their own, they are caught in political crossfire, and while we continue to put pressure on Washington and change its course of lawlessness, we must also help", Beck said. "It is not either/or. It is both. We have to be active in the political game, and we must open our hearts."

As of 2017, Beck's Nazarene Fund had reportedly relocated 10,524 Christian refugees from northern Iraq and Syria to other host countries, including the U.S., Australia, France, Slovakia, Greece, Lebanon, Brazil, and Canada. The fund's website says 1,646 families have been evacuated from the ISIS-ravaged region since its launch in 2014, and 45,000 people have received humanitarian aid as a result of donations to Mercury One.

== Projects and rallies ==
=== 2003 Rallies for America ===
In 2003, during the early stages of the 2003 Invasion of Iraq, Beck called for and helped fund "Rallies for America" in cities across the country to support American troops and counter the anti-Iraq War movement. Around 8,000 people attended the first rally in Cleveland, Ohio, and around 150,000 people are believed to have attended the rallies in total. At the Washington, D.C. rally, letters from President George W. Bush and actor Arnold Schwarzenegger were read.

=== 9-12 Project and Tea Party protests ===
In March 2009, Beck put together a campaign, the 9-12 Project, named after nine principles and 12 values that he says embody the spirit of the American people on the day after the September 11 attacks. The Colorado 9-12 Project hosted a "Patriot Camp" for kids in grades 1–5, featuring programs on "our Constitution, the Founding Fathers, and the values and principles that are the cornerstones of our nation".

=== Restoring Honor rally ===
Beck promoted and hosted the Restoring Honor rally at the Lincoln Memorial in Washington, D.C., on August 28, 2010. The rally—which purported to embrace religious faith and patriotism—was co-sponsored by the Special Operations Warrior Foundation, promoted by FreedomWorks, and supported by the Tea Party movement. Attendance was estimated at 87,000 (± 9,000) based on aerial photos.

=== "America's First Christmas" ===
In December 2010, Beck went to Wilmington, Ohio, a town devastated by the late-2000s recession, to host live events to encourage his fans to go to the town to boost the local economy in a project called "America's First Christmas". He hosted an event and his radio and television shows from the local theater.

=== Restoring Courage 2011 international tour ===
Beck headlined his "Restoring Courage" events in Jerusalem, Israel, in August 2011 in a campaign he said was designed to encourage people worldwide "to stand with the Jewish people", and to "stand with Israel". The rally, held near the Western Wall, drew more than 1,000 attendees, many of them American evangelical Christians. After Jerusalem, Beck visited Cape Town, South Africa, and was scheduled to visit Venezuela.

=== 2012 presidential campaign ===
Actively supporting Mitt Romney as "perhaps the best-known Mormon after the Republican presidential candidate and a major influence on evangelical Christians, ... Beck has emerged as an unlikely theological bridge between the first Mormon presidential nominee and a critical electorate [evangelicals]", according to a pre-election article in The New York Times. Along with personal campaign appearances in Ohio and Iowa, Beck directly addressed doctrinal issues between Mormons and evangelical Christians (the latter often consider the former a "cult" rather than Christian) on his radio show in September 2012. During the one-hour show, he asked his audience, "Does Mitt Romney's Mormonism make him too scary or weird to be elected president of the United States?" The article concluded by addressing the "fear of making Mormonism mainstream" as a reason Beck could be acceptable to evangelicals and Romney not be, quoting John C. Green, the author of The Faith Factor: How Religion Influences American Elections:

There's a difference between a public figure like Glenn Beck and someone who could be the president of the United States. ... Many evangelicals believe this country was founded by Christian leaders. It is important that the person in the White House be positive about Christianity, if not a devout Christian himself.

=== Restoring Love rally and "Day of Service" ===
In August 2012, Beck held a rally at AT&T Stadium in Irving, Texas. The event's theme was service to one's fellow citizens, and loving each other. The event saw a "Day of Service", which saw Mercury One volunteering to feed homeless and disadvantaged people, doing community-building projects, and mowing lawns. It culminated in a keynote speech by Beck imploring the audience to "commit to each other. Go home and wake up your neighbors." Of serving fellow Americans, Beck said, "Those who count us out are counting on one weekend of action, one weekend of speeches. One weekend. One day. Please, my fellow countrymen, let this be the first of many."

=== Restoring Unity and Never Again Is Now ===
In August 2015, Beck and Mercury Radio Arts organized a rally that saw a little over 20,000 people march through the streets of Birmingham, Alabama, in a statement of unity and support for persecuted Christians in Iraq, a cause Mercury One focuses on, and as a call for unity among the American people. After the march, the Birmingham-Jefferson Convention Complex held a rally featuring speakers including Beck, Ted Cruz, Rafael Cruz, Jon Voight, Alveda King, and David Barton.

== Political views ==
Beck has called himself a conservative with libertarian leanings. Among his core values, he lists personal responsibility, private charity, the right to life, freedom of religion, limited government, and the family as the cornerstone of society. Beck believes in low national debt, and has said, "A conservative believes that debt creates unhealthy relationships. Everyone, from the government on down, should live within their means and strive for financial independence." He supports individual gun ownership rights, opposes gun control legislation, and supports the NRA and its state chapters.

Beck rejects the scientific consensus on climate change. He contests the evidence, and has said, "There is more proof for the resurrection of Jesus than man-made climate change." He views the American Clean Energy and Security Act as a form of wealth redistribution, and he has promoted a petition rejecting the Kyoto Protocol. Beck has also criticized Wikipedia, saying it suppresses right-wing media.

Although opposed to illegal immigration, Beck announced in 2014 that Mercury One would make efforts to provide food and relief to the large numbers of migrant children.

On March 18, 2015, Beck announced that he had left the Republican Party, saying that it had failed to effectively stand against Obamacare and immigration reform, and because of its opposition to lawmakers such as Mike Lee and Ted Cruz.

Beck endorsed Cruz for president of the United States in 2016. In October 2016, Beck called opposing Donald Trump a "moral, ethical choice". On the campaign trail in support of Cruz, Beck said, "If Donald Trump wins, it is going to be a snowball to hell." After Cruz dropped out of the race, Beck endorsed independent Evan McMullin.

In 2025, The Jerusalem Post ranked Beck first on its list of "pro-Israel Christian influencers," honouring him for his long-standing public support for Israel and advocacy against antisemitism.

=== Opposition to progressivism ===
What's the difference between a communist or socialist and a progressive? Revolution or evolution? One requires a gun and the other eats away slowly.

— Glenn Beck, keynote address at the February 2010 Conservative Political Action Conference

During his 2010 keynote speech to the Conservative Political Action Conference (CPAC), Beck wrote progressivism on a chalkboard and declared, "This is the disease. This is the disease in America", adding that "progressivism is the cancer in America and it is eating our Constitution!" According to Beck, the progressive ideas of men such as John Dewey, Herbert Croly, and Walter Lippmann, influenced the presidencies of Theodore Roosevelt and Woodrow Wilson, eventually becoming the foundation for President Franklin D. Roosevelt's New Deal. Beck has said that such progressivism infects both main political parties and threatens to "destroy America as it was originally conceived". In his book Common Sense, he argues that "progressivism has less to do with the parties and more to do with individuals who seek to redefine, reshape, and rebuild America into a country where individual liberties and personal property mean nothing if they conflict with the plans and goals of the State."

A collection of progressives whom Beck has called "Crime Inc." make up what he contends is a clandestine conspiracy to take over and transform the United States. Some of these include Cass Sunstein, Van Jones, Andy Stern, John Podesta, Wade Rathke, Joel Rogers and Francis Fox Piven. Other figures Beck has tied to "Crime Inc." include Al Gore, Franklin Raines, Maurice Strong, George Soros, John Holdren and Barack Obama. According to Beck, these people already have or are surreptitiously working to fulfill their agenda with an array of organizations and corporations such as Goldman Sachs, Fannie Mae, ACORN, Apollo Alliance, Tides Center, Chicago Climate Exchange, Generation Investment Management, Enterprise Community Partners, Petrobras, Center for American Progress, and the SEIU. In his quest to root out these "progressives", Beck has compared himself to Israeli Nazi hunters, vowing on his radio show that "to the day I die I am going to be a progressive-hunter. I'm going to find these people that have done this to our country and expose them. I don't care if they're in nursing homes." Beck compared Al Gore to the Nazis while equating the campaign against global warming to the Nazi campaign against the Jews.

According to the book The Philosophy of Conspiracy Theories, Beck "believes in the existence of a large-scale, long-term socialist conspiracy – encompassing elements of both the Democratic and Republican Parties – to deny American citizens their God-given rights to liberty and freedom from taxation."

Progressive historian Sean Wilentz has denounced what he calls Beck's progressive-themed conspiracy theories and "gross historical inaccuracies", contending that Beck is merely echoing the decades-old "right-wing extremism" of the John Birch Society. According to Wilentz, Beck's "version of history" places him in a long line of figures who have challenged mainstream political historians and presented an inaccurate opposing view as the truth, stating:

Glenn Beck is trying to give viewers a version of American history that is supposedly hidden. Supposedly, all we historians – left, right and center – have been doing for the past 100 years is to keep true American history from you. And that true American history is what Glenn Beck is teaching. It's a version of history that is beyond skewed. But of course, that's what Beck expects us to say. He lives in a kind of Alice in Wonderland world, where if people who actually know the history say what he's teaching is junk, he says, 'That's because you're trying to hide the truth.'

Conservative David Frum, a former speechwriter for President George W. Bush, has also alleged Beck's propensity for negationism, remarking, "Beck offers a story about the American past for people who are feeling right now very angry and alienated. It is different enough from the usual story in that he makes them feel like they've got access to secret knowledge."

In 2020, Beck argued that the election of Democratic presidential candidate Bernie Sanders could lead to "another Holocaust."

=== Barack Obama and the Obama administration ===
Beck promoted numerous conspiracy theories and falsehoods about President Barack Obama and the Obama administration. He suggested that Obama was building FEMA concentration camps to put opponents in, that Obama was planning to fake a terrorist attack such as the Oklahoma City bombing to boost the administration's popularity, and that Obama was George Soros's "puppet". He often likened Obama and his administration to Adolf Hitler and the Third Reich. Beck falsely claimed that the John Holdren, who led the Office of Science and Technology Policy in the Obama administration, "proposed forcing abortions and putting sterilants in the drinking water to control population."

In 2009, Beck argued that Obama had repeatedly shown "a deep-seated hatred for white people or the white culture", saying, "I'm not saying he doesn't like white people. I'm saying he has a problem. This guy is, I believe, a racist." These remarks drew criticism and resulted in a boycott in which at least 57 advertisers requested that their ads be removed from his programming. He later apologized for the remarks, telling Fox News Sunday anchor Chris Wallace that he has a "big fat mouth" and miscast as racism what is actually, as he theorizes, Obama's belief in black theology. In November 2012, Beck attempted to auction a mason jar holding an Obama figurine described as submerged in urine but in fact submerged in beer. Bidding reached $11,000 before eBay decided to remove the auction and cancel all bids.

In a 2016 interview with The New Yorker, Beck said of his commentary on Obama: "I did a lot of freaking out about Barack Obama." He added, "Obama made me a better man." Beck said that he regrets calling Obama a racist and supports Black Lives Matter. He said, "There are things unique to the African-American experience that I cannot relate to. I had to listen to them."

==== Van Jones ====
In July 2009, Beck began to focus many episodes on his TV and radio shows on Van Jones, special advisor for Green Jobs at Obama's White House Council on Environmental Quality. Beck called Jones a "self-avowed, radical revolutionary communist". PolitiFact rated Beck's claim "mostly false", noting that Jones, who has been open about his past as a communist during the early 1990s, had since expressed firmly capitalist beliefs.

Beck also criticized Jones for his involvement in STORM, a Bay Area radical group with Marxist roots, and his support for death row inmate Mumia Abu-Jamal, who had been convicted of killing a police officer. Beck spotlighted a video of Jones calling Republicans "assholes", and a petition Jones signed suggesting that George W. Bush knowingly let the September 11 attacks happen. Time magazine credited Beck with leading conservatives' attack on Jones.

In a move The New York Times called a White House response to the controversies, Jones said that "the agenda of this president was bigger than any one individual" and resigned his position in September 2009. Jones called his opponents' attacks as a "vicious smear campaign" and an effort to use "lies and distortions to distract and divide".

==== Cass Sunstein ====
Cass Sunstein, Administrator of the Office of Information and Regulatory Affairs in the Obama White House, was a frequent target of Beck's conspiracy theories. Beck led opposition against Sunstein's nomination to the position, calling Sunstein "the most dangerous man in America" and suggesting that Sunstein was plotting ways to "ban" conspiracy theorizing.

=== ACORN ===
In 2009, Beck and other conservative commentators were critical of Association of Community Organizations for Reform Now (ACORN) making multiple claims including voter registration fraud in the 2008 presidential election. In September 2009, he broadcast a series of alleged undercover videos by conservative activists James O'Keefe and Hannah Giles, which portrayed ACORN community organizers offering inappropriate tax and other advice to people who had said they wanted to import "very young" girls from El Salvador to work as child prostitutes. Following the videos' release, the U.S. Census Bureau severed ties with the group while the U.S. House and Senate voted to cut all of its federal funding.

On December 7, 2009, the former Massachusetts Attorney General, after an independent internal investigation of ACORN, found the videos that had been released appeared to have been edited, "in some cases substantially". He found no evidence of criminal conduct by ACORN employees, but concluded that ACORN had poor management practices that contributed to unprofessional actions by a number of its low-level employees. On March 1, 2010, the District Attorney's office for Brooklyn determined that the videos were "heavily edited" and concluded that there was no criminal wrongdoing by the ACORN staff in the videos from the Brooklyn ACORN office. On April 1, 2010, an investigation by the California Attorney General found the videos from Los Angeles, San Diego and San Bernardino to be "heavily edited", and the investigation did not find evidence of criminal conduct on the part of ACORN employees. On June 14, 2010, the U.S. Government Accountability Office (GAO) released its findings, which showed that ACORN evidenced no sign that it, or any of its related organizations, mishandled any federal money they had received. In March 2010, ACORN announced it would be closing its offices and disbanding due to loss of funding from government and private donors.

According to a 2010 study in the journal Perspectives on Politics, Beck played a prominent role in media attacks on ACORN.

=== Satire website ===
In 2009, lawyers for Beck brought a case (Beck v. Eiland-Hall) against the owner of a satirical website named GlennBeckRapedAndMurderedAYoungGirlIn1990.com with the World Intellectual Property Organization (WIPO). The claim that the domain name of the website is itself defamatory was described as a first in cyberlaw. Beck's lawyers argued that the site infringed on his trademarked name and that the domain name should be turned over to Beck. The WIPO ruled against Beck, but Eiland-Hall voluntarily transferred the domain to Beck anyway, saying that the First Amendment had been upheld and that he no longer had a use for the domain name.

=== Jewish Funds for Justice ===
In January 2011, in protest against what they saw as inappropriate references to the Holocaust and to Nazis by Beck (and by Roger Ailes of Fox News), four hundred rabbis signed an open letter published as a paid advertisement in The Wall Street Journal. The ad was paid for by Jewish Funds for Justice (JFFJ), which had previously called for Beck's firing. The JFFJ have claimed on their website that Beck seems "to draw his material straight from the anti-Semitic forgery, the Protocols of the Elders of Zion". The letter states that Beck and Fox had "diminish[ed] the memory and meaning of the Holocaust when you use it to discredit any individual or organization you disagree with. That is what Fox News has done in recent weeks." In response, a Fox News executive told Reuters the letter was from a "George Soros-backed leftwing political organization".

=== George Soros conspiracy theories ===
Beck is a prominent proponent of conspiracy theories about George Soros, a Jewish philanthropist. Beck falsely claimed that Soros as a boy helped to "send the Jews to the death camps." Beck frequently referred to Soros as a puppet-master and repeated the unsubstantiated conspiracy theory that Soros caused the 1997 Asian financial crisis. In 2010, Beck was accused of being anti-Semitic due to his smears against Soros. The Anti-Defamation League said Beck's remarks about Soros sending Jews to the death camps were "horrific" and "totally off-limits."

On February 22, 2011, during a discussion on his radio show about the controversy surrounding his earlier comments about Soros, Beck said "Reform Rabbis are generally political in nature. It's almost like radicalized Islam in a way where it's less about religion than it is about politics." He was quickly criticized by other conservatives, rabbis, and others. The Anti-Defamation League labeled Beck's remarks "bigoted ignorance". On February 24, Beck apologized on air, agreeing that his comments were "ignorant".

In 2016, Beck, a friend of actor and director Mel Gibson claimed he and Gibson shared a conversation in which Gibson claimed Jewish people had stolen a copy of The Passion of the Christ before its official theatrical release, and that Jewish people were assaulting him in the streets.

=== 2011 Norway attacks ===
Beck condemned the 2011 Norway attacks, but was condemned for his comparison of murdered and surviving members of the Norwegian Workers' Youth League to the Hitler Youth. He said, "There was a shooting at a political camp which sounds a little like, you know, the Hitler Youth or whatever, you know what I mean. Who does a camp for kids that's all about politics? Disturbing." The statement was ill-received in Norway, prompting political commentator and Labour party member Frank Aarebrot to label Beck as a "vulgar propagandist", a "swine" and a "fascist", and Torbjørn Eriksen, former press secretary to Norway's prime minister Jens Stoltenberg, to describe Beck's comment as "a new low", adding that "Glenn Beck's comments are ignorant, incorrect and extremely hurtful". Commentators pointed out that groups affiliated with the Tea Party movement and the Beck-founded 9–12 Project also sponsor politically oriented camp programs for children.

=== Trump comments and 2016 SiriusXM suspension ===
Beck opposed Donald Trump during his 2016 campaign for president, comparing him to Adolf Hitler and describing him as "an immoral man who is absent decency or dignity."

SiriusXM suspended Beck on May 31, 2016, for remarks made during an interview a week earlier. During an interview with author Brad Thor about a hypothetical situation where Trump was abusing his power as president and Congress was unable to stop him, Thor asked "what patriot will step up and [assassinate him] if, if, he oversteps his mandate as president?" Thor and the show's general manager both denied that the comments were a call for his assassination. Beck's radio show was moved from the SiriusXM Patriot channel to the Triumph channel soon after.

Beck's opposition to Trump did not sit well with many Trump supporters and hurt his businesses and viewership. On May 18, 2018, Beck stated on his radio program that he intended to vote for Trump in the 2020 presidential election, calling Trump's record "pretty damn amazing". Beck said Trump's defeat in the 2020 election would be "the end of the country as we know it."

=== Agriculture ===
Beck, a cattle rancher, lobbied president Trump to allow farmers and ranchers the right to sell meat processed in facilities not subject to inspection by the Department of Agriculture.

== Influences ==
=== Political and historical ===
The old American mind-set that Richard Hofstadter famously called the paranoid style—the sense that Masons or the railroads or the Pope or the guys in black helicopters are in league to destroy the country—is aflame again, fanned from both right and left ... No one has a better feeling for this mood, and no one exploits it as well, as Beck. He is the hottest thing in the political-rant racket, left or right.

— David Von Drehle, Time, 2009

An author with ideological influence on Beck is W. Cleon Skousen (1913–2006), a prolific conservative political writer, American constitutionalist and faith based political theorist. As an anti-communist supporter of the John Birch Society, and a limited-government activist, Skousen, who was Mormon, wrote on a wide range of subjects: the Six-Day War, Mormon eschatology, New World Order conspiracies, even parenting. Skousen believed that American political, social, and economic elites were working with communists to foist a world government on the United States. Beck praised Skousen's "words of wisdom" as "divinely inspired", referencing Skousen's The Naked Communist and especially The 5,000 Year Leap (originally published in 1981), which Beck said in 2007 had "changed his life". According to Skousen's nephew, Mark Skousen, Leap reflects Skousen's "passion for the United States Constitution", which he "felt was inspired by God and the reason behind America's success as a nation". The book is recommended by Beck as "required reading" to understand the current American political landscape and become a "September twelfth person". Beck authored a foreword for the 2008 edition of Leap and Beck's on-air recommendations in 2009 propelled the book to number one in the government category on Amazon for several months. In 2010, Matthew Continetti of the conservative Weekly Standard criticized Beck's conspiratorial bent, terming him "a Skousenite". Additionally, Alexander Zaitchik, author of the 2010 book Common Nonsense: Glenn Beck and the Triumph of Ignorance, which features an entire chapter on "The Ghost of Cleon Skousen", refers to Skousen as "Beck's favorite author and biggest influence", while observing he authored four of the 10 books on Beck's 9-12 Project required-reading list.

In his discussion of Beck and Skousen, Continetti said that one of Skousen's works "draws on Carroll Quigley's Tragedy and Hope (1966), which argues that the history of the 20th century is the product of secret societies in conflict". He observed in Beck's novel, The Overton Window (which Beck describes as "faction", or fiction based on fact), a character says: "Carroll Quigley laid open the plan in Tragedy and Hope, the only hope to avoid the tragedy of war was to bind together the economies of the world to foster global stability and peace."

Beck's views on early-20th-century progressivism are greatly influenced by Ronald J. Pestritto, who teaches at Hillsdale College. The portal page GlennBeck.com for "American Progressivism" uses Pestritto's teachings and links directly to one of his books. Pestritto wrote an article for The Wall Street Journal detailing "Glenn Beck, Progressives and Me". The New York Times observed that Pestritto was a regular guest on Beck's Fox News show, .

Princeton University historian Sean Wilentz says that alongside Skousen, John Birch Society founder Robert W. Welch, Jr., is a key ideological foundation of Beck's worldview. According to Wilentz, Beck "has brought neo-Birchite ideas to an audience beyond any that Welch or Skousen might have dreamed of."

Other books that Beck regularly cites on his programs are Amity Shlaes's The Forgotten Man, Jonah Goldberg's Liberal Fascism, Larry Schweikart and Michael Allen's A Patriot's History of the United States, and Burton W. Folsom, Jr.'s New Deal or Raw Deal. Beck has also urged his listeners to read The Coming Insurrection, a book by a French Marxist group discussing what they see as the imminent collapse of capitalist culture.

On June 4, 2010, Beck endorsed Elizabeth Dilling's 1936 work The Red Network: A Who's Who and Handbook of Radicalism for Patriots, remarking, "this is a book, The Red Network, this came in from 1936. People, [Joseph] McCarthy was absolutely right ... This is, who were the communists in America." Beck was criticized by an array of people, including Menachem Z. Rosensaft and Joe Conason, who said that Dilling was an outspoken anti-Semite and a Nazi sympathizer.

=== Religious ===
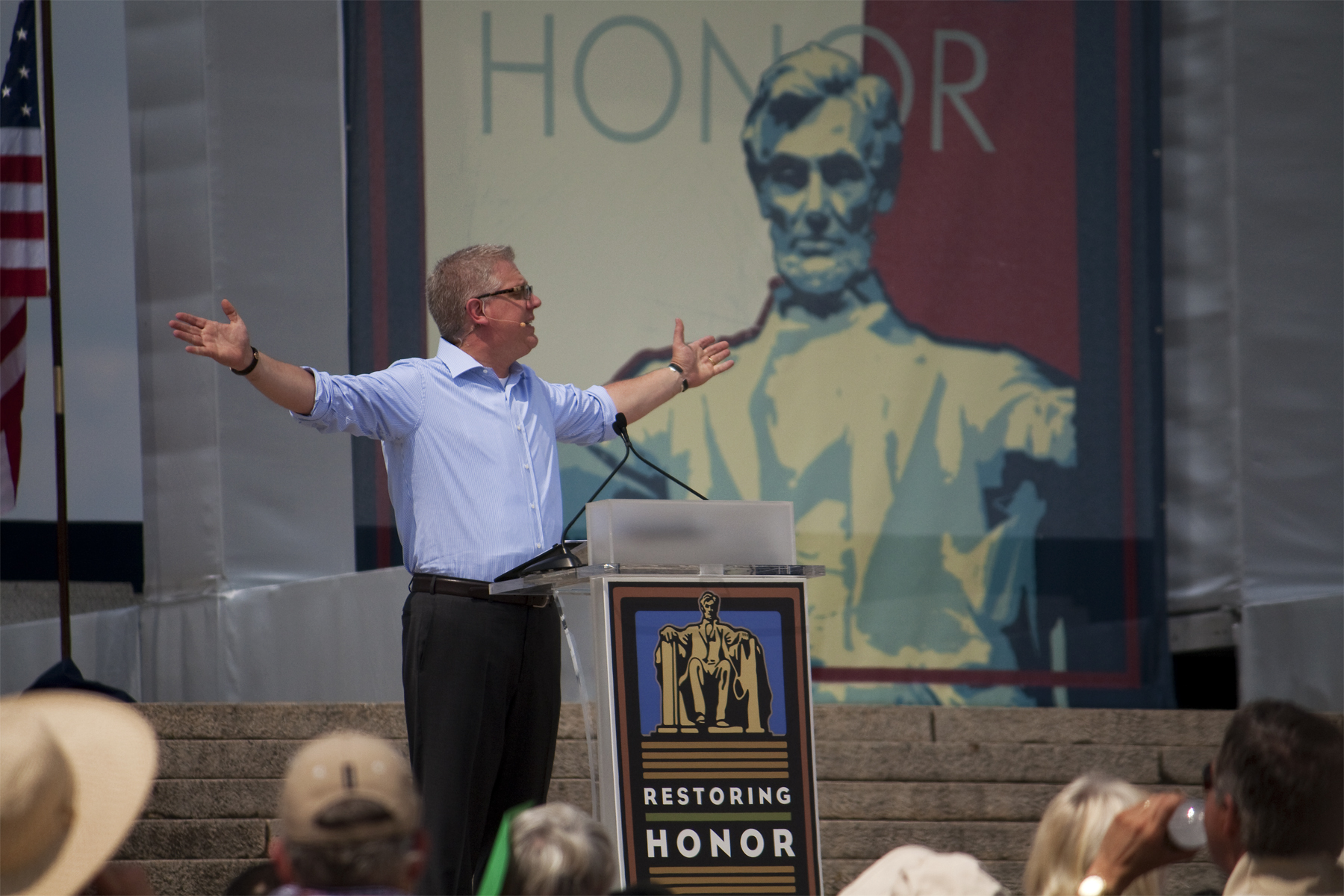
Beck during his religiously themed speech at the Restoring Honor rally on August 28, 2010

Beck has credited God for saving him from drug and alcohol abuse, professional obscurity, and friendlessness. In 2006, he performed an inspirational monologue in Salt Lake City, Utah, detailing how he was transformed by the "healing power of Jesus Christ", which was released as a CD two years later by Deseret Book, a publishing company owned by the LDS Church, entitled An Unlikely Mormon: The Conversion Story of Glenn Beck.

Writer Joanna Brooks contends that Beck developed his "amalgamation of anti-communism" and "connect-the-dots conspiracy theorizing" only after his entry into the "deeply insular world of Mormon thought and culture". Brooks theorizes that Beck's calls to fasting and prayer are rooted in Mormon collective fasts to address spiritual challenges, while his "overt sentimentality" and penchant for weeping represent the hallmark of a "distinctly Mormon mode of masculinity" where "appropriately-timed displays of tender emotion are displays of power" and spirituality. Philip Barlow, the Arrington chair of Mormon history and culture at Utah State University, has said that Beck's belief that the U.S. Constitution was an "inspired document" and his calls for limited government and not exiling God from the public sphere "have considerable sympathy in Mormonism". Beck has acknowledged that Mormon doctrine is different from traditional Christianity, but said that this was what attracted him to it: "For me some of the things in traditional doctrine just doesn't work."

== Public reception ==
To his admirers, Glenn Beck has been a voice crying in the wilderness, a prophet who warns us that we have been wandering in darkness too long. To detractors, he is a clown and a buffoon, at best, a dangerous demagogue, at worst.

— Lee Harris, The Weekly Standard, 2010

In 2009, Beck's show was one of the highest rated news commentary programs on cable TV. For a Barbara Walters ABC special, Beck was selected as one of America's "Top 10 Most Fascinating People" of 2009. In 2010, he was selected for Time's top 100 most influential people under the "Leaders" category.

Beck has called himself an entertainer, a commentator rather than a reporter, and a "rodeo clown". He has said that he identifies with Howard Beale, a character portrayed by Peter Finch in the film Network: "When he came out of the rain and he was like, 'none of this makes any sense'—I am that guy."

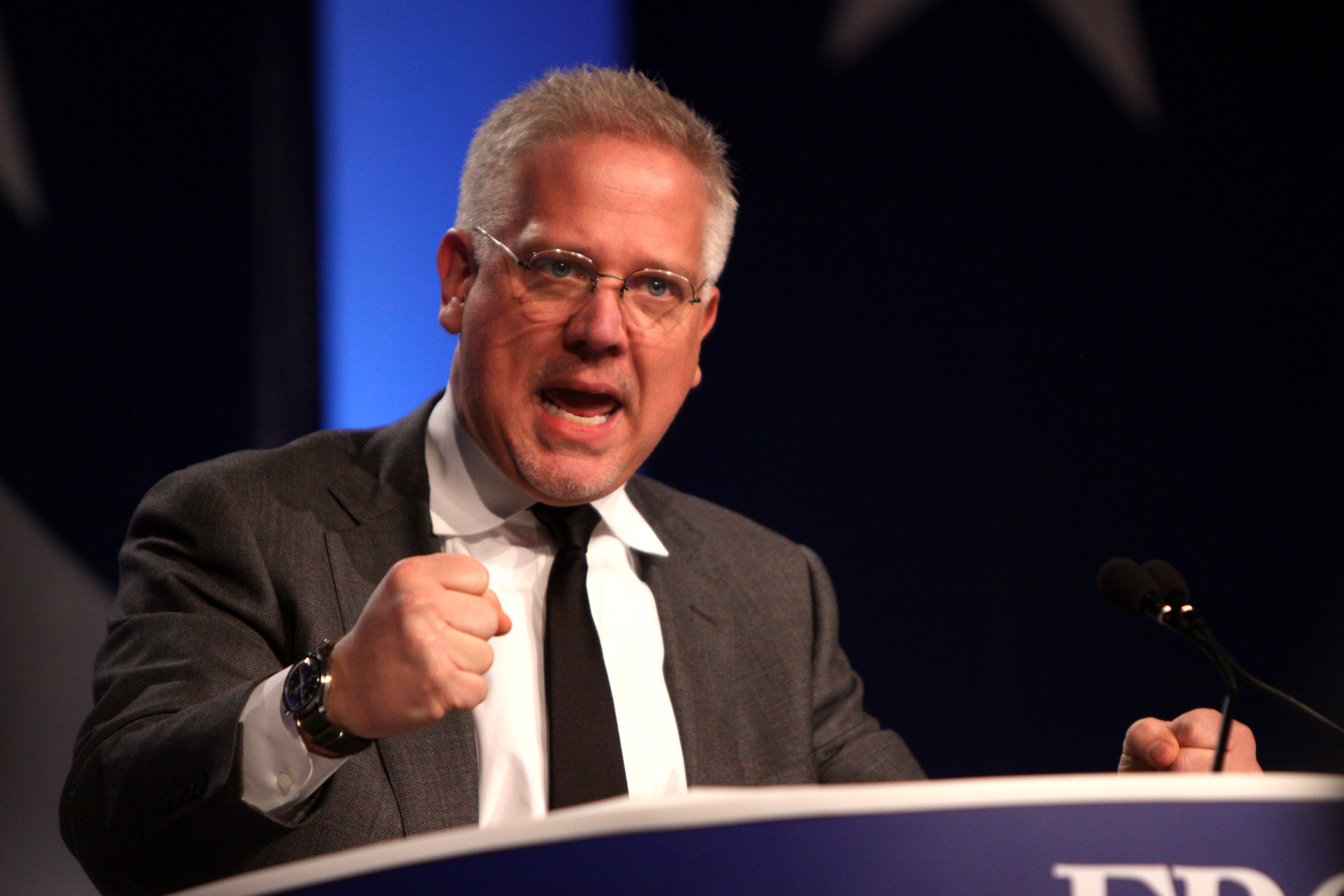
Beck at CPAC 2011

According to Tampa Bay Times, Beck's supporters have praised him as a constitutional stalwart defending their traditional American values.

Time magazine described Beck as "the new populist superstar of Fox News", saying it is easier to see a set of attitudes rather than a specific ideology, noting his criticism of Wall Street, yet defending bonuses to AIG, as well as denouncing conspiracy theories about the Federal Emergency Management Agency (FEMA) but warning against indoctrination of children by the AmeriCorps program." (Paul Krugman and Mark Potok, on the other hand, have been among those asserting that Beck helps spread "hate" by covering issues that stir up extremists.) What seems to unite Beck's disparate themes, Time argued, is a sense of siege. An earlier Time cover story called Beck "a gifted storyteller with a knack for stitching seemingly unrelated data points into possible conspiracies", proclaiming that he has "emerged as a virtuoso on the strings" of conservative discontent by mining "the timeless theme of the corrupt Them thwarting a virtuous Us".

Beck's shows have been called a "mix of moral lessons, outrage and an apocalyptic view of the future ... capturing the feelings of an alienated class of Americans". One of Beck's Fox News Channel colleagues, Shepard Smith, has jokingly called Beck's studio the "fear chamber", with Beck countering that he preferred the term "doom room".

Republican South Carolina U.S. Senator Lindsey Graham criticized Beck as a "cynic" whose show was antithetical to "American values" at The Atlantic's 2009 First Draft of History conference, remarking, "Only in America can you make that much money crying." The progressive watchdog group Fairness and Accuracy in Reporting's (FAIR) Activism Director, Peter Hart, argues that Beck red-baits political adversaries and promotes a paranoid view of progressive politics. Howard Kurtz, of The Washington Post, has remarked, "Love him or hate him, Beck is a talented, often funny broadcaster, a recovering alcoholic with an unabashedly emotional style."

Laura Miller writes in Salon that Beck is a contemporary example of "the paranoid style in American politics" described by historian Richard Hofstader:

The Paranoid Style in American Politics reads like a playbook for the career of Glenn Beck, right down to the paranoid's "quality of pedantry" and "heroic strivings for 'evidence'", embodied in Beck's chalkboard and piles of books. But Beck lacks an archenemy commensurate with his stratospheric ambitions, which makes him appear even more absurd to outsiders.

Beck has acknowledged accusations of being a conspiracy theorist, saying on his show that there is a "concentrated effort now to label me a conspiracy theorist".

Particularly as a consequence of Beck's Restoring Honor rally in 2010, the fact that Beck is Mormon caused concern among some politically sympathetic Christian Evangelicals on theological grounds. Tom Tradup, vice president at Salem Radio Network, which serves more than 2,000 Christian-themed stations, expressed this sentiment after the rally, saying, "Politically, everyone is with it, but theologically, when he says the country should turn back to God, the question is: Which God?" A September 2010 survey by the Public Religion Research Institute (PRRI) and Religion News Service (RNS) found that of those Americans who hold a favorable opinion of Beck, only 45% believe he is the right person to lead a religious movement, with that number further declining to 37% when people are informed he is Mormon. Daniel Cox, director of research for PRRI, summed up this position by stating:

The disparity between Glenn Beck's favorability ratings and how people feel about him as a religious leader suggests that people are more drawn to him for political reasons than religious ones. Many of Beck's strongest supporters, such as Republicans and white Evangelicals, perceive real differences between their own faith and Beck's Mormon faith, and this may become a liability in his efforts to lead as a religious figure.

Pete Peterson of Pepperdine's Davenport Institute said that Beck's speech at the rally belonged to an American tradition of calls to personal renewal. Peterson wrote: "A Mormon surrounded onstage by priests, pastors, rabbis, and imams, Beck [gave] one of the more ecumenical jeremiads in history." Evangelical pastor Tony Campolo said in 2010 that conservative evangelicals respond to Beck's framing of conservative economic principles, saying that Beck's and ideological fellow travelers' "marriage between evangelicalism and patriotic nationalism is so strong that anybody who is raising questions about loyalty to the old, lassez-faire capitalist system is ex-post facto unpatriotic, un-American, and by association non-Christian." Newsweek religion reporter Lisa Miller, after quoting Campolo, opined, "It's ironic that Beck, a Mormon, would gain acceptance as a leader of a new Christian coalition. ... Beck's gift ... is to articulate God's special plan for America in such broad strokes that they trample no single creed or doctrine while they move millions with their message."

=== Critical biographies ===
In June 2010, investigative reporter Alexander Zaitchik released a critical biography, Common Nonsense: Glenn Beck and the Triumph of Ignorance, with a title mocking Beck's work, Common Sense. In an interview about the book, Zaitchik theorized, "Beck's politics and his insatiable hunger for money and fame are not mutually exclusive", adding:

Beck's true religion is not Patriotism, Mormonism, or Conservatism. His true religion is cross-platform self-marketing ... According to Beck's worldview, there's no inherent contradiction between his sophisticated instinct for self-promotion, his propagandist rodeo clown act, his self-image as a media mogul, and his professed belief system. I think he actually believes that God wants him to make a ton of money and become this huge celebrity by fear mongering and generally doing whatever it takes in the media to promote right-wing causes.

In September 2010, Philadelphia Daily News reporter Will Bunch released The Backlash: Right-Wing Radicals, High-Def Hucksters, and Paranoid Politics in the Age of Obama. One of Bunch's theses is that Beck is nothing more than a morning zoo deejay playing a fictional character as a money-making stunt. Writer Bob Cesca, in a review of Bunch's book, compares Beck to Steve Martin's faith-healer character in the 1992 film Leap of Faith, before describing the "derivative grab bag of other tried and tested personalities" that Bunch contends comprises Beck's persona:

His [Beck's] adenoidal "Clydie Clyde" voice is based on morning zoo pioneer Scott Shannon's "Mr. Leonard" character. His history is borrowed from the widely debunked work of W. Cleon Skousen. His conspiracy theories are horked from Alex Jones and maybe Jack Van Impe. His anti-Obama, anti-socialist monologues are pure Joe McCarthy. His chalkboard is stolen from televangelist Gene Scott. His solemn, over-processed radio monologue delivery is a dead ringer for Eric Bogosian in Talk Radio. This is all well-worn stuff, but no one has drawn it all together and sculpted it for the purpose of conning an especially susceptible audience during turbulent racial and economic times.

In October 2010 a polemical biography by Dana Milbank was released: Tears of a Clown: Glenn Beck and the Tea Bagging of America.

=== Satire, spoof and parody ===
Beck has been the subject of mockery and ridicule by a number of humorists. In response to his animated delivery and views, he was parodied in an impersonation by Jason Sudeikis on Saturday Night Live. The Daily Show's Jon Stewart has spoofed Beck's 9–12 project with his own "11-3 project", consisting of "11 principles and 3 herbs and spices", impersonated Beck's chalk board-related presentation style for an entire show, and quipped about Beck: "finally, a guy who says what people who aren't thinking are thinking". Stephen Colbert of The Colbert Report satirized Beck's "war room" by creating his own "doom bunker". Through the character Eric Cartman, South Park parodied Beck's television program and his commentary style in the episode "Dances with Smurfs". The Onion, a satirical periodical and faux news site, ran an Onion News Network video "special report" lamenting that the "victim in a fatal car accident was tragically not Glenn Beck". Meanwhile, the Current TV cartoon SuperNews! ran an animated cartoon feature titled "The Glenn Beck Apocalypse", where Beck is confronted by Jesus Christ, who rebukes him as the equivalent of "Sarah Palin farting into a balloon". Political comedian and satirist Bill Maher has mocked Beck's followers as an "army of diabetic mallwalkers", while The Buffalo Beast named Beck the most loathsome person in America in 2010, declaring, "It's like someone found a manic, doom-prophesying hobo in a sandwich board, shaved him, shot him full of Zoloft and gave him a show." The October 30, 2010, Rally To Restore Sanity and/or Fear in Washington, hosted by Comedy Central personalities Jon Stewart and Stephen Colbert, was conceived as a parody of Beck's earlier Rally to Restore Honor, even though Stewart and Colbert said that they came up with the idea of holding a rally in March and Stewart had put down the deposit for the National Mall before Beck announced his rally.

== Defamation lawsuit and settlement ==
In March 2014, Abdulrahman Alharbi filed suit for defamation in the U.S. District Court for the District of Massachusetts against Beck and his business entities, The Blaze and Mercury Radio Arts, along with his distributor Premiere Radio Networks. Alharbi's defamation claim arose from Beck's repeated broadcasts "identifying Alharbi as an active participant" in the Boston Marathon bombing, even after federal authorities cleared Alharbi, who was injured in the attack, of any wrongdoing and confirmed that he was an innocent victim. In December 2014, the judge rejected Beck's attempt to have the case dismissed. In September 2016, the suit was settled on confidential terms.

== Works ==
Non-fiction

- The Real America: Messages from the Heart and Heartland. Simon & Schuster. 2003. ISBN 978-0-7434-9696-4.
- An Inconvenient Book: Real Solutions to the World's Biggest Problems. Simon & Schuster. 2007. ISBN 978-1-4165-5219-2.
- America's March to Socialism: Why We're One Step Closer to Giant Missile Parades. 2008. (Audiobook).
- An Unlikely Mormon: The Conversion Story of Glenn Beck, Deseret Book 2008 (Audiobook). ISBN 978-1-59038-944-7.
- Arguing with Idiots: How to Stop Small Minds and Big Government, Simon & Schuster 2009. ISBN 978-1-4165-9501-4.
- Glenn Beck's Common Sense: The Case Against an Out-of-Control Government, Simon & Schuster 2009. ISBN 978-1-4391-6857-8.
- America's March to Socialism: Why We're One Step Closer to Giant Missile Parades, Simon & Schuster Audio 2009 (Audio CD). ISBN 978-0-7435-9854-5.
- Idiots Unplugged, Simon & Schuster 2010 (Audio CD). ISBN 1-4423-3396-0.
- Broke: The Plan to Restore Our Trust, Truth, and Treasure, Simon & Schuster 2010. ISBN 1-4423-3457-6.
- The 7: Seven Wonders That Will Change Your Life, Keith Ablow, co-author; Threshold Editions, 2011; ISBN 978-1-4516-2551-6.
- Being George Washington: The Indispensable Man, As You've Never Seen Him. Simon & Schuster. 2011. ISBN 978-1-4516-5931-3.
- The Original Argument: The Federalists' Case for the Constitution, Adapted for the 21st Century, with Joshua Charles; Threshold Editions, 2011; ISBN 978-1-4516-5061-7.
- Cowards: What Politicians, Radicals, and the Media Refuse to Say. Simon & Schuster. 2012. ISBN 978-1-4516-9347-8.
- Miracles and Massacres: True and Untold Stories of the Making of America. Threshold Editions. 2013. ISBN 978-1-4767-6474-0.
- Dreamers and Deceivers: True Stories of the Heroes and Villains Who Made America. Threshold Editions. 2014. ISBN 978-1-4767-8389-5.
- Liars: How Progressives Exploit Our Fears for Power and Control, Threshold Editions 2016. ISBN 978-1-4767-9885-1
- Addicted to Outrage: How Thinking Like a Recovering Addict Can Heal the Country, Threshold Editions 2018. ISBN 978-1-4767-9886-8
- The Great Reset: Joe Biden and the Rise of Twenty-First-Century Fascism, Justin Haskins, co-author; Forefront Books, 2021; ISBN 978-1-6376-3059-4.

Control series

- Control: Exposing the Truth About Guns. Threshold Editions. 2013. ISBN 978-1-4767-3988-5.
- Conform: Exposing the Truth About Common Core and Public Education. Threshold Editions. 2014. ISBN 978-1-4767-7388-9.
- It IS About Islam: Exposing the Truth About ISIS, Al Qaeda, Iran, and the Caliphate. Threshold Editions. 2015. ISBN 978-1-5011-2612-3.

Fiction

- The Christmas Sweater, Simon & Schuster 2008. ISBN 978-1-4165-9485-7.
- The Overton Window, Threshold Editions J2010. ISBN 978-1-4391-8430-1
- Beck, Glenn; Baart, Nicole (2011). The Snow Angel. Threshold Editions. ISBN 978-1-4391-8720-3.
- Beck, Glenn; Parke, Harriet (2012). Agenda 21. Threshold Editions. ISBN 978-1-4767-1669-5.
- The Eye of Moloch, Threshold Editions June 2013. ISBN 978-1-4516-3583-6
- Agenda 21: Into the Shadows, Threshold Editions 2015. ISBN 978-1-4767-4682-1
- The Immortal Nicholas, Mercury Ink 2015. ISBN 978-1-4767-9884-4

Children's

- The Christmas Sweater: A Picture Book, Simon & Schuster Children's Publishing 2009. ISBN 978-1-4169-9543-2.
- Beck, Glenn; Schoebinger, Chris; Dorman, Brandon (illustrator) (2011). The Snow Angel. Aladdin Books. ISBN 978-1-4424-4448-5.

As comic book author

- Political Power: Glenn Beck, by Jerome Maida, Mark Sparacio (illus.); Bluewater Productions, 2011

== See also ==
- Beck University
- Conservative talk radio
- List of most-listened-to radio programs
