= Beck University =

Online education program by Glenn Beck

- Formation: 2011
- Type: Online education program
- Founder: Glenn Beck

Beck University was a web-based education program launched in July 2010 by American radio and television host Glenn Beck's Mercury Radio Arts. Beck University offered online classes in subjects such as religion, American history, and economics that emphasized Beck's Conservative Christian views. The classes were offered to anyone who subscribes to Beck's TheBlaze. Despite the use of the term "university" in the title, Beck University's courses are not for credit, and Beck himself never completed any college or university courses.

== Courses ==
The charter selection of courses offered by Beck University, as of July 2010, included Faith 101, 102, and 103; Hope 101, 102, and 103; and Charity 101, 102 and 103. The classes consist of weekly lectures every Wednesday night.

Faith 101 dealt with American history and is taught by David Barton, whom Beck has praised as "the Library of Congress in shoes". Barton is an evangelical Christian minister and author who is known "for his argument that the founding fathers renounced the separation of church and state".

Hope 101 dealt with economics and was taught by David L. Buckner, who operates an executive training institute and is an adjunct professor of psychology and education at Columbia University Teachers College, as well as an adjunct professor of business at the Stern School of Business at New York University.

Charity 101 was taught by the chair of Louisiana State University political science department James R. Stoner, Jr. The course made the connection between the Constitution, The Federalist Papers, and the U.S. as a charitable nation.

== Coat of arms ==
Beck University's coat of arms (based on Princeton University's coat of arms) features a quill, an American bison, and an image of George Washington, as well as the motto "Tyrannis Seditio, Obsequium Deo", which is Latin for "Revolution against tyrants, submission to God".
