= Doc Thompson =

American political commentator (1969–2019)

Michael 'Doc' Thompson
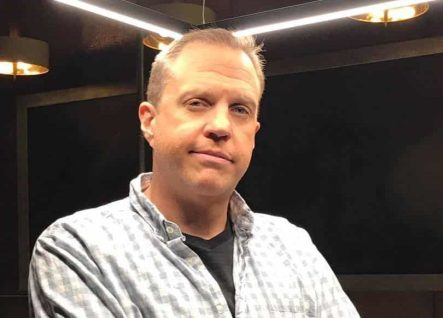
- Born: Michael Dean Thompson; May 6, 1969; Ohio
- Died: February 5, 2019 (aged 49); Haltom City, Texas
- Spouse: Yuna Lee
- Children: 3
- Presenting career
- Show: The Doc Thompson Show, The Morning Blaze, Doc Thompson's Daily Mojo with Doc and Brad, Doc's Eats and Treats
- Stations: WRVA, WLW, TheBlaze, MoJo 5.0, Spoony Radio
- Style: Talk radio
- Country: United States

Michael 'Doc' Thompson (May 6, 1969 – February 5, 2019) was an American political commentator and radio personality.

== Career ==
Thompson was a conservative-libertarian who, after at stint at WMJI 105.7 in Cleveland in the mid-2000s, hosted The Doc Thompson Show on numerous talk radio stations around the United States, including WRVA in Richmond, Virginia from 2007 to 2012 and WLW in Cincinnati, Ohio from 2010 to 2012. He hosted The Morning Blaze with Doc Thompson on TheBlaze Radio Network beginning in 2013, and commuted to TheBlaze's headquarters in Dallas, Texas from his home in Bentonville, Arkansas to host the show. He left TheBlaze in 2018 to start Mojo 5.0, a libertarian-focused online radio network, where he hosted "Doc Thompson's Daily Mojo".

== Personal life and death ==
Thompson was married to Yuna Lee, a television anchor who has worked for WHIO-TV in Dayton, Ohio and KHBS in Fort Smith, Arkansas. He had three children.

On February 5, 2019, Thompson was killed after being struck by an Amtrak train while jogging near train tracks in Haltom City, Texas.
