= A Patriot's History of the United States =

2004 book by L. Schweikart and M. Allen

- First edition
- Author: Michael Allen, Larry Schweikart
- Language: English
- Subject: U.S. History
- Publisher: Sentinel HC
- Publication date: December 29, 2004 (Hardcover), February 27, 2007 (Paperback)
- Publication place: United States
- Media type: Print (Hardcover, Paperback)
- Pages: 944
- ISBN: 1-59523-001-7
- OCLC: 55105371
- Dewey Decimal: 973 22
- LC Class: E178.1 .S3795 2004

A Patriot's History of the United States: From Columbus's Great Discovery to the War on Terror is a 2004 nonfiction book (updated in 2014) on American history by Larry Schweikart and Michael Allen. Written from a conservative standpoint, it is a counterpoint to Howard Zinn's A People's History of the United States and asserts that the United States is an "overwhelmingly positive" force for good in the world. Schweikart said that he wrote it with Allen because he could not find an American history textbook without "leftist bias".

== Overview ==
=== European discovery to the formation of a Constitutional nation ===
Chapter 1, “The City on the Hill, 1492-1707”, covers The Age of European Discovery, through early European colonization of the Americas.

Chapter 2, “Colonial Adolescence, 1707-63”, covers the later colonial history of the United States, through the French and Indian War and its financial demands on King George III’s early reign of Great Britain.

Chapter 3, “Colonies No More, 1763-83”, covers the prelude of the American Revolution, starting with the Proclamation of 1763, through the events of the war, ending with the Treaty of Paris.

Chapter 4, “A Nation of Law, 1776-89”, covers the politics of establishing a legal basis of government, starting with the Declaration of Independence, through the ratification of the Constitution and the Bill of Rights.

=== Washington’s Presidency to the crisis of the Union ===
Chapter 5, “Small Republic, Big Shoulders, 1789-1815”, covers the presidency of George Washington, through the War of 1812.

Chapter 6, “The First Era of Big Central Government, 1815-36”, covers the financial aftermath of the War of 1812, through the presidency of Andrew Jackson.

Chapter 7, “Red Foxes and Bear Flags, 1836-48”, covers the presidency of Martin Van Buren, through the Mexican-American War and the start of the California gold rush.

Chapter 8, “The House Dividing, 1848-60”, covers John Brown's raid on Harpers Ferry, through the election of Abraham Lincoln.

Chapter 9, “The Crisis of the Union, 1860-65”, covers the origins of the American Civil War, through the major battles and events of the American Civil War, up to the assassination of Abraham Lincoln.

=== Reconstruction to the Great Crash ===
Chapter 10, “Ideals and Realities of Reconstruction, 1865-76”, covers the presidency of Andrew Johnson and Reconstruction, through the election of Rutherford B. Hayes and the Compromise of 1877.

Chapter 11, “Lighting Out for the Territories, 1861-90”, covers the history of wagon trains on the Oregon Trail and the Pony Express, through the growth of Populism in the late nineteenth-century United States.

Chapter 12, “Sinews of Democracy, 1876-96”, covers post-Reconstruction topics including the presidency of Rutherford B. Hayes and the Great Railway Strike, through the election of William McKinley.

Chapter 13, “‘Building Best, Building Greatly’, 1896-1912”, covers events during the presidency of William McKinley and presidency of Theodore Roosevelt, through the presidency of William Howard Taft and election of Woodrow Wilson.

Chapter 14, “War, Wilson, and Internationalism, 1912-20”, covers the presidency of Woodrow Wilson and U.S. intervention in World War I, through the passage of the Nineteenth Amendment and the election of Warren G. Harding.

Chapter 15, “The Roaring Twenties and the Great Crash, 1920-32”, covers the Roaring Twenties, through the Great Crash, the presidency of Herbert Hoover, and the election of Franklin D. Roosevelt.

=== The New Deal to the 21st Century ===
Chapter 16, “Enlarging the Public Sector, 1932-40”, covers the first half of the presidency of Franklin D. Roosevelt, particularly his New Deal initiatives, through the Attack on Pearl Harbor.

Chapter 17, “Democracy’s Finest Hour, 1941-45”, covers the United States’ intervention in World War II, through the development of the atomic bomb in the Manhattan Project and the bombings of Hiroshima and Nagasaki.

Chapter 18, “America’s ‘Happy Days,’ 1946-59”, covers the presidency of Harry Truman and the creation of the Iron Curtain, through the presidency of Dwight D. Eisenhower and early events in the Civil Rights movement.

Chapter 19, “The Age of Upheaval, 1960-74”, covers the election of John F. Kennedy and the Cuban Missile Crisis, through the Watergate scandal and the resignation of Richard Nixon.

Chapter 20, “Retreat and Resurrection, 1974-88”, covers the presidency of Gerald Ford and presidency of Jimmy Carter, through the presidency of Ronald Reagan and the Fall of the Berlin Wall.

Chapter 21, “The Moral Crossroads, 1989-2000”, covers the presidency of George H. W. Bush, through the presidency of Bill Clinton.

Chapter 22, “America, World Leader, 2000 and Beyond”, covers the election of George W. Bush and the September 11 attacks, through the beginnings of the war on terror and Hurricane Katrina.

== Reception ==
Larry Schweikart recounted to Steve Bannon that the book had respectable sales for several years after publication, but rocketed up the best seller charts in 2010 after being recommended by talk-show host Glenn Beck, hitting #1 on the New York Times and Amazon.com bestseller lists.

In a review in the conservative magazine National Review, Matthew Spalding of The Heritage Foundation wrote: "A Patriot's History rejects the economic determinism of Beard and Zinn, and others who 'wrongly assume that people were (and are) incapable of acting outside of self-interest.'" Spalding continued: "The rejected assumption, which is the foundation of A Patriot's History, is that there are principles and purposes reflected in American history that make this imperfect country worthy of our affection, and that honest history should explain those principles and illustrate those purposes as the centerpiece of our nation's story."

Writing in the Claremont Review of Books, David J. Bobb praised the book as a fine teaching tool, stating that every page of the book is "full of statements that would make Zinn snarl" and that it "gives students an example of honest historical inquiry.

The book faced criticism, as well. Reviewing the book in the journal The History Teacher, David Hoogland Noon found that the book shows "ignorance of the basic parameters of actual historical scholarship", for instance "a single paragraph to the Japanese internment while squandering an entire page with denunciations of liberal historians and their treatments of the subject". Moreover, according to Noon, "the authors make claims that are not even remotely endorsed by the footnoted sources."

New York Times book review editor Barry Gewen called A Patriot's History "a frankly nationalistic—often blatantly partisan—text in which the United States is presented as having a duty to lead while other countries, apparently, have an obligation to follow".

Criticizing the book from a conservative perspective, Paul Gottfried in The American Conservative characterized A Patriot's History as historiography: "...many of the views that this patriotic historian considers far leftist are actually those of the Old Right... [The] broad area of agreement about heroes and villains—and about how we reached the glorious present by overcoming the prejudices of the past—unites the liberal and patriotic versions of American history. This is the new consensus history, and it leaves little room for the Old Right's take on the past to get a fair hearing."

In his review of the book in The Wall Street Journal, Brendan Miniter called a Patriot's History a "fluent account of America from the discovery of the Continent up to the present day", and wrote that the book serves to "remind us what a few good individuals can do in just a few short centuries."

John Coleman reviewing the book in the Institute for Humane Studies, praised it as "thorough and easy to read" and stated:

The packaging of the book would have benefited from editorial restraint in a few key areas, but overall, the work is a model of balance, and it stays true to the first principles outlined so clearly by the authors in the introduction defending, one might say, 'truth, justice, and the American way.' In addition, for every fault in A Patriot's History, there are a thousand pleasant surprises and heartening reminders that underneath it all America remains a country of ideas, ideals, and optimism and no amount of revisionism can take that legacy away.

== Current editions ==
- Schweikart, Larry; Allen, Michael (2014). A Patriot's History of the United States: From Columbus's Great Discovery to America's Age of Entitlement, Revised Edition. Sentinel. ISBN 978-1-59523-115-4.
- Schweikart, Larry; Allen, Michael (2007). A Patriot's History of the United States: From Columbus's Great Discovery to the War on Terror. Sentinel. ISBN 978-1-59523-032-4.
- Schweikart, Larry; Allen, Michael (2004). A Patriot's History of the United States: From Columbus's Great Discovery to the War on Terror. Sentinel. ISBN 1-59523-001-7.
