= Frederick Carrick =

Canadian chiropractor (born 1952)

Frederick R. Carrick
- Born: February 26, 1952 (age 74); Toronto, Ontario
- Education: Canadian Memorial Chiropractic College, 1979; Walden University, 1996
- Occupations: Senior research fellow and founder of the Carrick Institute for Graduate Studies
- Known for: Establishing the chiropractic neurology subspeciality

Frederick Robert "Ted" Carrick (born February 26, 1952) is a Canadian-born clinician, educator, and researcher known for developing the field of functional neurology. He is the founder of the Carrick Institute and has held academic appointments in neurology and neuroscience-related disciplines at institutions, including the University of Central Florida College of Medicine where he is a Professor of Neurology. His work has focused on neurorehabilitation, movement disorders, traumatic brain injury, vestibular disorders, and sports concussion.

He has treated athletes with concussion-related disorders, including National Hockey League players such as Sidney Crosby and Jonathan Toews.

== Early life, education and career ==
Born in Toronto and raised in Calgary, Edmonton, Winnipeg, and other locations related to his father's military service, Carrick earned a doctor of chiropractic from Canadian Memorial Chiropractic College in 1979 and a PhD in education from Walden University in 1996. His doctoral dissertation "Neurophysiological Implications in Learning" (AAT 9713635) claimed a relationship between clinical neurophysiology and education.

Carrick also graduated from the Harvard Medical School Global Clinical Scholars Program with distinction in 2014 and has a Master of Science in Health Professions Education (MS-HPEd) 2017 from Mass General Brigham University of Health Professions.

== Career ==
In 1979, Carrick founded the Carrick Institute, an educational organization dedicated to postgraduate training in clinical neuroscience and functional neurology. The institute has trained healthcare professionals from multiple disciplines, including chiropractors, physicians, physical therapists, and other rehabilitation specialists.

Carrick has lectured internationally and has taught clinicians throughout North America, Europe, Asia, Australia, South America, and Africa. His lectures and continuing education programs have focused on clinical neuroscience, neurorehabilitation, vestibular disorders, concussion management, and brain injury.

=== Academic appointments ===
Carrick has held faculty and research appointments at several institutions. He has served as Professor of Neurology at the University of Central Florida College of Medicine, Adjunct Professor at the MGH Institute of Health Professions in Boston, and Senior Research Fellow at the Centre for Mental Health Research associated with the University of Cambridge.

His research interests have included traumatic brain injury, sports concussion, movement disorders, vestibular rehabilitation, neuroplasticity, and medical education.

Carrick received the title of Distinguished Post Graduate Professor of Neurology from Logan University in Chesterfield, Missouri, Professor Emeritus of Neurology Parker University in Dallas, Texas, and Distinguished Professor of Neurology Life University in Marietta, Georgia.

=== Concussion and brain injury research ===
Carrick's work has focused on concussion and traumatic brain injury. Beginning in the 1979 and continuing through the 21st century, he developed rehabilitation programs incorporating vestibular stimulation, eye-movement training, balance therapy, sensory integration techniques, and other non-pharmacological interventions.

Carrick's work received public attention following his involvement in the treatment of National Hockey League player Sidney Crosby after Crosby sustained a series of concussions in 2011. Crosby subsequently returned to professional competition. Carrick has also worked with Olympic athletes and professional hockey and football players receiving treatment for neurological injuries.

== Research ==
Carrick has published research on traumatic brain injury, concussion, stroke rehabilitation, vestibular disorders, movement disorders, neuroplasticity, and neuroscience education. His publications have appeared in peer-reviewed scientific journals and have examined both clinical interventions and theoretical aspects of neurological rehabilitation.

In collaboration with researchers at the University of Central Florida College of Medicine, Carrick has participated in studies investigating neurodegenerative disease, traumatic brain injury, stem-cell biology, and novel therapeutic technologies. In 2023, he co-authored research exploring the effects of ceramic far-infrared technology in animal models of Parkinson's disease, reporting improvements in motor function and increases in neuronal cell populations.

Media appearances

In 2001, the Public Broadcasting Service (PBS) featured his clinical work in Waking Up the Brain: Amazing Adjustments, part of the Body & Soul television series. The program examined his treatment approaches for patients with neurological disorders.

His work has also been covered by ABC News' Nightline, the Canadian Broadcasting Corporation, Maclean's, and numerous sports and health-related media outlets.
