= The Glenn Beck Program =

Television program

- Title card
- Starring: Glenn Beck
- Country of origin: United States

Production
- Production location: Dallas
- Running time: 60 minutes
- Production company: Mercury Radio Arts

Original release
- Network: HLN
- Release: May 8, 2006 – October 16, 2008
- Network: Fox News
- Release: January 19, 2009 – June 30, 2011
- Network: TheBlaze
- Release: December 15, 2011 – December 17, 2025

Glenn (previously titled The Glenn Beck Program) is a news talk and political opinion show on TheBlaze hosted by Glenn Beck. It is produced and recorded at TheBlaze studios in Dallas, TX. The show originally ran on CNN Headline News from 2006 to 2008 (now HLN) and moved to the Fox News Channel in 2009. Beck's program departed Fox News on June 30, 2011, with Beck announcing the creation of an online only network, later to become TheBlaze, that would air his television show among other programming.

== Overview ==
Each broadcast usually began with a brief, scripted monologue by Beck, in which he gave his analysis of the top story of the day. This was usually followed by an interview with a correspondent, who continued the discussion with his or her opinions on the matter.

Although the original concept of the show combined elements of late-night talk shows (e.g., satirical comedy bits and frequent celebrity interviews) and cable news, it gradually came to center on the latter format and to use a more news-oriented style.

== Headline News era ==
The Friday broadcasts were devoted to a full-hour interview under the label Honest Questions. People interviewed included Ron Paul, Al Sharpton, Janice Dickinson, Larry King, Nancy Grace, Benjamin Netanyahu, Anderson Cooper, Jeff Foxworthy, and Ben Stein.

=== Special programs ===
Special programming included Exposed: The Extremist Agenda, Exposed: The Climate of Fear, and a week-long series titled America's Addiction. These programs tended to be serious examinations of the subjects without any of Beck's humorous asides.

==== Exposed: The Extremist Agenda ====
The Extremist Agenda, a special about Islamic extremism, aired in November 2006.

==== Exposed: The Climate of Fear ====
The May 2, 2007 edition of his Glenn Beck on Headline News was a "special report" entitled, "Exposed: The Climate of Fear". In his opening remarks, Beck said, "Welcome to 'Exposed: The Climate of Fear.' I want you to know right up front, this is not a balanced look at global warming. It is the other side of the climate debate that you don't hear anywhere. Yes, Al Gore, there is another credible side." Media Matters for America described it as "Glenn Beck's Climate of Distortion" which "rehashed several falsehoods and misleading talking points", including the claim that the so-called Oregon Petition had credibility.

==== Exposed: America's Broke ====
Beck aired a special called "Exposed: America's Broke" during the week on September 18, 2008. This special dealt with the national debt in America and what Beck saw as America's lack of competent leadership.

==== Exposed: The End of Oil ====
This last Exposed special hosted by Beck aired the week after America's Broke and focused on the economic effects of not using the resources in America (offshore drilling, ANWR oil, etc.) before the U.S. can find an alternative source of fuel.

== Fox News era ==
Glenn Beck's self-titled television show on Fox News Channel premiered January 19, 2009, with his move resulting in a significant viewership increase. Beck's format included the use of diagrams and visual aids, most notably a rolling chalkboard. His program typically began with a 15–20 minute monologue.

His last show on Fox News aired on June 30, 2011. During the last episode, Beck recounted the accomplishments of the show and the topics it discussed.

=== Criticism of White House officials ===
==== Van Jones ====
Van Jones resigned from his position as Special Advisor to the president in September 2009 after becoming a major subject of news stories on programs such as Glenn Beck, after lesser known conservative groups had first aired concerns as early as April. The early critics received coverage from Fox News, notably from Fox commentator Glenn Beck, who featured Jones on 14 episodes of his show. They forced Van Jones in July and August 2009 to defend his past including membership in a socialist group and support for Mumia Abu-Jamal, a death row prisoner convicted of killing a police officer. Editors credited Beck with his "first scalp", noting that the Huffington Post expressed continued support for Jones, singling out the efforts of Beck to force his resignation, though Beck was not the first to voice concerns about the appointment nor did he call for Jones' resignation.

==== Anita Dunn ====
Anita Dunn, as interim White House Communications Director, made critical statements of Fox News. Following her statements, Beck aired a clip, from June 5, 2009, of Dunn giving a speech to high school students. She stated "two of my favorite political philosophers, Mao Zedong and Mother Teresa – not often coupled with each other – but the two people that I turn to most to basically deliver a simple point, which is, 'You're going to make choices, you're going to challenge, you're going to say, why not?, you're going to figure out how to do things that have never been done before." Beck was critical of Dunn as he questioned what he alleged was a pattern of communist sympathy.

=== ACORN ===
Within days of its premiere, Beck began using his program on Fox News to warn the public about the Association of Community Organizations for Reform Now (ACORN).

In September 2009, the website BigGovernment published heavily edited hidden-camera recordings, although the full video recordings were also made available, in which Hannah Giles posed as a prostitute and James O'Keefe posed as her boyfriend in order to elicit sympathy and responses from employees of ACORN. The day of their release, the videos were also aired on Glenn Beck. After the release of the first video, Beck began to devote large portions of his program to publicizing the alleged "underhanded dealings" of ACORN. The story immediately had a disparaging effect on the organization, with one reporter from the New York Times proclaiming that the videos "caught ACORN's low-level employees in five cities sounding eager to assist with tax evasion, human smuggling and child prostitution." Politicians quickly distanced themselves from the organization, and within days both the United States House and Senate voted to exclude ACORN from federal funding, (although funding was later restored after the group had disbanded as a result of a court order finding that the congressional action violated the U.S. Constitution's bill of attainder clause). On 13 August 2010, the United States Court of Appeals for the Second Circuit reversed and remanded on the grounds that only 10 percent of ACORN's funding was federal and that did not constitute "punishment". The organization was forced to disband amid the firestorm of controversy due to lack of funding.

Subsequent independent investigations by multiple law enforcement agencies including state attorneys general and district attorneys determined that the ACORN workers had committed no criminal activity and that the videos were actually "heavily edited" to present material out of context and create a misleading impression of activities.

=== The Revolutionary Holocaust ===
On Friday, January 22, 2010, Beck produced his first documentary, The Revolutionary Holocaust: Live Free or Die.

== Reception ==
Beck's Fox News show intersperses history with weeping laments, melodramatic calls to faith and vehement attacks on 'progressives.' He also mixes in campy stage props and laughs straight from the Morning Zoo playbook. One moment, he is giving an impassioned plea for the would-be builder of Park51 to build elsewhere; the next moment, he is discussing possible names for a hypothetical Islam-friendly gay bar next door (such as) 'Turban Cowboy', (or) 'You Mecca Me Hot.'

— The New York Times Magazine

Beck's shows have been described as a "mix of moral lessons, outrage and an apocalyptic view of the future ... capturing the feelings of an alienated class of Americans." Beck has referred to himself as an entertainer, a rodeo clown, and identified with Howard Beale: "When he came out of the rain and he was like, none of this makes any sense. I am that guy."

Beck's style of expressing his candid opinions have helped make his shows successful, but have also resulted in protest and advertiser boycotts. In late July 2009, Beck argued that reparations and social justice were driving President Obama's agenda, discussing issues of diversity and institutional racism. That week in response to the Henry Gates controversy, Beck stated that Obama has repeatedly exposed himself as having, "a deep-seated hatred for white people, or the white culture." He concluded that, "I'm not saying he doesn't like white people. I'm saying he has a problem. This guy is, I believe, a racist." These remarks drew criticism from MSNBC commentators, the NAACP, and resulted in as many as 80 advertisers boycotting both Beck's show and FNC. Beck later mentioned that he regretted calling Barack Obama a racist, saying that, "I have a big fat mouth sometimes".

Time describes Beck as "the new populist superstar of Fox News" saying it is easier to see a set of attitudes rather than a specific ideology, noting his criticism of Wall Street, yet defending bonuses to AIG and denouncing conspiracies against FEMA but warning against indoctrination of children by the AmeriCorps program. Time concludes that "what unites Beck's disparate themes is a sense of siege" but notes that Beck describes his Glenn Beck Radio Program as "the fusion of entertainment and enlightenment."

According to Nielsen ratings, Beck had one of the highest rated 5PM cable news shows as of March 2009, consistently beating his competition's combined total viewership. Beck was up 96% in 2009, from Fox's previous year 5 p.m. time slot. However, the show's ratings for the month of January 2011 were 39% lower than their January 2010 number, representing the steepest decline of any cable news show. A significant factor in Beck's overall ratings drop is his viewership among the prized 25- to 54-year-old advertising demographic, which declined by almost one-half in 2010.

=== Boycotts ===
After Beck accused President Obama of being a racist, Color of Change, an online civil rights advocacy group, urged advertisers to boycott Beck's program. As of September 21, 2010, a total of 296 advertisers had asked that their commercials not be shown on Fox News during Beck's programming including Wal-Mart, CVS Caremark, Best Buy, Ally Financial, Travelocity, LexisNexis-owned Lawyers.com, Procter & Gamble, Verizon Wireless, HSBC, Progressive Corporation and GEICO. Fox News has also had a difficult time selling commercials on The O'Reilly Factor and Fox and Friends when Beck appears as a guest on those shows as well as other Fox News shows. In the TV sales world Beck's show has become known as "empty calories," meaning that he draws great ratings, but he's toxic for ad sales. Fox issued a statement indicating that overall revenue had not been lost as a result of the boycott, as most companies had shifted to other Fox programs. UPS Stores has decided to temporarily stop advertising on Fox News as a whole. Beck said that he was unapologetic for the remark and stated that the President is not above criticism.

=== In pop culture ===
In the South Park episode "Dances with Smurfs," Eric Cartman parodies Beck multiple times, particularly when Cartman repeatedly says, "I'm just asking questions," a Glenn Beck catchphrase. His show's intro and set are similar to Beck's. On the November 16 show, Beck acknowledged the parody, noting the use of chalkboards, crying on TV and questioning the President, saying, "You haven't lived until South Park has done an entire episode on you."

== TheBlaze era ==
On December 15, 2011, Beck moved his family and TheBlaze TV broadcasting from New York City to a suburb of Dallas, Texas, Las Colinas.

Preceded by America's News Headquarters	Fox News Channel Weekday Lineup; 5:00 p.m. – 6:00 p.m.	Succeeded by The Five
