= Larry Schweikart =

American historian

- Born: Larry Earl Schweikart; April 21, 1951 (age 75); Mesa, Arizona, U.S.
- Education: Arizona State University (BA, MA); University of California, Santa Barbara (PhD)
- Occupations: Historian, academic

Larry Earl Schweikart (/ˈʃwaɪkərt/; born April 21, 1951) is an American historian and retired professor of history at the University of Dayton. During the 1980s and 1990s, he authored numerous scholarly publications. In recent years, he has authored popular books, including A Patriot's History of the United States (2004) and 48 Liberal Lies About American History. According to professors Guy Burton and Ted Goertzel, "Schweikart and Allen are both history professors with distinguished publication records."

== Early life and education ==
Schweikart was born in 1951 in Mesa, Arizona to a cattle ranching family and lived in Higley until his father Earl died in 1960. After his father's death, Larry and his mother moved to a house in Chandler, Arizona, that Earl had already purchased.

Beginning in high school, Schweikart played drums for rock bands, even though he could not read music. Schweikart graduated from Chandler High School in 1968 and Arizona State University in 1972 with a B.A. in political science. As he recounted his undergraduate years: "The whole time I was racing cars and playing rock 'n roll music and paid no attention to my grades."

From 1975 to 1976, Schweikart performed for the band Rampage, which opened for Steppenwolf among others. Rampage also released a single, "Didn't Want to Have to Say Goodbye to You", that was praised by Record World.

In 1977, exhausted by the travel schedule with Rampage, Schweikart returned to Arizona, became a middle school English teacher in Eloy, and enrolled in graduate school at Arizona State. Schweikart continued playing drums at nightclubs during his graduate school years. At Arizona State, Schweikart wrote a national Phi Alpha Theta prize-winning article on the Peary diaries and wrote a pamphlet on the history of banking in Arizona. He received his M.A. in History in 1980. Schweikart also retired from drumming in 1980, concerned about possible hearing loss.

He then received a Ph.D. in History from the University of California, Santa Barbara in 1983. His doctoral dissertation was Banking in the American South, 1836-1865.

== Career ==
Schweikart took a one-year position at the University of Wisconsin–Platteville Richland in 1984 as instructor in U.S. history, focusing on business history. In 1985, he became an associate professor at the University of Dayton, earning a promotion to full professor in 1995. At Dayton, Schweikart taught courses on the Civil War and economic, business, and military history in the U.S. He was awarded the University of Dayton Alumni Award for Scholarship for the 1988–89 academic year. Schweikart retired in 2016.

In 1999 he published a history of American business, The Entrepreneurial Adventure. In 2004 he co-authored the book A Patriot's History of the United States with Michael Allen. In 2006, he published America's Victories. In 2006, he published 48 Liberal Lies About American History.

Schweikart is active on Twitter, operating under various accounts and commenting on political matters, sometimes engaging in arguments with other users. During the 2018 United States elections, he claimed that then-Congressman Beto O'Rourke was sending busloads of illegal immigrants to polling booths and paying them $100 to vote.

In December 2020, President Donald Trump appointed Schweikart to the Board of Directors of the National Board for Education Sciences, which advises leaders of the Department of Education's research division.

== Bibliography ==
=== Scholarly books ===
- California Bankers (New York: Simon & Schuster, 1994).
- Banking in the American West from Gold Rush to Deregulation (co-authored with Lynne Doti) (University of Oklahoma Press, 1991).
- Making Change: South Carolina Banking in the Twentieth Century (co-authored with John G. Sproat) (Columbia, S.C.: Bruccoli Clark Layman, 1990).
- Banking in the American South from the Age of Jackson to Reconstruction (Louisiana State University Press, 1987).
- Trident (with D.D. Dalgleish) (Southern Illinois University Press, 1984).
- Banking in the West: A Collection of Essays (Editor) (Sunflower University Press, 1984).
- History of Banking in Arizona (University of Arizona Press, 1982).

=== Textbooks and general reference books ===
- Schweikart, Larry, and Bradley J. Birzer. The American West. (Wiley Desk Reference" series, ) Hoboken, N.J.: John Wiley & Sons, 2003. ISBN 9780471401384
- The Entrepreneurial Adventure: A History of American Enterprise (Ft. Worth, Texas: Harcourt Brace, 1999) (textbook)

=== Books edited ===
- Encyclopedia of American Business History: Banking and Finance, to 1913 editor in chief (New York: Facts on File, 1990)
- Encyclopedia of American Business History: Banking and Finance, 1913-1989 editor in chief (New York: Facts on File, 1990)
- Voices of UD:Historical Interpretations of the University of Dayton, ed. and principal author (Dayton, Ohio: University of Dayton, 1999).

=== Peer-reviewed journal articles (selected) ===
- “From Hard Money to Branch Banking: California Banking in the Gold Rush Economy,” with Lynne Pierson Doti, in James Rawls and Richard J. Orsi, eds., "A Golden State: Mining and Economic Development in Gold Rush California," special edition of California History, Winter 1998–99, 209–232.
- “The Panic of 1857: Causes, Transmission, and Containment” (co-authored with Charles Calomiris), Journal of Economic History, LI, December 1990, pp. 807–34.
- “A New Perspective on George Wingfield and Nevada Banking, 1920-33,” Nevada Historical Quarterly, XXXV, vol. 35, Winter 1992, pp. 162–76.
- “American Commercial Banking: A Bibliographic Survey,” Business History Review, vol. 65, Fall 1992, pp. 606–61.
- “Alabama’s Antebellum Banks: New Interpretations, New Evidence,” The Alabama Review, XXXVIII, June 1985, pp. 202–21.
- “Secession and Southern Banks,” Civil War History, XXXI, June 1985, pp. 111–25.
- “Tennessee’s Antebellum Banks, Part I,” Tennessee Historical Quarterly, XLV, Summer 1986, pp. 119–32.
- “Southern Banking and Economic Growth in the Antebellum Period: A Reassessment,” Journal of Southern History, LIII, February 1987, pp. 19–36.
- “Private Bankers in the Antebellum South,” Southern Studies, XXV, Summer 1986, pp. 125–34.
- “Jacksonian Ideology, Currency Control, and `Central Banking’: A Reappraisal,” The Historian, LI, November 1988, pp. 781-02.
- “Banking in Early New Mexico from the Civil War to the Roaring Twenties,” New Mexico Historical Review, LXIII, January 1988, pp. 1–22.
- “Financing the Postwar Housing Boom in Phoenix and Los Angeles, 1945-60" (co-authored with Lynne Doti), Pacific Historical Review, LVIII, May 1989, pp. 173–94.
- “Collusion or Competition: Another Look at Arizona Banking in the Postwar Period, 1950-1964,” Journal of Arizona History, XXVIII, Summer 1987, pp. 189–200.
- “You Count It: The Birth of Banking in Arizona,” Journal of Arizona History, XXII, Fall 1981, pp. 349–68.
- “Brophy vs. Douglas: A Case Study in Frontier Corporate Control,” Journal of the West, XXIII, April 1984, pp. 49–55.
- “Antebellum Banking in Arkansas: New Evidence, New Interpretations,” Southern Studies, XXVI, Fall 1987, pp. 188–201.
- “Financing Urban Growth: Entrepreneurial Creativity and Western Cities, 1945-75,” Urban Studies, XXVI, February 1990, pp. 177–86.
- “Polar Revisionism and the Peary Claim: The Diary of Robert E. Peary,” The Historian, XLVIII, May 1986, pp. 341–58.
- “Stand By to Repel Historians: Modern Scholarship and Caribbean Pirates, 1650-1725"” (co-authored with Richard Burg), The Historian, XLVI, March 1984, pp. 219–34.

=== Book chapters (selected) ===
- “Banking and Finance in North America, 1607-1996,” in Alice Teichova et al., eds, Banking, Trade, and Industry (Cambridge University Press, 1997), 297–314.
- “Entrepreneurial Aspects of Antebellum Banking,” in American Business History: Case Studies ed. C. Joseph Pusateri and Henry Dethloff (New York: Harlan Davidson, 1987), pp. 122–39.

=== Popular books ===
- Schweikart, Larry (March 15, 2022). Dragonslayers. Bombardier Books. ISBN 978-1-63758-188-9.
- Schweikart, Larry (2019). Reagan: The American President. New York: Post Hill Press. ISBN 9781642930825.
- Schweikart, Larry; Dougherty, Dave (2017). The Politically Incorrect Guide to the American Revolution. Washington, D.C.: Regnery Publishing. ISBN 9781621576259.
- Schweikart, Larry; Pollak, Joel (2017). How Trump Won: The Inside Story of a Revolution. Washington, D.C.: Regnery Publishing. ISBN 9781621573951.
- Schweikart, Larry (2017). The Politically Incorrect Guide to the Presidents, Part 1: From Washington to Taft. Washington, D.C.: Regnery Publishing. ISBN 9781621575245. OCLC 945232389.
- Schweikart, Larry, and Dave Dougherty. A Patriot's History of the Modern World, Vol. II: From the Cold War to the Age of Entitlement, 1945-2012. New York: Sentinel; 2013 ISBN 9781595231048.
- Schweikart, Larry, and Dave Dougherty. A Patriot's History of the Modern World, Vol. I: From America's Exceptional Ascent to the Atomic Bomb, 1898-1945. New York: Sentinel; 2012 ISBN 9781595230898.
- Schweikart, Larry, Dave Dougherty, Michael Allen, and Larry Schweikart. The Patriot's History Reader: Essential Documents for Every American. New York: Sentinel, 2011. ISBN 9781595230782
- Schweikart, Larry. What Would the Founders Say?: A Patriot's Answers to America's Most Pressing Problems. New York: Sentinel, 2011. ISBN 9781595230744
- Schweikart, Larry. Seven Events That Made America America: And Proved That the Founding Fathers Were Right All Along. New York: Sentinel, 2010.ISBN 9781595230645
- Schweikart, Larry, and Lynne Pierson Doti. American Entrepreneur: The Fascinating Stories of the People Who Defined Business in the United States. New York: AMACOM, American Management Association, 2010. ISBN 9780814414118
- Schweikart, Larry. 48 Liberal Lies About American History: (That You Probably Learned in School). New York: Sentinel, 2008. ISBN 9781595230515.
- Schweikart, Larry. America's Victories: Why the U.S. Wins Wars and Will Win the War on Terror. New York: Sentinel, 2006. ISBN 9781595230218.
- Schweikart, Larry, and Michael Allen. A Patriot's History of the United States: From Columbus's Great Discovery to the War on Terror. New York: Sentinel, 2004. ISBN 9781595230010.
