= Blaze Media =

American conservative media company

- Country: United States
- Broadcast area: United States
- Headquarters: Irving, Texas

Programming
- Language: English
- Picture format: 1080i HDTV (downscaled to letterboxed 480i for the SDTV feed)

Ownership
- Owner: Mercury Radio Arts
- Parent: Blaze Media LLC

History
- Launched: December 3, 2018

Links
- Webcast: blazetv.com
- Website: theblaze.com

Mercury Radio Arts
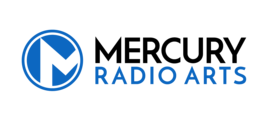
- Type: Private
- Industry: Multimedia production; Digital media; Real estate
- Founded: 2002
- Founder: Glenn Beck
- Headquarters: Irving, Texas, United States
- Subsidiaries: Blaze Media LLC; Mercury Ink; Mercury Real Estate Services, LLC
- Website: www.mercuryradioarts.com

Blaze Live
- Country: United States
- Broadcast area: United States
- Headquarters: Irving, Texas

Programming
- Language: English
- Picture format: 1080p

Ownership
- Owner: Blaze Media

History
- Launched: July 8, 2020

Links
- Webcast: eu-landing.corp.pluto.tv

Blaze Media is an American conservative media company owned by Mercury Radio Arts, a multimedia production company owned by conservative radio talk host Glenn Beck. It was founded in 2018 as a result of a merger between TheBlaze and CRTV LLC. The company's leadership consists of CEO Tyler Cardon. It is based in Irving, Texas, where it has studios and offices, as well as in Washington, D.C.

TheBlaze was a pay television network founded by Glenn Beck. Originally, it was called Glenn Beck TV, created after Beck's departure from Fox News Channel in 2011. In 2012, the network took the name of Beck's popular website, TheBlaze. From 2014 to 2017, the company had four different CEOs, followed by Beck himself. Months after Beck took the position, the company laid off over a fourth of its staff. CRTV LLC, which operated the Conservative Review and CRTV (Conservative Review Television), was an online subscription network.

== History ==
On August 31, 2010, three days after his Restoring Honor rally at the Lincoln Memorial in Washington, D.C., conservative political commentator Glenn Beck launched the TheBlaze website, describing it as an alternative to "mainstream media outlets". TheBlaze headquarters are located in Irving, Texas, at the Mercury Studios (formerly the Studios at Las Colinas).

Beck announced the creation of an online-only network replacing Insider Extreme as a result of his Fox News departure on June 7, 2011. On September 12, 2011, Beck launched GBTV (Glenn Beck TV) as an exclusive internet streaming network, produced and operated by Mercury Radio Arts. GBTV would air a television adaptation of his radio show, his television show, and other original programming, including Real News from TheBlaze, a nightly news program hosted by former CNN personality Amy Holmes. On June 18, 2012, Mercury Radio Arts announced the consolidation of all of its outlets under the "TheBlaze" brand, thus renaming the internet television station from GBTV to TheBlaze.

In 2012, Dish Network placed TheBlaze on its channel lineup. As a result of the "Get TheBlaze" campaign (a movement led by supporters to have other supporters call their cable or satellite television provider and ask them to carry the channel), several smaller, regional cable operators also have recently picked up TheBlaze—including Cablevision (also known as Optimum TV – Channel 828), a major cable provider in the New York metropolitan area.

Betsy Morgan was named CEO of TheBlaze on December 9, 2014, replacing Chris Balfe, who had been CEO since the beginning. Morgan left the company in June 2015. Chief Revenue Officer Kraig Kitchin replaced Morgan until he resigned in January 2016, taking the position of Interim Head of Sales and being replaced by Stewart Padveen, a digital startup entrepreneur, who resigned in February 2017. Beck took over as CEO of the company in May 2017.

In November 2015, Beck sent an open letter to the Republican National Committee, requesting permission for TheBlaze to host a Republican presidential debate; this offer was not accepted.

TheBlaze was dropped by Cablevision on August 31, 2016. A year later, on August 31, 2017, TheBlaze laid off nearly 60 employees, which cut its personnel by almost 30%.

On December 28, 2018, Verizon Fios removed TheBlaze from its lineup. TheBlaze is available as Blaze Live on ad-supported streaming service Pluto TV with 24 hours a day programming.

=== Merger with CRTV ===
On December 3, 2018, TheBlaze Inc. television arm merged with CRTV LLC, combining resources, personalities, personnel, subscribers, and programming. The merged entity, named Blaze Media, retained TheBlaze's channel slot and incorporated two of CRTV's programs into the channel's schedule (Steve Deace Show and Wilkow!).

Gavin McInnes, the co-founder of Vice Media and Vice magazine and founder of the far-right organization Proud Boys, was expected to host his programs Get Off My Lawn and CRTV Tonight for the new company, whose co-president, Gaston Mooney, called McInnes "a comedian and provocateur, one of the many varied voices and viewpoints on Blaze Media platforms." Less than a week after the merger, however, it was announced that McInnes was no longer associated with Blaze Media, with no details given as to why. Former contributor Michelle Malkin likewise followed McInnes out the door after CRTV's merger with TheBlaze in December 2018.

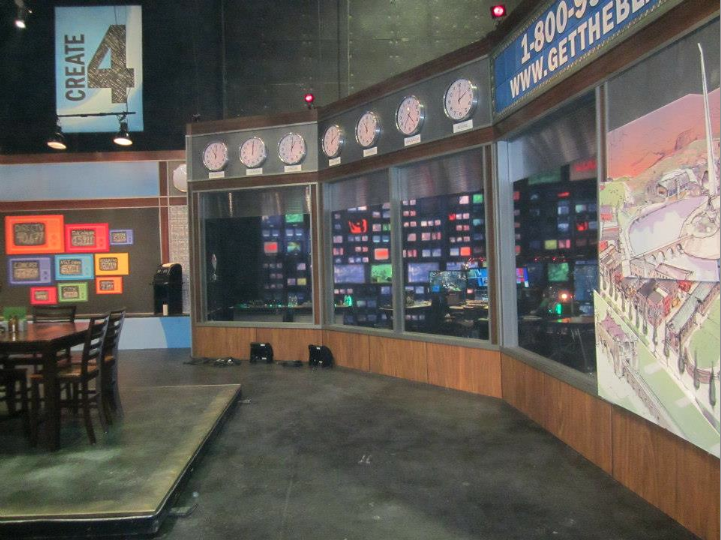
TheBlaze Dallas studios at the Studios at Las Colinas looking into the television control room

=== Notable program hosts for television, and radio and podcasts ===
TheBlaze Radio Network
- Type: Conservative libertarian internet talk radio
- Country: United States
- First air date: September 5, 2012
- Availability: Internet (iHeartRadio, TheBlaze apps, web)
- Area: Worldwide via Internet streaming and smartphone apps
- Owner: Blaze Media LLC
- Official website: www.theblaze.com/st/Radio

- Glenn Beck – host of Glenn TV and The Glenn Beck Radio Program
- Stu Burguiere – The Glenn Beck Radio Program (co-host/executive producer), Stu and Dave Do America (host)
- Steve Deace – host of the Steve Deace Show
- Kevin Freeman – host of Economic War Room
- Pat Gray – Pat Gray Unleashed (host), The Glenn Beck Radio Program (recurring regular and frequent fill-in host)
- Mark Levin – host of LevinTV
- Sara Gonzales - host of Sara Gonzales Unfiltered
- Jill Savage – host of Blaze News Tonight
- Liz Wheeler - host of The Liz Wheeler Show
- Allie Beth Stuckey – host of Relatable with Allie Beth Stuckey
- Matt Kibbe – host of Kibbe on Liberty
- Jason Whitlock – host of Fearless with Jason Whitlock
- Dave Landau - host of Stu and Dave Do America
- James Poulos - host of Zero Hour
- John Doyle - host of The John Doyle Show

=== Frequent guests ===
- Ben Shapiro – co-founder and editor emeritus of The Daily Wire and host of the syndicated radio show The Ben Shapiro Show
- Daniel Lapin – Jewish Rabbi
- David Barton – Christian Zionist, evangelical political activist and author
- Ted Cruz – United States senator from Texas
- Jeremy Boreing – COO and co-founder of The Daily Wire
- Mike Lee – United States senator from Utah
- Bill O'Reilly – Former television host of The O'Reilly Factor on Fox News, and host of No Spin News
- Dennis Prager – founder of PragerU and political commentator
- John W. Whitehead – founder of the Rutherford Institute
- Howard Kohr – CEO of AIPAC
- John Hagee – televangelist and founder of Christians United for Israel
- Kirk Cameron – evangelical actor
- Chrissie Mayr - comedian and host of the Chrissie Mayr Podcast and Chrissie Mayr's Wet Spot

=== Former hosts and contributors ===
- Lauren Chen – fired in 2024
- Steven Crowder – Louder with Crowder (departed 2022)
- S. E. Cupp – Real News
- Laurie Dhue – Blaze news anchor
- Tomi Lahren – Tomi (2015–2017)
- Dana Loesch – Dana (2013–2017)
- Michelle Malkin – host of Michelle Malkin Investigates (departed 2018, show moved to Newsmax TV)
- Gavin McInnes – host of Get Off My Lawn (departed 2018)
- Chad Prather – host of The Chad Prather Show until 2024
- Jay Severin – The Jay Severin Show (2012–2016)
- Andrew Heaton – Something's Off with Andrew Heaton (2018–2019)
- Andrew W.K. – America W.K.
- Andrew Wilkow – Wilkow! (departed 2021, show moved to Salem News Channel)

== Additional outlets ==
=== Radio ===
TheBlaze Radio Network was launched on September 5, 2012, and is available for free online via the company's website, iOS and Android apps, and the iHeartRadio app.

=== Website ===
TheBlaze.com

- show screenshot Homepage screenshot on May 14, 2016
- Website type: Online newspaper
- Available in: English
- Owner: Blaze Media LLC
- Editor: Leon Wolf
- Website: theblaze.com
- Commercial: Yes
- Launched: August 26, 2010; 16 years ago
- Current status: Active

TheBlaze website launched on August 26, 2010. According to Beck, the site took two months to design. At launch, the site's chief editor was Scott Baker, with its associate editor-video producer Pam Key and with Jon Seidl and Meredith Jessup as reporters. Key is known for her blog, Naked Emperor News: Smoking Gun Video and Images. Baker is a former Pittsburgh, Pennsylvania, broadcast journalist who previously worked at The Huffington Post and Breitbart TV. Seidl, of the Manhattan Institute, previously worked at The American Spectator. Jessup previously worked at Townhall. Journalists joining TheBlaze later included S. E. Cupp and David Harsanyi.

In January 2011, Betsy Morgan became president and Kraig Kitchin director of sales. Morgan had helmed The Huffington Post until 2009. Kitchin had formerly been the president of Premier Radio.

In March 2011, the site was noted for its critique of James O'Keefe's NPR sting video.

=== Magazine ===
TheBlaze (entitled Fusion prior to September 2012) was a monthly news magazine published by Mercury Radio Arts and TheBlaze in New York City and circulated throughout the United States. Its former title, Fusion, was taken from Beck's talk radio program's slogan, "The Fusion of Entertainment and Enlightenment." The editor-in-chief was Scott Baker. The magazine was sixteen pages and was published monthly, except for February and August. It was available digitally and in print. The last edition of TheBlaze magazine was published in April 2015.
