= Glenn Kimber =

American author and educator

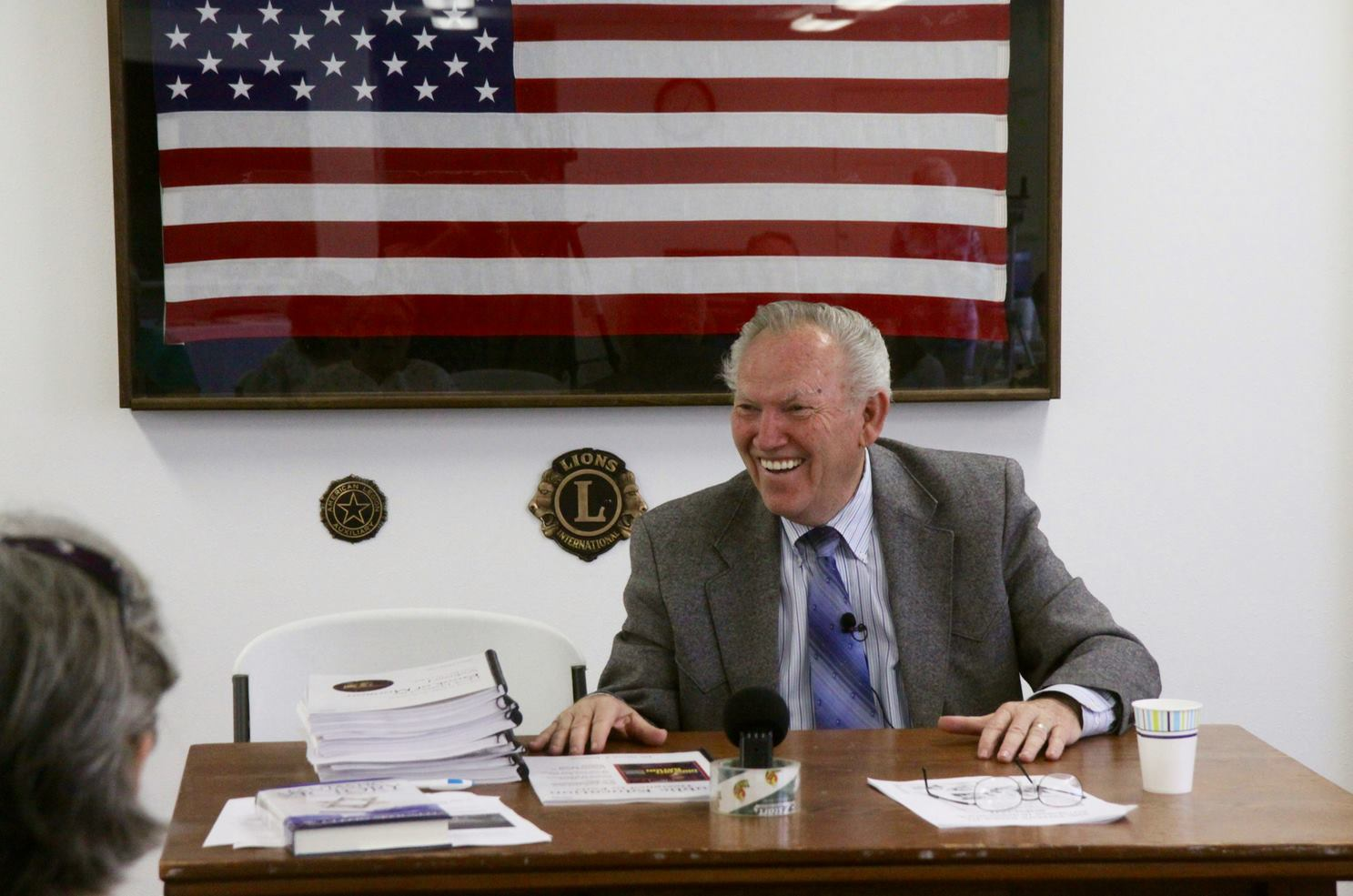

Glenn Kimber was an American author and educator. He founded Kimber Academy, a network of private schools, and is a prominent figure among U.S. homeschooling families.

Kimber has testified before a number of legislative committees in several states pertaining to Constitutional and educational issues. He has also been a guest on a number of radio and television talk shows.

Upon returning from Vietnam, Kimber continued his university studies, graduating with a bachelor's degree from Brigham Young University. He then joined with W. Cleon Skousen in establishing an educational foundation called the Freemen Institute, which was organized for the purpose of teaching American History and Constitutional studies. During the next number of years, Kimber presented patriotic seminars and conferences in all 50 states and in a number of foreign countries.

Kimber is a past president of the National Center for Constitutional Studies (NCCS), a conservative constitutionalist institution. He earned a B.S. in Accounting from Brigham Young University in 1971. Kimber was instrumental in developing a program for television called “The Miracle of America,” which was presented in a number of states.

Coral Ridge Baptist University awarded him an honorary Doctorate of Humanities in 1988. Kimber consulted on the initial curriculum design of George Wythe College, which awarded him a Ph.D. in education in 1994, two years after it opened. As a result of these degrees, he uses the designation of "Dr." in his curricula vitae.

Kimber joined William H. Doughty in building the Institute for Constitutional Education after it broke from the NCCS in 1986. He was also a board member at Doughty's Meadeau View Institute in the early 1990s.

He married a daughter of W. Cleon Skousen in 1965. He and his wife have authored over 100 textbooks and educational guides which emphasize the U.S. Constitution, America's Founding Fathers, and moral and religious values in all five core subjects. George Wythe College awarded her a B.S. in Biblical Studies in 1993, and under Skousen's mentorship, Coral Ridge Baptist University awarded her a masters in Religious Education the next year.

Kimber and Donald N. Sills (founder of George Wythe College) partnered to found a for-profit university called American Founders University.

He established a series of private schools called the Benjamin Franklin Academies to incorporate a strong moral and patriotic curriculum back into the classroom. In 2001 he also established the Kimber Academies, a private school for students ages K – 12.

Kimber conducts American History tours, as well as tours to the Middle East including Egypt, Jordan, and Israel.
