= Coral Ridge Baptist University =

College in Florida, U.S. (1985–2001)

Coordinates: 30.2915°N 81.5044°W

- Motto: I can do all things through Christ which strengtheneth me.
- Type: Private, unaccredited, religious
- Active: 1985–2001
- Affiliations: Baptist / Christian
- Faculty: 14
- Location: Jacksonville, Florida, United States
- Mascot: Patriots
- Website: WebArchive of www.crbu.net
- Coral Ridge Baptist University merged with Freedom University and Seminary in 2001

Coral Ridge Baptist University (CRBU) was a Bible college and seminary in Florida. It merged with Freedom University and Seminary in 2001.

== History ==
CRBU was founded by a group of Baptist ministers and non-denominational ministers, affiliated with the Liberty Baptist Fellowship, Southern Baptist Convention, Coral Ridge Christian Fellowship, the Baptist Bible Fellowship, and the World Baptist Fellowship. Based in Jacksonville, Florida, the Coral Ridge church provided all needed classrooms, offices and equipment. The school was seen as an extension of evangelistic ministry or as "the church involved in education and ministry training". Training in Women's Ministries began at the school's inception.

In 1992, Don Sills opened a branch of the school near Cedar City, Utah. This branch was named George Wythe College. Graduate student Oliver DeMille and two others began teaching on-campus classes at this location on September 21, 1992.

On January 1, 2002, George Wythe College became independent of CRBU.

== Degrees offered ==
In 2001 CRBU offered the following degrees, all "designed solely for ecclesiastical or ministerial and Christian education vocations".

- A.A. in Biblical Studies
- B.A. in Biblical Studies
- M.A. in Religion and in Divinity
- Ministry
- Ph.D. in Christian History, Biblical Missions, and Youth Ministries
- Th.D. in Theology

== Other ==
CRBU merged with Freedom University. CRBU is not connected with D. James Kennedy's Coral Ridge Ministries.

== Notable alumni ==
Name	Class year(s)	Degree(s)	Notability	Reference
William H. Doughty		Ph.D.	Founder of the Meadeau View Institute and the Institute for Constitutional Education	
Glenn Kimber	1988	Ph.D.	Founder of Kimber Academy chain of schools; Meadeau View Institute leader; son-in-law of W. Cleon Skousen	
Oliver DeMille	1992; 1992; 1994	B.A. M.A. Ph.D.	President of George Wythe College; author of A Thomas Jefferson Education	
Donald N. Sills	1986	Ph.D.	Founder of George Wythe College	
