= Institute for Constitutional Education =

American conservative constitutionalist organization

The Institute for Constitutional Education (ICE) was a conservative constitutionalist organization operating in Southern Utah from the mid-1980s to the early 1990s. It was formerly part of the National Center for Constitutional Studies and was later renamed "Families for America". The institute produced summer seminars at its facility in Duck Creek, Utah. The school George Wythe College was formed as a subsidiary of ICE in 1992, and control was later transferred to Coral Ridge Baptist University.

Notable directors include W. Cleon Skousen and William H. Doughty.

== Youth for America ==
Youth for America was an annual youth conference currently sponsored by George Wythe University. The conference was established by W. Cleon Skousen and William H. Doughty of the Institute for Constitutional Education in the 1980s to teach youth about American Government, leadership, education and community service.

When Doughty's Meadeau View Institute collapsed in 1994, the conferences were continued by George Wythe College, which the institute had established in 1992.

Through at least 2004, the conferences were held on Doughty's land in Mammoth Valley, Utah. In 2008, they were held in Cedar City, Utah, and Monticello, Utah.

In 2010, the conference was renamed Youth for Freedom to recognize international attendees.

== Publications ==
- The Divine Science of Good Government
- The History of the United States from a Constitutional Perspective
