= Meadeau View Institute =

The Meadeau View Institute was a conservative organization that operated in Duck Creek, Utah, from the mid-1980s to the early 1990s. The institute was notable for seeking to build a Utopian community of alternative-lifestyle conservatives in Southern Utah. The community collapsed in 1994 due to financial problems incident to the loss of property in an accidental explosion.

== Founding ==
William H. Doughty, the institute's founder and money manager, accepted over $1 million in donations and loans from backers in an attempt to build a conservative Utopia in Duck Creek and Mammoth Valley, Utah (near Hatch). In December 1986, Doughty purchased a vacant lodge in Duck Creek from Harry and Gabrielle Moyer, who carried the note for him. He later moved his Institute for Constitutional Education (ICE) from Cedar City to the lodge. Contributors include W. Cleon Skousen, Glenn Kimber, and Donald N. Sills.

== Collapse ==
During the winter of 1993, snow build-up from a record snowfall led to a propane explosion at the Meadeau View lodge. The investment which had been made in this asset was lost, as well as the income from seminars and conferences. As a result, donations and other fundraising efforts also failed, leading to the demise of the organization. On January 25, 1994, the Utah Division of Real Estate issued a cease-and-desist order to Doughty, ordering him to stop marketing the Mammoth land and timeshares at Liberty Village, because the offerings weren't registered with the division. At least 72 families and individuals were promised land at Mammoth with "donations" ranging from $2,000 to $14,000. The fledgeling George Wythe College, which had been holding classes in the lodge, moved to Cedar City, and those who sought to build the community, including Shanon Brooks (who later became president of George Wythe University), left.

As of 2004, Doughty still maintained a ranch in Mammoth Valley.

== Aftermath ==
The Deseret News reported that participants who lost money were reluctant to come forward to authorities, due to their inherent distrust for the government.

== External sources ==
=== Letters to the Deseret News ===
- Gleason, Coleen (July 29, 1994). "Perspectives On Doughty Story". Letter to the Editor. Deseret News. Archived from the original on July 30, 2009.
- Doughty, Steve (August 10, 1994). "Doughty Is A Pioneer Of Our Day". Letters to the Editor. Deseret News. Archived from the original on January 21, 2013.
- Riddle, Mark A. (August 22, 1994). "Development Doomed Ideal". Letters to the Editor. Deseret News. Archived from the original on January 21, 2013.
