= Restoring Honor rally =

2010 rally in Washington, D.C.

- Logo used for the 8/28/2010 Restoring Honor rally at the Steps of the Lincoln Memorial
- Date: August 28, 2010
- Location: The National Mall Washington, D.C.
- Participants: Sponsors Glenn Beck Special Operations Warrior Foundation Promoters FreedomWorks Americans for Prosperity Tea Party movement Fox News Channel 9·12 Project Main speakers Glenn Beck Sarah Palin Alveda King
- Website: GlennBeck.com/828

The Restoring Honor rally was held August 28, 2010, at the Lincoln Memorial in Washington, D.C., and was organized by Glenn Beck to "restore honor in America" and to raise funds for the non-profit Special Operations Warrior Foundation. Billed as a "celebration of America's heroes and heritage," several veterans were honored. Along with Beck, the speakers included former Republican vice presidential nominee Sarah Palin and activist Alveda King, a niece of Martin Luther King Jr.

Beck's speech urged Americans of all religions to turn to their faith in God, "turning our face back to the values and principles that made us great". Beck's and Palin's speeches praised George Washington, Abraham Lincoln, and Martin Luther King Jr., as well as American war veterans. Beck called for Americans to unite despite political or religious disagreements, with 240 clergy from different races and religions – belonging to the ecumenical ministerial group, the Black Robe Regiment – joining the events' speakers on stage before its closing statements.

The attendance at the rally was disputed: a scientific estimate placed the crowd size around 87,000, while media reports varied wildly from tens of thousands to 500,000. The event was held at the Lincoln Memorial, the same location, and the 47th anniversary of the 1963 March on Washington and Martin Luther King Jr.'s historic "I Have a Dream" speech, drawing criticism from African American leaders who believed the rally was clouding the legacy of the Civil Rights Movement. Beck's Mormonism was a concern for some of his evangelical fans.

== Announcement ==
On November 21, 2009, at The Villages, Florida, Beck announced a rally to be held on August 28, 2010, in Washington, D.C., at the Lincoln Memorial. Beck originally intended the rally as political, and planned to promote his next book, The Plan, in which he would outline a century-long plan to "save the country". Over the 2009 Christmas holidays, however, Beck claimed the event would be "non-political", and focus on raising awareness and funds for the Special Operations Warrior Foundation charity, because soliciting tax-exempt funds to pay for the rally through the charity restricts political activity. The charity receives funds collected above the amount needed to pay for the rally. Beck named his planned rally "Restoring Honor," saying its theme was "about honoring character" as well as honoring the sacrifices of U.S. Armed Services personnel.

Commentators noted that the planned date would be the forty-seventh anniversary of the Great March on Washington, at which, on August 28, 1963, King had accompanied an assemblage of 250,000 civil rights movement marchers from the Washington Monument to the Lincoln Memorial, where King delivered his "I Have a Dream" speech. Beck said the timing and place for his event was coincidental but appropriate, with its theme agreeing with King's "message of focusing on the content of a person's character above all else." The rally would coincide with the Reclaim the Dream commemorative march planned by Al Sharpton and Martin Luther King III for further down on the National Mall and adjacent to the Tidal Basin, at the future site of the Martin Luther King Jr. Memorial, which created concern over the two groups possibly clashing.

== Preparations ==
Organizers hoped as many as 300,000 would attend, with the National Park Service preparing for 100,000 and the D.C. Homeland Security and Emergency Management Agency preparing for 100,000–200,000. Former governor of Alaska and 2008 Republican vice presidential candidate Sarah Palin and Alveda King, niece of Dr. Martin Luther King Jr., were announced as speakers. Expected attendees included Major League Baseball player Albert Pujols and MLB manager Tony La Russa, both of whom decided to attend after being assured by Beck that the rally would not be political. Beck broadcast his TV show from the Fox News Washington studio instead of New York in the week leading up to the event.

== Pre-event criticism ==
=== March On Washington anniversary ===
Various civil rights leaders of the black community criticized Beck leading up to the event, under the auspice that picking the anniversary of Dr. King's 1963 speech was a "deliberate way to distort King's message." Rev. Carlton W. Veazey, minister of the National Baptist Convention and president of Religious Coalition for Reproductive Choice, held a press conference to announce his opposition to Beck's rally. After referring to Beck's comment from July 2009 that President Barack Obama has "over and over again" exposed himself as "a guy who has a deep-seated hatred for white people or the white culture", Veazey stated:

What they are trying to do is divert the nation from the agenda of Martin Luther King to their agenda, and I think that's hijacking his legacy. What they have said all the time, have been trying to divide people, trying to exclude people. For him to lead a rally with that kind of attitude taints the whole affair.

Al Sharpton, president of the National Action Network called Beck's event an "outright attempt to flip the imagery of Dr. King", while accusing Beck of circumventing and distorting King's legacy. Former civil rights leader Eleanor Holmes Norton, the District of Columbia's non-voting representative in Congress, opined that if Beck "has any respect for the unity across racial lines that August 28 represented, he would not hold what looks to be an all-white march that cannot possibly appeal across racial lines because of how he has modeled himself on radio and television." In similar remarks, Washington, D.C., City Councilman Harry Thomas Jr. accused Beck of "hypocrisy at its highest degree".

Martin Luther King III, Dr. King's son and cousin of speaker Dr. Alveda King, noted that as a "champion of free speech", his father "would be the first to say that those participating in Beck's rally have the right to express their views." However, King reminded Beck that his father's dream "rejected hateful rhetoric and all forms of bigotry or discrimination, whether directed at race, faith, nationality, sexual orientation or political beliefs". King also pointed out that his father "advocated compassion for the poor" and "wholeheartedly embraced the social gospel", noting that King's spiritual and intellectual mentors included social gospel advocates Walter Rauschenbusch and Howard Thurman.

Similarly, Rev. Jim Wallis, of the Sojourners Community, admonished Beck under the rationale that "Martin Luther King Jr. was clearly a Social Justice Christian", noting that this is "the term and people that Beck constantly derides." After pointing out that Dr. King gave a December 18, 1963 speech entitled "Social Justice and the Emerging New Age", Wallis related Dr. King's 1961 warning to the AFL–CIO that "before the victory is won, some will be misunderstood, some will be called reds and communists merely because they believe in economic justice and the brotherhood of man." According to Wallis, if Beck were "an honest man", he would thus have to brand Dr. King a "communist, socialist, (or) Marxist" in the same way that he has branded those currently who are calling for "economic and social justice".

=== Media reaction ===
Leading up to the event, Beck attracted criticism from various media personalities, comedians and writers. MSNBC's Keith Olbermann stated that he was worried about Glenn Beck's sanity after Beck said that he wanted to let "the spirit" speak through him at the rally. The day before the rally on the same network, Chris Matthews, of Hardball With Chris Matthews, used his ending segment to announce:

Can we imagine if King were physically here tomorrow, today, were he to reappear tomorrow on the very steps of the Lincoln Memorial? I have a nightmare that one day a right wing talk show host will come to this spot, his people's lips dripping with the words interposition and nullification. Little right wing boys and little right wing girls joining hands and singing their praise for Glenn Beck and Sarah Palin. I have a nightmare.

Political satirists such as Comedy Central's Jon Stewart dubbed the rally "Beckapalooza" and "I Have A Scheme", while Stephen Colbert facetiously announced that he was ready to follow Beck in his "silver freedom spaceship that runs on human tears". Journalist Jason Linkins was critical of what he deemed an "insanely melodramatic video promotion of the rally, replete with Goldline scamflackery", positing that the "Glenn Beck rally will be like (the) Moon landing, Wright Brothers and Rosa Parks all rolled into one massive orgasm of American history." Film director and activist Robert Greenwald created a website and video entitled "Glenn Beck is Not Martin Luther King Jr.", which provided a petition featuring over 30,000 signatures the day before the rally, denouncing Beck.

A.J. Calhoun, who attended the original 1963 King rally, criticized Beck's holding what he called a "rally of right-wingers, Tea Partiers, neoconservatives, fascists, the delusional and the truly wicked, (and) the New Kluxers disguised as patriots wanting something they cannot or will not identify openly." Eugene Robinson of The Washington Post described Beck as an "egomaniacal talk-show host who profit(s) handsomely from stoking fear, resentment and anger", while calling his "absurdly titled" rally "an exercise in self-aggrandizement on a Napoleonic scale." Robinson, continued his Napoleon analogy by ending his column with a quip that he half-expected Beck to "appear before the crowd in a bicorne hat, with one hand tucked into the front of his jacket."

Alexander Zaitchik, author of the 2010 unauthorized Beck biography Common Nonsense: Glenn Beck and the Triumph of Ignorance, also rejected Beck's embrace of the civil rights mantle, remarking:

This is the guy who has a whole history, going back in Top 40 radio, of using racist jokes, racist humor, making fun of police brutality, and with a very deep hatred for black social justice activists. Beck stood by his claim that Obama is a racist and has frequently referred to the president's initiatives – including health care – as reparations.

According to Zaitchik, the purpose of the rally was not primarily to honor heroes, but was the fulfillment of Beck's long-held dream of holding an event on the National Mall. In elaborating on his "cynical" hypothesis, Zaitchik stated "I view this through a prism of his business – he's in a very competitive media world with many distractions and this will enable him to be the topic of conversation."

== Divine Destiny meeting ==
On August 27, 2010, the evening before the rally, at an event not officially connected with the rally, Glenn Beck and David Barton co-hosted the "Divine Destiny" inspirational patriotic meeting at the 2,454-seat Concert Hall in the John F. Kennedy Center for the Performing Arts. Beck and his wife rented the Hall and the audience consisted mostly of about 2000 religious leaders to whom Beck and Barton had given tickets. The remaining tickets were offered to the general public for free. Many lined up all night inside the Kennedy Center to get the tickets which were released the morning of the 27th, and Beck made a surprise visit to the people in line. The event was emceed by Scott Baker, with Randy Forbes, founder of the Congressional Prayer Caucus, and Christian-Zionist pastor John Hagee offering prayers. Former Texas Supreme Court Justice Raul Gonzales led the Pledge of Allegiance. An "all-star" gospel music choir performed various religious and patriotic selections (while several of its members performed praise dance), including a rendition of "The Battle Hymn of the Republic." Twila Paris sang "True North" and J. E. McKissic, co-pastor of Cornerstone Baptist Church of Fort Worth, Texas, sang "God Bless America."

Beck was introduced by Pat Gray, his radio show co-host and close friend who baptized him in 1999 into Mormonism, and spoke briefly, remarking:

This building was [filled] by invitation [to] some of the best and bravest pastors, priests, rabbis, clerics in the country. Tomorrow, we will announce the beginning of the Black-Robed Regiment. And here is what's amazing, here's what's amazing, they keep saying this is a political event, and it is not. It is not a political event at all. I'm convinced that not just this event, but this time period is going to be remembered as the beginning of the great awakening in America.

Other speakers included Barton, televangelist Gloria Copeland, Rabbi Daniel Lapin, Dr. Patrick Lee of the Franciscan University of Steubenville, the Rev. Miles McPherson (formerly a San Diego Chargers football player), actor Chuck Norris, and the Rev. Dave Roever (a decorated Vietnam War veteran).

== Rally events ==
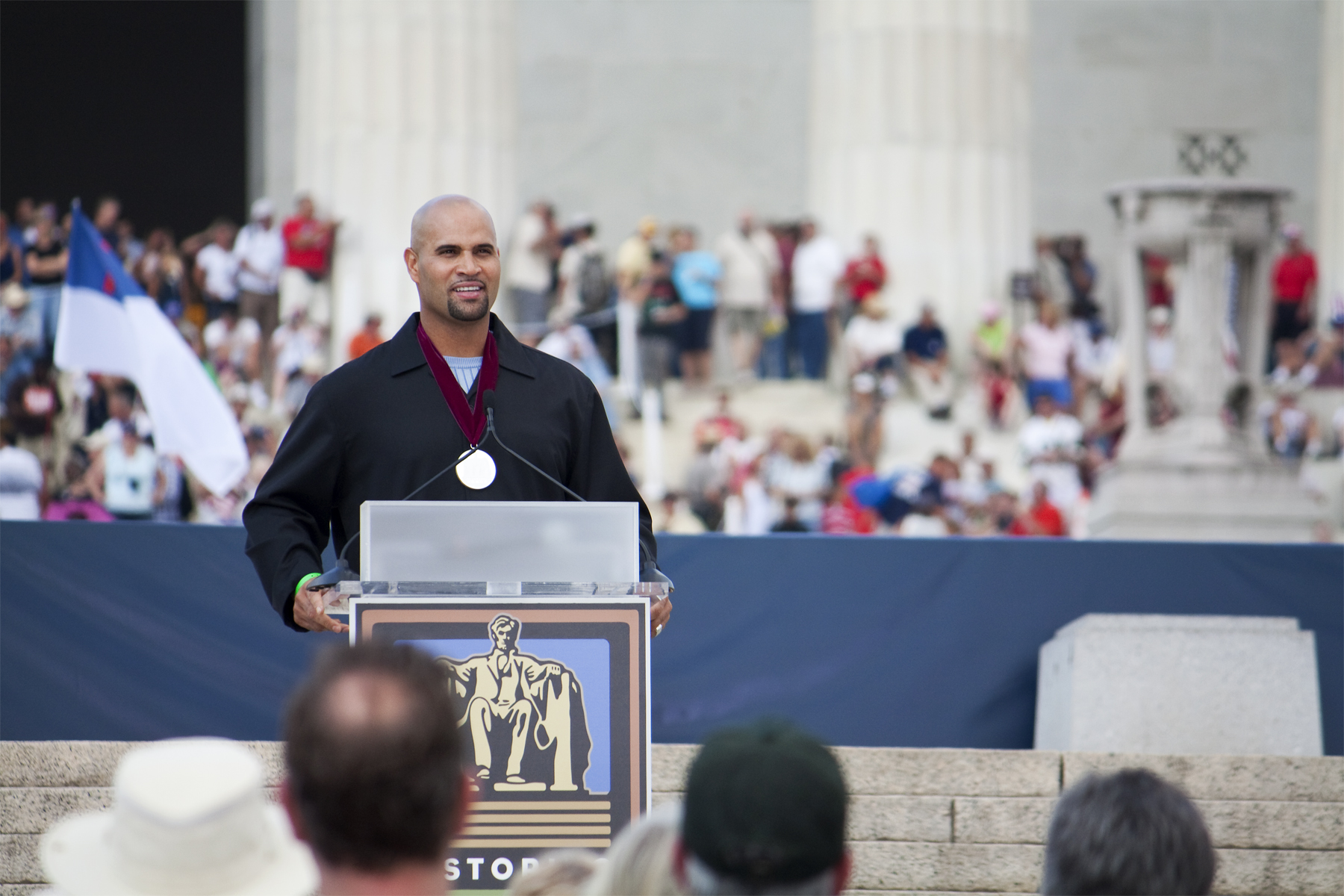
Albert Pujols during a speech at the rally

Beck asked that attendees refrain from bringing signs to the event. Speakers at the 8/28 rally included Sarah Palin, Alveda King, and Beck. Many in the crowd watched the proceedings on large television screens. On the edges of the Mall, vendors sold "Don't Tread on Me" flags, popular with Tea Party activists. Other activists distributed fliers urging voters to "dump Obama." However, the speeches themselves were restricted from overt partisanship as the tax-exempt co-sponsor of the event, the Special Operations Warrior Foundation, required all speakers to sign an agreement promising not to talk politics. Of note, all proceeds raised through Beck's promotion of the event were slated to go to SOWF, after the estimated $1 million costs for the rally itself were covered. Beck gave out "badge of merit" awards to three people for service in the categories of faith, hope, and charity.

Catherine McDonald, head of the Atlanta chapter of the 9.12 Project, opined that Beck was providing a forum for people who believe the nation has lost its sense of honor and focus, remarking "These are people who believe this country was founded on good principles and God."

Richard Land president of The Ethics & Religious Liberty Commission later attempted to spin the event as ecumenical, remarking that:

We had rabbis praying. We had Catholic priests praying. We had Muslim imams praying and participating. We had Protestant Christians. And he kept saying over and over again this is not a political event, and politics is not the answer. The answer is spiritual renewal and rebuilding a civil society one person, one family, one church, mosque, synagogue, temple, and one community at a time.

=== Alveda King ===
Alveda King, a minister and anti-abortion activist and former Georgia State Representative who is a niece of the civil rights leader Martin Luther King Jr., appealed to rally attendees to "focus not on elections or on political causes but on honor, on character ... not the color of our skin. Yes, I too have a dream. ... That America will pray and God will forgive us our sins and revive us our land." King also addressed the civil rights leaders and members of the black community who had been critical of the rally, responding that "My daddy, Rev. A. D. King, my granddaddy, Martin Luther King, Senior – we are a family of faith, hope and love. And that's why I'm here today. Glenn says there is one human race; I agree with him. We are not here to divide. I'm about unity. That's why I'm here, and I want to honor my uncle today."

=== Sarah Palin ===
Palin told the crowd that calls to transform the country were not enough; "We must restore America and restore her honor." Palin likened the rally participants to the civil rights activists from 1963, and said the same spirit that helped them overcome oppression, discrimination and violence would help this group as well. Palin's lines such as, "Look around you. You're not alone. You are Americans! You have the same steel spine and moral courage of Washington and Lincoln and Martin Luther King. It is in you. It will sustain you as it sustained them," were greeted by the crowd's standing ovations and chants of "U!–S!–A!"

=== Glenn Beck ===
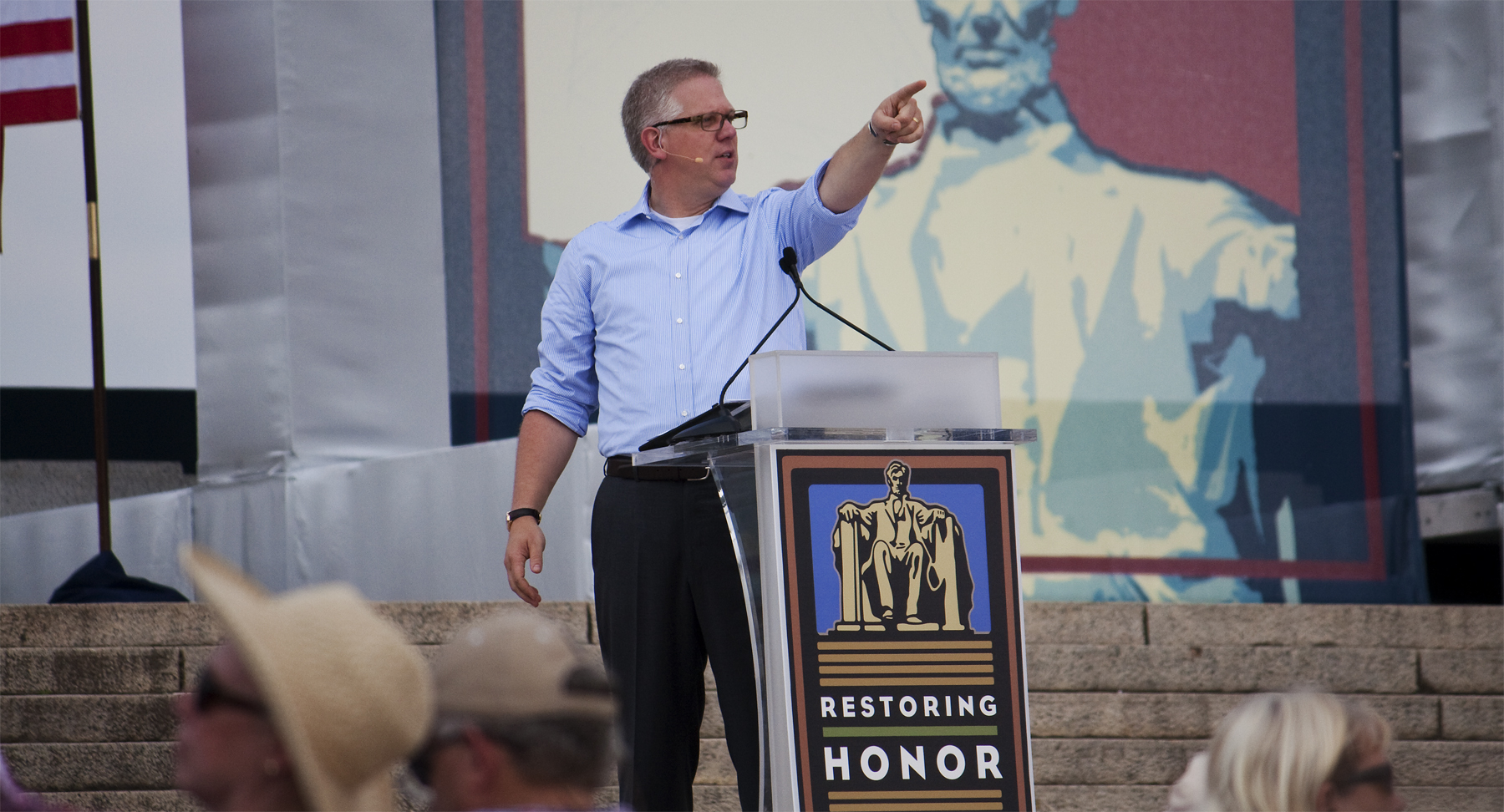
Glenn Beck speaking to the crowd during the rally

Beck opened his remarks by decreeing that "Something beyond imagination is happening. America today begins to turn back to God." He later said,

Let's be honest. If you look at history, America has been both terribly good and terribly bad. It has been both, but to concentrate on the bad instead of learning from the bad and repairing the bad and then looking to the good that is still out in front of us within our reach— We have a choice today. We can either let those scars crush us or redeem us. We must extend to those we disagree with— But, you are honest and have integrity! There were people on stage that not only took a great personal risk but also, one in particular, organized for our president – lead a prayer breakfast – is a Democrat. You think the media would tell you that "This was only a bunch of tea partiers." No, that person stood on the ... stage because of honor. And there is a lot we can disagree on but our values and our principles can unite us. We must discover them again. Recognize your place to the creator. Realize that he is our king. He is the one who guides and directs our life and protects us. I ask, not only if you would pray on your knees, but pray on your knees but with your door open for your children to see.

Beck, in referring to Dr. King, noted that he had spent the night before in the same Washington hotel where King had put the finishing touches on his famous "I Have a Dream" speech.

Beck wore a bulletproof vest at the request of his wife.

=== Program ===
Additional features of the event included: the songs "Heaven Was Needing A Hero" and "America, the Beautiful," sung by Jo Dee Messina; the Pledge of Allegiance, led by a Boy Scout; the National Anthem, sung a cappella; the gathered masses' singing of "Amazing Grace," as accompanied by bagpipers; and pastors' offerings of invocation (D. Paul Jehle, The New Testament Church, Plymouth, Massachusetts) and benediction (the Reverend Dave Roever). At the event, Beck introduced a group of 240 religious leaders from among the "Black Robe Regiment," that includes clergy of various denominations, ranging from evangelical pastors to Roman Catholic priests to Jewish rabbis to Muslim imams, among others. Also there were presentations of Badges of Merit awards to individuals selected by Beck.

=== List of gathering's honorees ===
Badges of Merit
To armed services veterans			Presented by
Badge of Merit purple heart	Marcus Luttrell	Navy SEAL, Afghanistan. Sole survivor, Taliban ambush. Founder, Lone Survivor Foundation	Sarah Palin
Badge of Merit purple heart	James "Eddie" Wright	Marine Sergeant, Iraq. Lost hands but lead men to safety. Co-founder, Operation Grateful Nation	Sarah Palin
Badge of Merit purple heart	Thomas Henry "Tom" Kirk, Jr.	Air Force squadron commander, Vietnam. 5 1/2-years captivity in Hanoi; for 2 of them, John McCain's cellmate	Sarah Palin
Civilian			Presented by
For faith	Charles Lewis "C. L." Jackson	Pastor at Pleasant Grove Missionary Baptist Church in Houston, Texas; founded 17 churches; stood with Martin Luther King on August 28, 1963	Negiel Bigpond evangelist, Yuchi Nation
For hope	Albert Pujols	Evangelizing immigrant-athlete and founder, Pujols Family Foundation, helping children with Down Syndrome and other charitable endeavors	Tony La Russa
For charity	Jon Huntsman, Sr.	Philanthropist-author, Winners Never Cheat. Proxy acceptor: Emma Houston (treated at Huntsman Cancer Institute)	Raul A. Gonzalez

=== Black Robe Regiment ===
During the rally weekend, Beck promoted a Black Robe Regiment (BRR) on his radio program, envisioned as a grass-root efforts to rally clergy to conservative American Constitutionalist activism (as with one-time Constitution Party U.S. presidential candidate Chuck Baldwin's group of this name) combined with generalized, moral revival.

The name was taken from phrases such as black regiment or black robe brigade occasionally used by British Loyalists during the American Revolution – not to refer to a fighting force but to Protestant clergymen, predominantly non-Anglican, that assisted in rallying the populace to take up arms against the crown.

Becoming interested in the concept of the BRR through David Barton, Beck decided to promote the group himself, taking it in a more ecumenical direction. Beck arranged to meet with about eighteen high-profile evangelical Christians, including James Robison, James Dobson, John Hagee, and Richard Land, at The London, a New York City hotel, on June 30, 2010, to discuss the religious dimension Beck was seeking in his talk shows.

Some of the leaders, such as Land, participated in Beck's rally. Land said after the event that he was a charter member of the BRR. According to press reports, other members were Dobson, Jerry Falwell Jr., Richard Lee (pastor of First Redeemer Church of Atlanta, Georgia), Harry Jackson (Hope Christian Church in Maryland), Shawn Mitchell (New Venture Christian Fellowship, Oceanside, California and Chaplain, San Diego Chargers, NFL's longest-tenured chaplain), Jim Garlow (Skyline Wesleyan Church, San Diego, California) and Catholic social conservative activist Maggie Gallagher.

According to Beck, a group at the rally selected from among the "thousands"-strong "Black Robe Regiment was introduced on stage which is, was 240 pastors, priests, rabbis and imams on stage all locked arms saying the principles of America need to be taught from the pulpit."

=== Crowd size ===
Crowd size estimates
View of the central corridor crowd taken from the east side of the Lincoln Memorial Reflecting Pool. Additional people were seated on the sides beyond the trees.
Source	Crowd estimate
ABC News	Over 100,000
Associated Press	Tens of thousands
CBS News and AirPhotosLive.com	87,000 ± 9,000
McClatchy Newspapers	Hundreds of thousands
NBC Nightly News	Tens to hundreds of thousands
New York Post	300,000
The Daily Telegraph	Hundreds of thousands
Unnamed official per NBC reporter tweet	300,000-325,000
Washington Examiner	Well into six figures

The New York Daily News said crowd counts depended "dramatically on who you ask". Before the rally Beck expected a crowd of 100,000, and he joked during his rally that "I have just gotten word from the media that there is over a thousand people here today." CBS News' commissioned AirPhotosLive for the rally's only scientific estimate, which placed attendance at 87,000 plus or minus 9,000.

NBC News and the New York Post put attendance at 300,000. NBC reporter Domenico Montanaro tweeted that an "official at top of memorial said 300-325K." Less exact was the New York Times, which simply called the crowd "enormous", and Fox News Channel, which referred to "strong" turnout with "huge crowds". Though NPR doubted that an accurate estimate was possible, they nonetheless said attendance was in the "tens of thousands", the same estimate of the Associated Press, while ABC News reported "more than 100,000 people" at the rally.

Some media outlets used ranges to report crowd size. The Washington Examiner, relying on "photographic comparisons to past events" reported attendance as being "well into six figures". The Daily Telegraph and McClatchy Newspapers agreed that the crowd was somewhere in the hundreds of thousands.

No estimates were issued by National Park Service, which had ceased making public estimates after rally sponsors from the Million Man March in 1995 threatened court action over official estimates.

== Post-rally response ==
This was a tent revival crossed with a pep rally intertwined with a history lecture married to a U.S.O. telethon – and that was just in the first hour. There was piety – endless piety, as speaker after speaker demanded that Americans rededicate themselves to God. There was patriotism: fund- raising for children of slain Special Forces vets, paeans to military heroism (delivered by Sarah Palin, among others), encomiums to the founding fathers ... There was enough material, in other words, to justify almost any interpretation of the event. A Beck admirer could spin 'Restoring Honor' as proof that left-wing fears about the Tea Partiers are overblown: free of rancor, racism or populist resentment, the atmosphere at the rally resembled that of a church picnic or a high school football game. But a suspicious liberal could retort that all the God-and-Christ talk and military tributes were proof enough that a sinister Christian nationalism lurked beneath the surface.

— Ross Douthat, conservative op-ed writer for The New York Times

=== Beck's comments ===
==== On the rally ====
I believe we're approaching a last call, all aboard. I had nightmares last night, because I felt maybe I wasn't clear enough. The message I feel I'm supposed to give you is get behind the shield of God.

— Glenn Beck, recap show on the event, August 30, 2010

Beck used the full hour of his TV show on August 30 to talk about the rally. He said the crowd "was polite. It was calm. It was friendly. It was welcoming. It was helpful," and noted that zero arrests were made "in a crowd this size". In summing up the event, Beck declared that "What you saw was a minimum of 500,000 people who never claimed that God was on their side. They wanted to change their lives so they could be on God's side." Moreover, he said in preparing for the rally he tried for a year to get a military flyover or someone in a military uniform to present the flag and could not; at 9:59 am, one minute before the rally's scheduled start time, a flock of geese flew directly over the rally. Beck called it a miracle. He also said he received a call from the Smithsonian saying they wanted "items from the event preserved for the Smithsonian." During his recap broadcast, Beck also displayed a photograph of Sarah Palin at the rally, capturing her praying "for a full 10 minutes", remarking that it was "the most beautiful picture of Sarah Palin ever taken."

On The O'Reilly Factor on August 30, he described "the hate from the other side" as the "lowlight" of the rally and said, "I warn you, America, the attacks are going to get worse." He said he offered a bulletproof vest to Alveda King but she decided not to take it. He also described her as "a marked woman for standing on that step with me".

==== On media coverage ====
Beck commented on media coverage of the rally, such as the New York Times calling him "the anti-King" and a quote (misattributed to NPR) by The Root worrying that the event could spiral into a "pit of hatred". Two days before the rally, The Root had written, "Little is known about the event except that there will be speeches by Beck and Sarah Palin, and attendees are prohibited from bringing signs. The fear, of course, is that it will turn into a pit of hatred a la the health-care town halls. But there may be a glimmer of hope."

=== From the media ===
Hours after the rally finished, Martin Luther King Jr.'s personal attorney and speechwriter, Clarence B. Jones, said he believes King would not have been offended by Beck's rally but "pleased and honored". Jones, a visiting professor at Stanford University, said the Beck rally seemed to be tasteful and did not appear to distort King's message, which included a recommitment to religious values. James Freeman, in an op-ed for The Wall Street Journal, wrote positively about the rally, remarking that "the day was largely devoted to expressions of gratitude for the sacrifices of U.S. soldiers, for great men of American history like the Rev. Martin Luther King Jr., and for God." He said "you couldn't find a more polite crowd" and remarked that he couldn't find a single piece of trash left on the Mall by attendees. After noting how the crowd refused to boo when Dave Roever gave the closing prayer thanking God for President Barack Obama and members of Congress, Freeman theorized that "between Saturday's crowd in Washington and the tea partiers agitating for limited government, we may be witnessing the rebuilding of the Reagan coalition, the fusion of religious and economic conservatives." Fox News host Bill O'Reilly described it as an "appeal for a return to Judeo-Christian values" and called it "a huge victory for Glenn Beck and Americans who believe that his message of honor and dignity is worthwhile." He also said, "I don't think there's anybody in the country that could have mobilized that many people at this point in time."

Conversely, liberal radio host Bill Press, who attended the rally personally, criticized the "Christian religious fervor" of the event, remarking that at one point he expected Beck "to part the Reflecting Pool and walk across it." In discussing the setting among the crowd, Press stated that it was "a strange combination of political rally and religious revival", which left him surrounded by the "old, white, and angry". Former Democratic National Committee chairman Howard Dean questioned Beck's mental sanity, while referring to Beck's audience as "lost souls" in the middle of an economic downturn who then follow the "racist" and "hatemonger" Beck, whom Dean compared to Father Coughlin from the 1930s. Author Christopher Hitchens in Slate, critiqued the rally as a "large, vague, moist, and undirected Waterworld of white self-pity", describing the spectacle as a consequence of the white American subconscious feeling anxiety mixed with nostalgia at the uneasy realization that soon they will no longer be the majority. In Hitchens' view, the expressions of "pathos and insecurity", were voiced in a "sickly", "pious" and "persecuted" tone, while the speeches "denied racial feeling so monotonously and vehemently as to draw attention". The Huffington Post compiled a slideshow of what they believed were "the most ridiculous messages" from Beck's rally, while Eric Deggans, media critic for the St. Petersburg Times, hypothesized that with the rally, Beck had created a blueprint for "ultra-conservative" Tea Party activists to look more mainstream to independent voters before the November 2010 midterm elections.

=== Theological tensions ===
Look, I'm Mormon, and most Christians don't recognize me as a Christian.

— Glenn Beck, the day after the rally (August 29, 2010) in an interview with Chris Wallace on Fox News Sunday.

Mark Caleb Smith, director of the Center for Political Studies at Cedarville University, said, "Many of the people you'd say are members of the Christian right would consider Mormonism to be cultish, and so what's interesting is that Beck [by means of the rally] is seemingly building bridges to that community from a very different theological perspective." However, several theologically conservative evangelicals, many of them Beck fans politically, criticized evangelicals' "standing together in the faith" with Beck at the religion-centered rally, because Beck is Mormon and thus in their view not "a fellow Christian."

After announcement of the planned rally, Brannon Howse, a professional organizer of Christian conferences, expressed wariness, stating "The Apostle Paul warns Christians against uniting with unbelievers in spiritual endeavors. While I applaud and agree with many of Glenn Beck's conservative and constitutional views, that does not give me or any other Bible-believing Christian justification to compromise Biblical truth by spiritually joining Beck." Breakpoint's Diane Singer said, "If you're like me and believe [Mormons] have been deceived into following another Jesus, then perhaps you share my concerns. I want real revival to come to America, which means it must be based on Truth, not deception." In response to the rally, Warren Cole Smith, associate publisher of the Christian-themed World magazine, said:

I will say that there is a significant minority of evangelicals who have deep concerns about Beck's true motives. The fact that he is a Mormon. While the Mormon religion shares some common ground with biblically orthodox Christian faith, there's a significant amount of primarily theological ground that's not common between these two faiths. ... There are serious theological differences between Beck's conception of God and an evangelical conception of God. [Beck's] language resonates with evangelicals but is the meaning the same? I fear that evangelicals will be duped.

However, Jerry Falwell, Jr., attended the event and defended Beck, remarking "Glenn Beck's Mormon faith is irrelevant. People of all faiths, all races and all creeds spoke and attended the event. Nobody was there to endorse anyone else's faith, but we were all there to honor our armed forces and to call the people of America to restore honor." The American Family Association's Bryan Fischer said that while Beck's faith "is a problem", evangelicals are able to use Beck for their purposes during the Restoring Honor rally. Fischer remarked:

While Glenn Beck provided the platform, evangelicals provided the message. Beck depended heavily on historian and committed evangelical David Barton for assistance in picking speakers and selecting those who would lead in prayer and worship. A Mormon teed up the ball for evangelical Protestants. And evangelicals hit it out of the park.

=== Subsequent related rallies ===
A liberal One Nation Working Together rally took place on the Mall on October 2, 2010, sponsored by 300 various liberal groups, including the NAACP, the AFL–CIO, and Organizing for America. Organizers hoped 100,000 would attend, and claimed more people were at their rally than at Beck's, but the New York Times said "significant areas of the National Mall that had been filled during Mr. Beck's rally were empty." Various other media outlets, including the Associated Press, Politico, the Washington Post, and ABC News, all agreed there were significantly fewer people than at Restoring Honor.

Beck criticized the event for allegedly being political in nature as opposed to his, saying, "they are organizing for their version of America. They are pulling out all the stops. This is truly, truly Astroturf ... we also didn't have a political message. The message was about God." He also claimed that the rally was sponsored by groups such as the Communist Party USA, International Socialist Organization, SEIU, and Code Pink, among others.

On October 30, 2010, Comedy Central comedians Stephen Colbert and Jon Stewart hosted a rally at the National Mall called the Rally to Restore Sanity and/or Fear, which drew approximately 215,000 people according to aerial photography analysis by AirPhotosLive.com.

== See also ==
- Taxpayer March on Washington
- The Blaze (online news, information and opinion site), launched by Beck three days after the rally
