= The Five Thousand Year Leap =

1981 book by Cleon Skousen

- Author: W. Cleon Skousen
- Language: English
- Genre: Christianity; Mormonism; Political science American history
- Publisher: National Center for Constitutional Studies
- Publication date: June 1981
- Publication place: United States
- ISBN: 978-0-88080-004-4

The Five Thousand Year Leap: Twenty-Eight Great Ideas That Are Changing the World is a book that was published in 1981 by American Mormon author and attorney W. Cleon Skousen. The book asserts that the United States prospered because it was established upon universal natural law principles that had been passed down from common law and traditional Judeo-Christian morality, as many of the Founding Fathers had been guided by the Bible, among others. Thus, the book asserts that the U.S. Constitution incorporates enlightened ideas.

== Criticism ==
Associate Professor at the University of Texas at Austin of Ancient Mediterranean Religions Tony Keddie describes The 5,000 Year Leap as a book that suggests that Jesus "promoted the prosperity of the commonwealth... and the freedom (and responsibility) of individuals to improve themselves."

Princeton University historian Sean Wilentz disputes the book's claims on taxes, the redistribution of wealth, the separation of church and state, and the "In God We Trust" motto. Wilentz describes The 5,000 Year Leap as "a treatise that assembles selective quotations and groundless assertions to claim that the US Constitution is rooted not in the Enlightenment but in the Bible and that the framers believed in minimal central government." Wilentz categorically disputes those assertions:

Either proposition would have astounded James Madison, often described as the guiding spirit behind the Constitution, who rejected state-established religions and, like Alexander Hamilton, proposed a central government so strong that it could veto state laws.

Wilentz acknowledges that the Founding Fathers rejected what Samuel Adams denounced as "utopian schemes of leveling," but he notes that some of the Founding Fathers were quite pragmatic when it came to policy specifics.

== See also ==
- The Naked Communist
