= Mammoth Creek (Utah) =

Creek in Utah, United States

Coordinates: 37°37′34″N 112°26′44″W

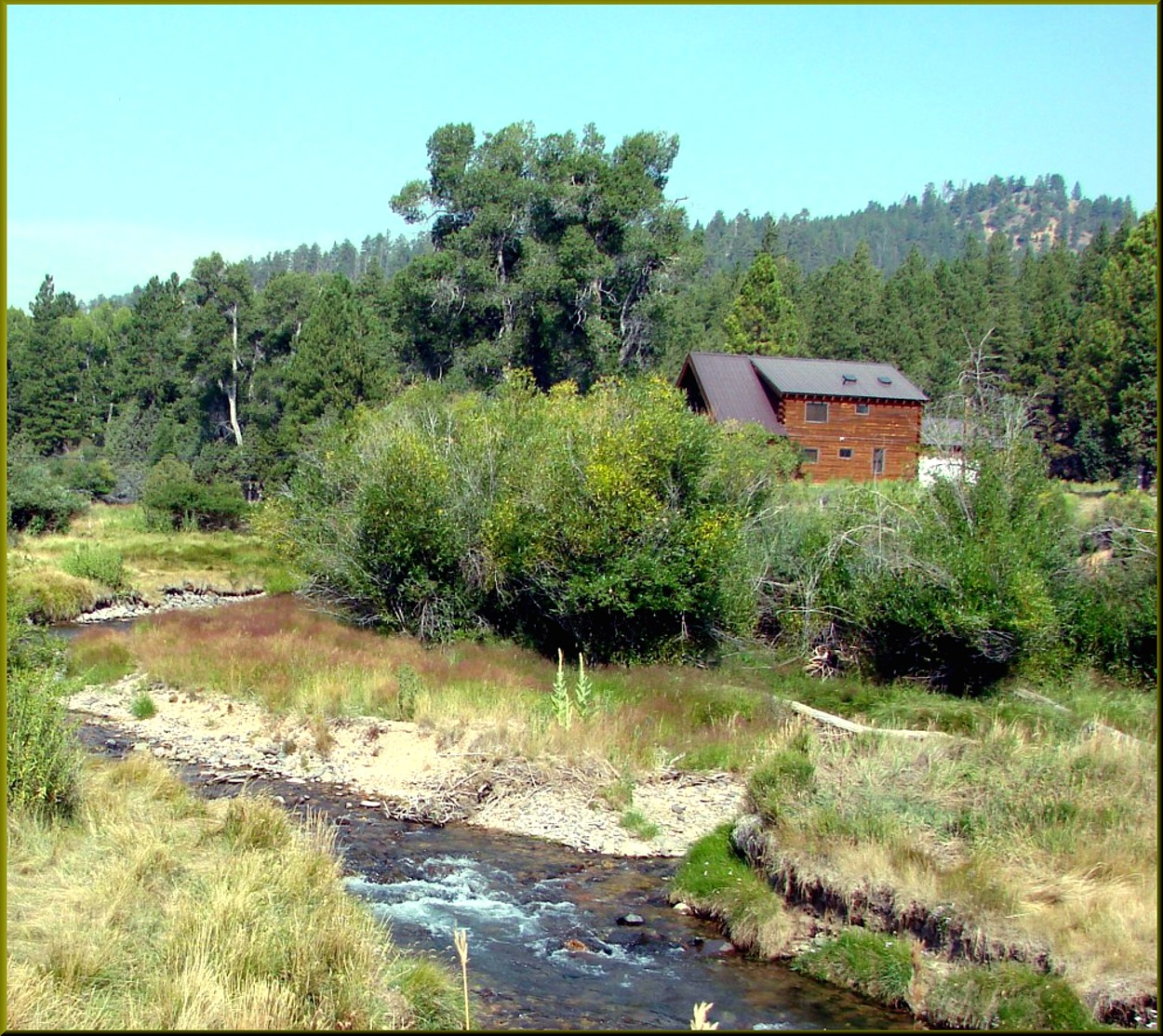
Mammoth Creek in the Dixie National Forest, September 2009

Mammoth Creek is a creek in Iron and Garfield counties in southern Utah, United States, that flows for over 20 miles (32 km) through mountains and forests from Mammoth Summit (near Brian Head, Utah), through the Mammoth Valley, to its confluence with the Sevier River (near Hatch). The creek contains wild brown trout and hatchery rainbow trout.

== See also ==
- List of rivers of Utah
