= Mammoth Valley =

Valley in Utah, United States

Coordinates: 37°36′54″N 112°32′24″W

Mammoth Valley is a depression in Southern Utah, United States, between Hatch and Duck Creek. The Mammoth Creek flows along its floor.

== History ==
Mammoth Valley was the site of a planned constitutionalist community in the late 1980s and early 1990s. Investors in the project and donors to the Meadeau View Institute in nearby Duck Creek were promised parcels in the valley. Several families built temporary residences and brought in mobile homes. During the winter of 1993, record snowfall crushed the poorly supported residences, and the families who sought to build the community left.

On January 24, 1994, the Utah Division of Real Estate ordered Meadeau View to stop marketing the Mammoth land, as the offering had not been registered with the division.

== Notable residents ==
- William H. Doughty
