= William H. Doughty =

William H. Doughty started a conservative lifestyle community, the Meadeau View Institute, and Liberty Village in Southern Utah from 1986 to the early 1990s. He was also founder of the Institute for Constitutional Education (ICE) (a splinter group of the National Center for Constitutional Studies) and a founder of George Wythe College. He was a close friend of W. Cleon Skousen. He is also mentor to Shanon Brooks and Oliver DeMille, past presidents of George Wythe.

On January 25, 1994, the Utah Division of Real Estate issued a cease-and-desist order to Doughty, ordering him to stop marketing the Mammoth land and timeshares at Liberty Village, because the offerings weren't registered with the division. As a result, the community collapsed and contributors began legal action against Doughty in an effort to recoup their losses. At least 72 families and individuals were promised land at Mammoth with "donations" ranging from $2,000 to $14,000.

In 1965, Doughty had served as president of and investment adviser to American Investment Counseling Fund, Inc., an SEC registrant. He currently resides in Mammoth Valley, Utah.

He wrote the book Track II to the 21st Century and at one time issued a monthly periodical entitled "Vision".
