= National Center for Constitutional Studies =

Organization

- Formation: 1967
- Founder: W. Cleon Skousen
- Headquarters: Washington, D.C.
- Website: https://nccs.net/

The National Center for Constitutional Studies (NCCS), formerly known as The Freemen Institute, is a conservative, religious-themed organization, founded by Latter-day Saint political writer W. Cleon Skousen.

According to the NCCS, the founding of the United States was a divine miracle. As such, the NCCS worldview and program are based on two major pillars: (1) understanding the divine guidance that has allowed the United States to thrive and (2) rejecting what it views as the sometimes tyrannical or sinful deviations of the modern U.S. federal government from that divine mold.

== History ==
The origins of NCCS began in 1967, when Skousen, a professor at Brigham Young University, organized an off-campus institute for constitutional studies. It was established as the Freeman Institute in 1971 and, in 1984, was renamed the National Center for Constitutional Studies, and its headquarters was relocated to Washington, D.C.

The center ran conferences in the 1980s and 1990s through a non-profit it controlled called "The Making of America Conferences, Inc." Board members of this non-profit included Skousen, William H. Doughty, Donald N. Sills, and Glenn Kimber. Impeached Arizona governor Evan Mecham was also a regular donor to the center.

== Leadership ==
The current CEO and chairman of the board is Zeldon Nelson Previous chairmen were:

- W. Cleon Skousen
- Andrew Allison
- Jim Bartleson
- John L. Harmer, former lieutenant governor of California
- Earl Taylor Jr.

== The Making of America controversy ==
In 1987, controversy erupted in California over the NCCS-published textbook The Making of America by W. Cleon Skousen. The book quoted a 1934 essay on slavery by Pulitzer Prize-winning historian Fred Albert Shannon that described black children as "pickaninnies"; another section stated that life for white Southerners was "a nightmare" due to "the constant fear of slave rebellion", and claimed that white slave owners were "the worst victims of slavery". The state's bicentennial commission had approved the sale of the book as a fundraising device to coincide with the 200th anniversary of the United States Constitution.

Gary K. Hart and Willie Brown demanded that then-Governor George Deukmejian fire the three members of the Bicentennial Commission who had cast "yes" votes on the sale of the book. The controversy was resolved after the commission issued an apology, stating that it had made a "serious error in judgment" by approving the sale of the book.

== Allies and popularity ==
A 2011 report by the Southern Poverty Law Center said that the NCCS had found a number of new organizational allies among "constitutionalist" groups such as the John Birch Society, the Eagle Forum, and the Oath Keepers. Additionally, in the media, the NCCS "found a powerful voice in the form of Glenn Beck, who is a Mormon himself and used his Fox News platform to advocate for NCCS books and ideas. Through Beck's sustained and energetic advocacy, once-forgotten NCCS tracts such as The 5,000 Year Leap have become unlikely bestsellers. Since the rise of the Tea Party Movement, the all-volunteer NCCS has experienced exploding interest from Tea Party-affiliated groups such as the 9.12 Project and the Tea Party Patriots. On any given Saturday, several of nearly twenty "Making of America" NCCS lecturers are giving seminars" across the United States".

At a 2010 seminar presented by the NCCS, participants were told that the Constitution came directly from a governmental system adopted by Moses and much later by the legendary Anglo-Saxon brothers Hengist and Horsa and then copied by Thomas Jefferson. Among other things specific to the amendments of the Constitution they were told that by giving women the vote the 19th Amendment violated states' rights.

== Publications ==
- The Roots of America
- The Miracle of America
- The Making of America
- The 5,000 Year Leap
- The Real Thomas Jefferson
- The Real George Washington
- The Real Benjamin Franklin
