= Common Nonsense =

2010 book by Alexander Zaitchik

Common Nonsense: Glenn Beck and the Triumph of Ignorance
- Author: Alexander Zaitchik
- Language: English
- Genre: US politics
- Publisher: Wiley
- Publication date: June 2010
- Publication place: United States
- Media type: Print
- Pages: 288
- ISBN: 0-470-55739-7

Common Nonsense: Glenn Beck and the Triumph of Ignorance is a 2010 book by investigative reporter Alexander Zaitchik. Released in June 2010, the book attempts to critically explain the life story and phenomenon of conservative host Glenn Beck.

== Publication ==
The goal was to understand who he was. It was not to write a slash-and-burn Glenn Beck is a Big Fat Idiot book. I wanted something more substantial, something that looked at Beck as an aspect of Obama-era conservatism and how he reflected that and informed it, and how he is bigger than just a rodeo clown.

— Alexander Zaitchik

In researching the book, Zaitchik moved to Tampa, Florida, where Beck began his radio career at 970 WFLA from 1999 to 2002. While there, Zaitchik spent one year compiling and reading all of Beck's material that he could find, which also included listening to four hours a day of his radio program for eight months. Moreover, Zaitchik interviewed Beck's former friends, coworkers and colleagues in order to detail his transformation from "schlock jock" to "conservative media baron", By combining examination of Beck's public statements and a look at public records, Zaitchik compiles "a tough critique of the host's history, philosophies and methods, aimed at separating fact from hyperbole." In an interview about the book, Zaitchik remarked that:

I tried my best to keep an open mind. I can honestly say that I set out to answer the question, Who Is Glenn Beck? and not simply scream about Why I Hate Glenn Beck. Once I felt that I had honestly answered that question to my satisfaction, sure, I had no affection for the guy. But I was not hired to write, and did not set out to write, your standard fill-in-the-blanks lefty hit job. There’s no fun in that, no challenge. It would have been boring to write and boring to read.

== Content ==
Zaitchik details Beck's crusade against obscure Washington, D.C. bureaucrats such as former green jobs czar Van Jones, the coke and alcohol-fueled early days in his radio career and Beck's dependence on the conspiracy theories of the John Birch Society and obscure Cold War era anti-Communist crackpots.

— New York Press

Throughout the book, Zaitchik documents how Beck progressed from being "a competitive radio DJ who belittled a rival's wife over the telephone about her miscarriage," to a nationally known TV pundit accusing the president of being a Communist and black nationalist." In the end, Zaitchik renders Beck as "part opportunist, part entertainer" who he accuses of "assembling a team of supporters to create the books, video segments, rallies and radio shows that fuel his growing legend." The book also documents Beck's "prodigious talent for rubbing people the wrong way." According to Zaitchik, "It’s just a fascinating American story, regardless of politics," noting that Beck went from a Top 40 DJ to a national political figure in the span of only a decade.

=== "The Ghost of Cleon Skousen" ===
Excerpt – Chapter 12: "The Ghost of Cleon Skousen"

As the ingredients of Beck's hard-right politics have changed throughout the years, the belief in a slowly unfolding secret plot involving enemies at home and abroad has remained the singular constant. Indeed, Beck has been quietly mainstreaming right-wing conspiracy culture for the better part of a decade. ... After joining the [Mormon] church in 1999, Beck aligned himself with the religion's ultraconservative strain, in which this paranoia thrives. ...Skousen, more than any mainstream figure on the right,...created the frame through which Beck sees the world. In this frame, powerful elites and their leftist allies seek a one-world socialist government by scheming to subvert the godly Constitution that is the sacred foundation for the Real America.

W. Cleon Skousen (1913–2006) was an American author, conservative, faith-based political theorist – as well as a prolific popularizer among Latter-day Saints of their theology. As Zaitchik tells it, "Beck basically incorporated elements of each of Skousen’s three incarnations: hysterical lying paranoid red-baiter, New World Order conspiracist, and finally Christian Constitutionalist. If you look at what Skousen and some of the other right-wing Mormons from the last century were saying, guys like Ezra Taft Benson, you realize that Beck has revived their crusades and updated their mission, almost note for note."

Common Nonsense features a chapter on Beck's influences from Skousen, whom Zaitchik argues is "Beck's favorite author and biggest influence," noting that Skousen authored four of the ten books on Beck's 9-12 Project required-reading list. Zaitchik has referred to the Skousen chapter as "the most important" and "the most interesting to research and write."

== Critical reception ==
Chris Faraone in his review for The Boston Phoenix referred to Common Nonsense as an "impressive feat" resembling "a piñata stuffed with damning testaments to Beck's astoundingly flawed character" with "stories of (Beck's) savage hypocrisy on nearly every page." Faraone goes on to remark that:

Despite mild yet cautious applause of Beck's relentless nature, Zaitchik, armed with mighty rhetorical gusto, hardly skips opportunities to harpoon his white whale ... Common Nonsense serves up far too many jaw-droppers to recount ... from Beck's coming of political age during the 2000 Florida recount and subsequent Terry Schiavo debacle, to his gloating calls for bombing runs on Baghdad, to his snorting cocaine off the dashboard of his DeLorean. Only Beck can top Beck. One day he calls victims of Hurricane Katrina 'scumbags'; the next he points to the Dow Jones Industrial Average as proof that the Bush economy was strong, heartily defends torture, and compares Republican senator Rick Santorum to Winston Churchill. This is a man who equates green jobs with reparations, AmeriCorps workers with Nazis, and environmental activism with fascism. Beck is a bomb thrower, plain and simple, and Zaitchik highlights the most pivotal turns in his twisted jihad.

The Anchorage Press deemed the book the "definitive Beck biography", while Joe Conason of Salon Magazine described the book as "gripping" and "thoroughly researched", Mark Schmitt in The American Prospect referred to the book as "superb", and applauded Zaitchik for showing how "Beck's blackboard schemes" display "the oceanic audacity of his self-serving ignorance." Creative Loafing described Zaitchik as "a talented and incisive wordsmith", supposing that "a book like Common Nonsense is intellectual defense against (Beck's) rantings that have made him a cult hero among the Tea-Party set." Henry Stern in Willamette Week opined that Zaitchik is an "engaging writer who takes down Beck with strong research and entertaining turns of phrase", while diagnosing Common Nonsense as "a useful corrective to the hagiography that Beck’s acolytes subscribe to." The Boston Globe depicted the book as "a scathing profile that follows the powerful pundit from a single-parent home in rural Washington state to conservative superstardom."

=== Beck fans reaction ===
Beck may mock himself ... but Beck has made an art of ensuring his fans rally around him no matter what. The more he's mocked, the more it feeds right into his game plan.

— Alexander Zaitchik

After the release of Common Nonsense, Zaitchik states that he sustained a "barrage of email bombs from the Beck Nation." According to Zaitchik, most of it was "triggered by religious web sites" with angry people telling him to "Go back to Russia" (where he worked for a time as a journalist) or "Go to hell." After the incident Zaitchik remarked that he "came away knowing not to underestimate the power of Glenn Beck," describing him as a "fascinating character", comprising "a blend of P.T. Barnum, Jimmy Swaggart, Aimee Semple McPherson and the old tent revivalists."

== Further reading by Zaitchik ==
- Zaitchik, Alexander (September 21, 2009). "The Making of Glenn Beck: Part I". Salon. Archived from the original on October 26, 2011.
- Zaitchik, Alexander (September 22, 2009). "Glenn Beck Becomes Damaged Goods: Part II". Salon. Archived from the original on November 23, 2011.
- Zaitchik, Alexander (September 23, 2009). "Glenn Beck Rises Again: Part III". Salon. Archived from the original on November 23, 2011.
- Glenn Beck’s Manhattan of the Mind for The New York Observer, June 8, 2010

=== Adapted excerpts from Common Nonsense ===
- Brother Beck Presents: Glenn Beck’s Mormon Masterpiece Theater
- Past is Prologue: Glenn Beck's 'Rally for America' Redux
- The Crying Conservative: How Glenn Beck Taught His Feminine Side To Turn Tricks
