= Paul Skousen =

American author

Paul Skousen is a son of W. Cleon Skousen, and is a writer of books including The Naked Socialist. He has written other books aimed at the Latter-day Saint market.

Skousen studied at Brigham Young University in communications and journalism, and at Georgetown University in national security studies. He worked as a military analyst, trainer, and watch officer for the Central Intelligence Agency, and as an intelligence officer for two years in the White House Situation Room during the Reagan Administration. He and his wife, the former Kathy Bradshaw, are the parents of ten children.

In December 2009 Skousen was involved in a discussion at BYU in which he defended the political ideas of his father. In July 2013 Skousen was interviewed on Book TV regarding The Naked Socialist.

== Works ==
- The Federalist Papers Made Easier -- The Complete and Original Text Subdivided and Annotated for Easier Understanding (2022, nonfiction, understanding The Federalist) ISBN 979-8362042851
- How to Save the Constitution -- Restoring the Principles of Liberty (2019, nonfiction, an approach to restore Constitution) ISBN 978-1693812590
- How to Read the Constitution and the Declaration of Independence (2016, nonfiction, brief introduction to America's founding documents) ISBN 978-1534853751
- Washington's Farewell Address Made Easier (2023, nonfiction, the address subdivided and annotated) ISBN 979-8396002401
- The Constitution and the Declaration of Independence -- By the Founding Fathers & Paul B Skousen (2016, nonfiction, brief introduction to America's founding documents) ISBN 978-1630729059
- A Catechism on the U.S. Constitution (2023, nonfiction, question and answer on the Constitution) ISBN 979-8397412254
- The Naked Socialist (2012, nonfiction, the story of socialism from its ancient roots to modern times) ISBN 978-1630720728
- Treasures from the Journal of Discourses (2012, nonfiction, highlights excerpted from the Journal of Discourses) ISBN 978-1630720704
- Bassam and the Seven Secret Scrolls (2014, historical novel, the camel caravan becomes a nation in miniature, teaching the 7 ideas of prosperity and principles of freedom) ISBN 978-1630720520
- Zafir and the Seventh Scroll (2016, historical novel, continuation of Bassam series) ISBN 978-1539983583
- The Search for Rasha (2018, historical novel, conclusion of Bassam series) ISBN 978-1642280098
- Comrade Paul's Socialist Bathroom Reader (2012, nonfiction, facts, tidbits and humor from socialist nations about socialism/communism) ISBN 978-1481194105
- The Skousen Book of More Amazing Mormon World Records (2008, nonfiction, a follow-on to the first records book) ISBN 978-1599550602
- Brother Paul's Mormon Bathroom Reader (2005, nonfiction, anecdotes, history, facts about Mormon (LDS) culture) ISBN 978-1555178956
- The Skousen Book of Mormon World Records (2004, nonfiction, historical anecdotes about Mormons (LDS) and their individual or membership-wide achievements) ISBN 978-1555178116
