= The Naked Communist =

1958 book by W. Cleon Skousen

- Author: W. Cleon Skousen
- Illustrator: Arnold Friberg
- Cover artist: Izzard Ink Publishing
- Language: English
- Subjects: Communism; Socialism
- Published: 1958, 2014, 2017 (Izzard Ink Publishing)
- Publication place: United States
- Pages: 398
- ISBN: 978-1630720797
- Dewey Decimal: 335.4 22
- LC Class: HX44 .S5585 2009

The Naked Communist is a 1958 anti-communist book by W. Cleon Skousen, a former FBI employee. The book has been reprinted several times and it has sold almost two million copies as of 2017.

== Content ==
The Naked Communist is a 1958 anti-communist book by American faith-based political theorist W. Cleon Skousen, a former FBI employee. The main subject of the book is an alleged communist plot to overcome and control all of the world's governments through the implementation of social progressivism and by undermining American foreign policy through the promotion of internationalism and pacifism. The early chapters of the book cover the philosophy of Marxism and Soviet Communism as well as some of the history of communist power in various countries including the Soviet Union, China and Cuba.

According to Skousen, Karl Marx and Friedrich Engels declared the six communist principles in 1847: the overthrow of capitalism, the abolition of private property, the elimination of family as a social unit, the abolition of all classes, the overthrow of all governments, and the establishment of a communist order with communal ownership of property in a classless, stateless society.

Skousen argued that the communist plan was first “to take Asia, then Africa, next Europe and finally America.” Skousen also contended that communists had 45 goals “to soften America for the final takeover.”

The 45 goals of communism were added in the 8th edition published in 1961. The 2017 edition of the book includes a new chapter asserting that 44 of the goals have been achieved in the U.S.

== Reception ==
In 1963, a portion of the book including the 45 "Current Communist Goals" was read into the United States Congressional Record.

The book was commented favorably by President Ronald Reagan and J. Edgar Hoover, first Director of the Federal Bureau of Investigation.

The book has also been highly discussed by American conservatives Glenn Beck and Ben Carson, the latter of whom stated in 2014, "The Naked Communist lays out the whole progressive plan. It is unbelievable how fast it has been achieved."

The book has been reprinted several times—most recently in a 2017 printing through Izzard Ink Publishing—and it has sold almost two million copies as of 2017.
