= Thomas Jefferson Education =

Philosophy and methodology of education

Thomas Jefferson Education, also known as "TJEd" or "Leadership Education" is a philosophy and methodology of education which is popular among some alternative educators, including private schools, charter schools and homeschoolers. It is based on the Seven Keys of Great Teaching and the Phases of Learning. This educational paradigm was popularized through the writing and teaching of Oliver and Rachel DeMille, co-authors of the TJEd resource materials.

== Phases of Leadership Education ==
TJEd prescribes a distinct approach for students of different developmental ages. These are called "Phases", and correspond with the physical/emotional/intellectual readiness for the lessons of each phase. The suggested corresponding ages are a general guide, with exceptions that vary widely. DeMille cites such developmental psychologists as Jean Piaget, Lev Vygotsky and Erik Erikson in support of their paradigm of "Phases".

=== Foundational Phases ===
The "Foundational Phases" of TJEd are as follows:

- Core (birth to 8+ years of age): right and wrong, good and bad, true and false, relationships, family values, family routines and responsibilities, learning accountability, and the value and love of work.
- Love of Learning (about 8 to 12 years of age): encourages family reading of classic literature, project learning, clubs and "Momschools" are among the elements that help inspire the youngster to love learning and to approach a variety of subjects with interest and growing levels of competence and diligence. The lessons of "Love of Learning" Phase: What's out there to learn? You're responsible for personal decisions. Personal accountability. Learning your gifts, interests, life's goals, mission. And the importance of home and family.

=== Educational Phases ===
The "Educational Phases" are as follows:

- Scholar (approximately 12 to 18 years of age): adolescent students study long hours and work with a mentor to refine their academic skills—the emphasis placed on cultural literacy and a personalized approach to studies.
- Depth (approximately 18 to 24 years of age): students submit to a mentor-guided program, whether privately or in a formal college setting or a "mission". The seven lessons of depth phase: 1. Initiative 2. Ingenuity 3. Allegiance 4. Integrity 5. Commitment 6. Passion 7. Impact

=== Applicational Phases ===
The "Applicational [sic] Phases" are as follows:

- Mission (approximately 25 to 45 years of age): the individual continues in self-education as he or she builds family and community through professional vocations, entrepreneurship, social leadership or some other focus.
- Impact (approximately 45 to 65 years of age, and beyond): the individual asserts leadership on a broader scale as an "elder" in society, acting as a mentor, philosopher, philanthropist, artist, community leader and generational elder in the family.

The books note that while the above timeline is in some respects ideal, it is possible to "renegotiate" lost lessons from previous phases, and "catch up" to the natural flow of the Phases.

== 5 Pillar Certification ==
TJEd parents and educators wanting an introduction to teaching through the classics can receive orientation and training to do so by completing The Five Pillar Certification. The Five Pillars of Statesmanship are: Classics, Mentors, Simulations, Field Experience and God. Certification endorses an individual’s knowledge and ability in the Classics/Mentors approach to teaching leaders by incorporating all Five Pillars into an overall system of education. The 5 Pillar Certification program is divided into three levels to facilitate progress.

Level I is an introduction to the Five Pillars and the Classics/Mentors model of education includes attending a seminar, submitting a form to a facilitator, and reading and discussing the following books: The Chosen, Jane Eyre, Lonesome Gods, Little Britches, Laddie, The Merchant of Venice, and A Thomas Jefferson Education.

Level II is a comprehensive study of additional classics. It also requires seminar attendance and a reading and one-page summary for 12 of the following books: Pride and Prejudice, "What is Seen and What is Not Seen" from Essays on Political Economy, The One Minute Teacher, The 7 Habits of Highly Effective People, Leadership Education: The Phases of Learning, Great Expectations, Alas, Babylon, Multiple Intelligences, "The 7 Lesson School Teacher" from Dumbing Us Down, Market-Based Education, How Children Learn, Les Misérables, Spiritual Lives of the Great Composers, The Abolition of Man, Understanding the Times, Uncle Tom’s Cabin, The Fourth Turning, Walden, and The Virginian.

Level III is considered a practical application of the Five Pillars in an educational setting. One must administrate or teach in a public, private or home school or class and apply the 5 Pillar system for a minimum of six months; keep a journal of the entire project and write a project summary when the project is complete; pass an oral board covering the content of the three levels, as well as the practicum; and attend a seminar.

== Related works ==
- A Thomas Jefferson Education: Teaching a Generation of Leaders for the Twenty-first Century (1st edition, softbound, 2000; 2nd edition hardback 2006; 2nd edition softbound 2009; by Oliver DeMille; published by TJEdOnline)
- A Thomas Jefferson Education Home Companion (2006, Oliver DeMille, Rachel DeMille and Diann Jeppson; published by George Wythe University Press)
- Leadership Education: The Phases of Learning (2010, Oliver and Rachel DeMille; published by TJEdOnline)
- Thomas Jefferson Education for Teens (2009, with Shanon Brooks; published by TJEdOnline)
- The Student Whisperer (2011, with Tiffany Earl; published by TJEdOnline)
- A Call to Reinvent Liberal Arts Education Ted.com (2009 February, Liz Coleman, president of Bennington College)
- The Element (2009, Ken Robinson, Penguin Books)

* Additional Reading

- Liberal Arts Education wikipedia page for history of, usage of in history and usage of around the world
- The Education of Jim Rohn
- "Do Schools Kill Creativity" Ted Talk by Ken Robinson 2006
- "Changing Education Paradigms" Ted Talk by Ken Robinson 2010
- See Adler, Reforming American Education
- Bacon, Novum Organum
- Barton, What Happened in Education?
- Barzun, Teacher in America
- Bloom, A., The Closing of the American Mind
- Bloom, H., The Wester Cannon
- Bloomenfeld, How to Tutor
- Bloomenfeld, The Illiterates
- Bunding, An Education for Our Time
- Colfax, Home Schooling for Excellence
- Covey, First Things First
- Dewey, The School and Society
- Emerson, The American Scholar
- Gardner, Multiple Intelligences
- Gardner, The Unschooled Mind
- Gatto, Dumbing Us Down
- Gatto, The Exhausted School
- Glasser, The Quality School
- Harward, A Market Approach to Education
- Hirsch, Cultural Literacy
- Hirsch, et al., The Dictionary of Cultural Literacy
- Holt, How Children Fail
- Holt, How Children Learn
- Hutchins, The Higher Learning in America
- Kirk, Redeeming the Times
- Lewis, The Abolition of Man
- Mason, The Original Home School Series (6 vol.)
- Montessori, all writings
- Nash, The Closing of the American Heart
- Noebel, Understanding the Times
- Ortegta y Gasset, Mission of the University
- Perelman, School's Out
- Pudewa, all writings
- Smith, Killing the Spirit
- Strauss and Howe, The Fourth Turning
- Swanson, The Education of James Madison
- Taylor, The Healing Power of Stories
- Toffler, Futureshock
- Van Doren, Liberal Education
