= Mark Schmitt =

American political scientist

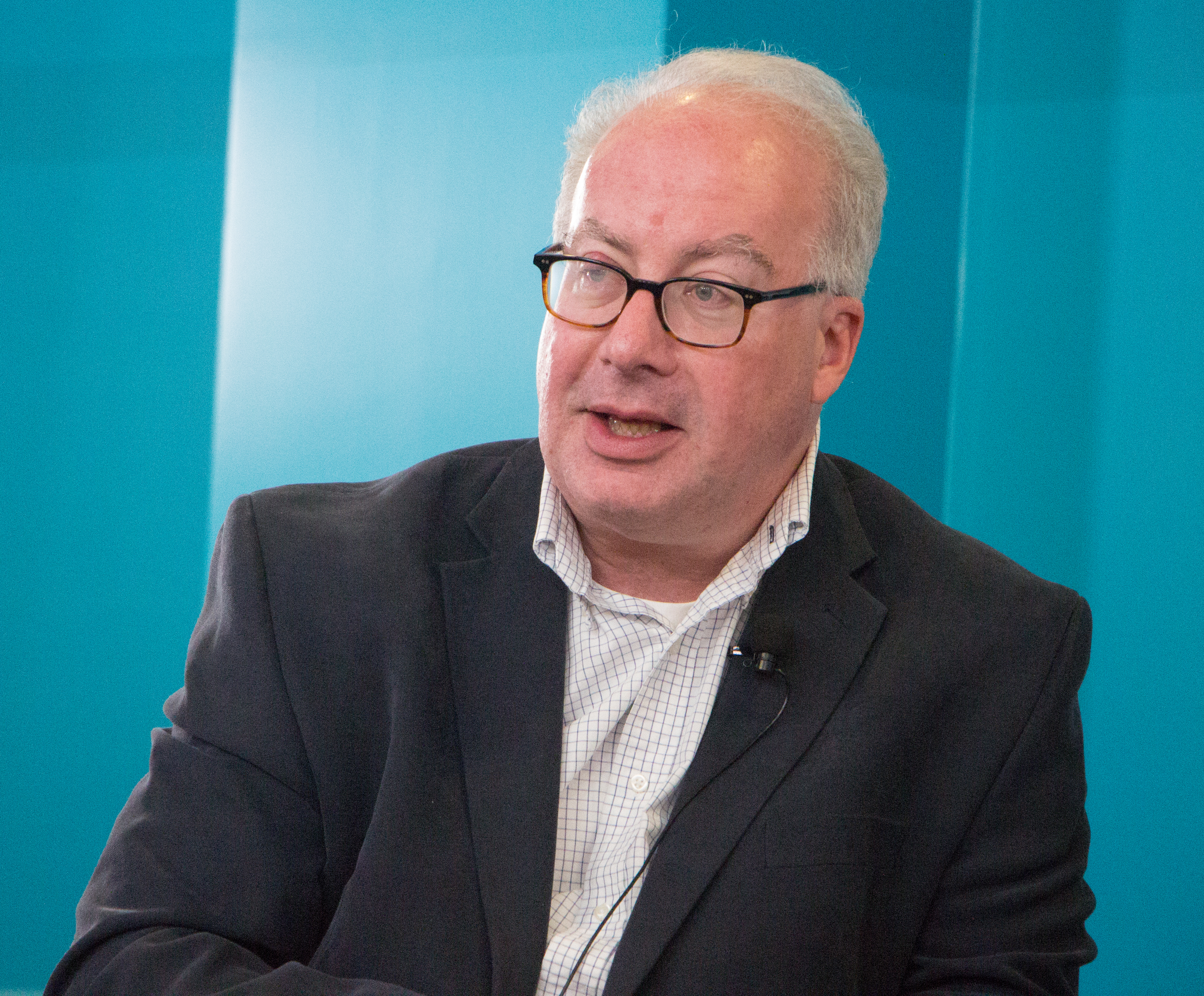
- Education: Yale University (BA)
- Occupations: Political scientist, author, editor
- Known for: Senior Director of Political Reform at the New America; Former Executive Editor of The American Prospect

Mark Schmitt is an American political scientist and author, and is Director of Studies and of the Political Reform Program at the New America Foundation.

== Biography ==
Schmitt has written extensively on budget and tax policy, and on the history and role of ideas in politics. In 2005, Mr. Schmitt began a monthly column, "The Out Years," in The American Prospect; in 2009, he changed the name of the column to "Ways and Means". Mr. Schmitt has also written for The New Republic, The Financial Times, and many other publications, and has contributed chapters to numerous books. In 2003, he launched The Decembrist, which was named one of the five best political blogs in 2004 by Forbes, but which has been inactive since 2008.

Schmitt is the Roosevelt Institute's Senior Fellow and Director of the Fellows Program. Before that he was executive editor of The American Prospect, a position he held since 2008. He guided the Prospect during a period when it won several awards, including the Utne Reader award for best political magazine, for its coverage of the policy and political battles of the first two years of the Obama administration. Schmitt was policy director to former Senator Bill Bradley in the 1990s and a senior advisor on Bradley's 2000 presidential campaign. From 1998 to 2005, he directed a program on political reform at George Soros's Open Society Institute. Before joining the Prospect, he was a senior fellow at the New America Foundation. He earned his bachelor's degree from Yale in 1983.
