= Alexander Zaitchik =

American freelance journalist (born 1974)

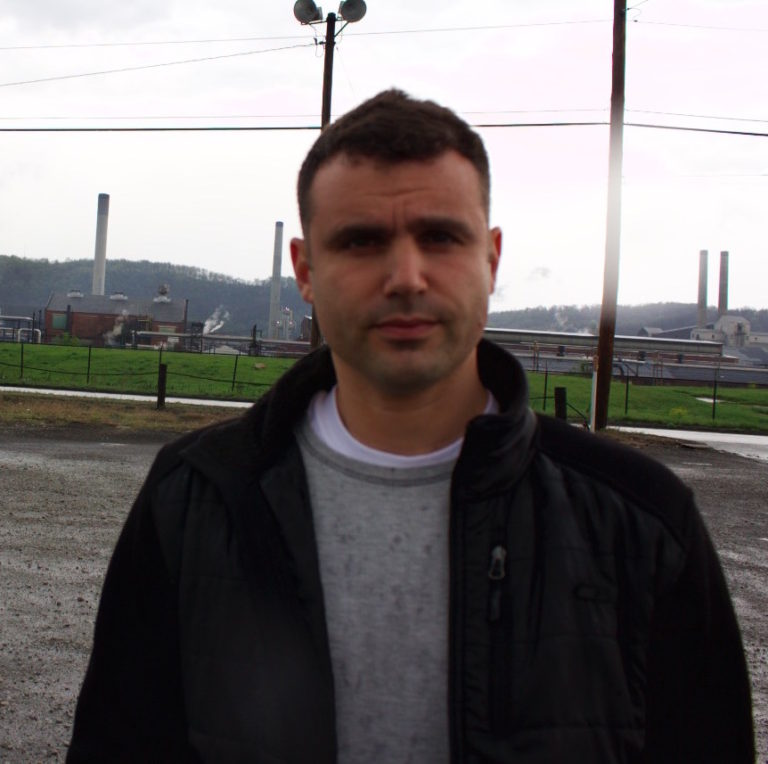
- Born: November 22, 1974 (age 51); Boston, Massachusetts, U.S.
- Occupation: freelance journalist
- Years active: 1998–present
- Website: Official website

Alexander Zaitchik is an American freelance journalist who writes on politics, media, and the environment. He has written for The Nation, The New Republic, the Intercept, Rolling Stone, the Guardian, Foreign Policy, the Baffler, the International Herald Tribune, Wired, the San Francisco Chronicle, and The Believer, among others. He was a staff writer and editor at the New York Press, the eXile in Moscow, and was the founding editor at the Prague Pill, an alternative newspaper in the Czech Republic.

== Books ==
His first book, Common Nonsense: Glenn Beck and the Triumph of Ignorance, was published by John Wiley & Sons in June 2010. Political philosopher Mark Lilla called the book, a "sharp and informative smackdown." His second book, "The Gilded Rage: A Wild Ride Through Donald Trump's America" was published by Skyhorse Publishing in August 2016. Writing in the Sacramento Bee, syndicated columnist Ben Boychuk called the book “[o]ne of the most important and overlooked books of the 2016 campaign season.” His third book, Out of the Ooze: The Story of Dr. Tom Price was published by Strong Arm Press as an eBook in June 2017. Zaitchik's fourth book, "Owning The Sun: A People's History of Monopoly Medicine from Aspirin to COVID-19" was published by Counterpoint Press in March 2021. Kirkus Reviews called Owning the Sun “A brave and timely reminder… A trenchant study of the dangers of turning medical knowledge into private intellectual property.” Publishers Weekly said Zaitchik " takes readers through the labyrinthine history of medical patents in this expansive study… Zaitchik covers a remarkable amount of ground and never gets lost in the weeds. The result is comprehensive and illuminating.” Representative Lloyd Doggett praised Zaitchik, writing "With so many Americans unable to afford ever soaring drug prices, Zaitchik’s important [and] insightful history of the rise of Big Pharma demonstrates the urgency of restraining pharmaceutical monopoly power.”

== Further reading by Alexander Zaitchik ==
- "Interview: Alexander Zaitchik on his new biography of Glenn Beck, Common Nonsense", The Washington Post
- Interview with BillMoyers.com about The Gilded Rage.
- "Rainforest on Fire,", The Intercept
- "The Zealot: Larry Pratt Is the Gun Lobby's Secret Weapon", Rolling Stone
- "Greenland Dispatch: Europe's Last Colony And The Big Melt", The New Republic
- "Where Did David Brooks Get the Bizarre Idea That the Tea Party Crowd Resembles '60s Movements?", History News Network
- "Illusions of Grandeur", Foreign Policy
- "After the Deluge", The New Republic
- "A hippy song for a political ad? Only Bernie Sanders can pull that off", The Guardian
- "American Shaman: The Incredible Story of Lucas Weiss", Men's Journal
- "At Trump’s Coronation, Alex Jones Is King", The New Republic
- "Talking About Nukes?", Vice Media
- "On Native Grounds", The Baffler
- "Water is Life", The Intercept
- "How Conservation Became Colonialism", Foreign Policy
- "A Letter From New Orleans on Edge", Sierra Magazine
- "Is Josh Hawley For Real?", The New Republic
- "R.I.P., Kill Your TV", The Baffler
- "This Is How Bernie Wins", The New Republic
- "Dispatches from Mississippi", The Intercept
- "No Vaccine in Sight", The New Republic
- "How to Break a Big Pharma Monopoly on a Covid-19 Vaccine ", The New Republic
- "The Forever Disease", The New Republic
- "How Bill Gates Impeded Global Access to Covid Vaccines", The New Republic
- "The Great American Science Heist", The Intercept

=== Audio & Video ===
- Alexander Zaitchik on "The Church of Beck" – July 15, 2010 appearance from Countdown with Keith Olbermann
- Zaitchik on Common Nonsense: Glenn Beck and the Triumph of Ignorance – interview by Democracy Now!
- "Book Discussion on Common Nonsense: Glenn Beck and the Triumph of Ignorance". www.c-span.org. C-SPAN. 8 July 2010.
- "Author’s wild ride through Donald’s Trump’s America" - August 27, 2016 interview on MSNBC
- "Vaccines Don’t Make Money" - interview on The Politics of Everything podcast hosted by The New Republic on June 3, 2020
- Interview with Doug Henwood on his Behind The News podcast about Owning The Sun released on March 10, 2022
