= Donald N. Sills =

Dr. Donald N. Sills (February 14, 1937 - June 15, 2010) was a Baptist minister and one of the founders of George Wythe College, and previous chairman of the George Wythe Foundation Board of Trustees. He served as the first president of George Wythe College (now known as George Wythe University), and was succeeded by Oliver DeMille.

Sills has served as a minister for over 50 years and has spoken from the pulpit in over 25 countries around the world.

Sills has been in films, appeared on hundreds of broadcast radio and television programs, including the Phil Donahue Show, Larry King Live, and Pat Robertson’s The 700 Club. He has served as Chaplain for the World Conference of Mayors, president of the Coalition for Religious Freedom, executive director for the World Council for Religious Liberty in Geneva, Switzerland, and president of the Texas-based Family Entertainment Network. Along with W. Cleon Skousen, he taught "The Making of America Conferences" internationally.

Don Sills died the night of June 15, 2010 during his sleep.
