= George Wythe University =

Unaccredited liberal arts college

Coordinates: 37.638279°N 113.250053°W

- Motto: Building Statesmen
- Type: Private, liberal arts, unaccredited
- Active: September 1992–August 2016
- Endowment: None
- Location: Salt Lake City, Utah, United States
- Website: http://www.gw.edu

George Wythe University (GWU) was an unaccredited, non-profit university in Salt Lake City, Utah. GWU's curriculum borrowed from the Great Books of the Western World published in 1952 by Britannica and it claimed that its methodology was based on the Socratic seminar and Oxford tutorial system. The school was named in honor of George Wythe, mentor to Thomas Jefferson. The college closed in August 2016.

According to the Salt Lake Tribune, "the education at George Wythe University is unorthodox and undoubtedly conservative, pushing a small-government vision, and has roots in the teachings of Cleon Skousen". Skousen is "a significant figure in far-right politics", a frequent speaker for the John Birch Society, and was portrayed on the cover of its magazine.

The university received "bad publicity for awarding degrees students never really earned", based on administrators granting "life experience credits". In a highly unusual move, the Utah Division of Consumer Protection required the university to end operations in August 2016 because its degrees were of questionable value and the university was misleading students.

== History ==
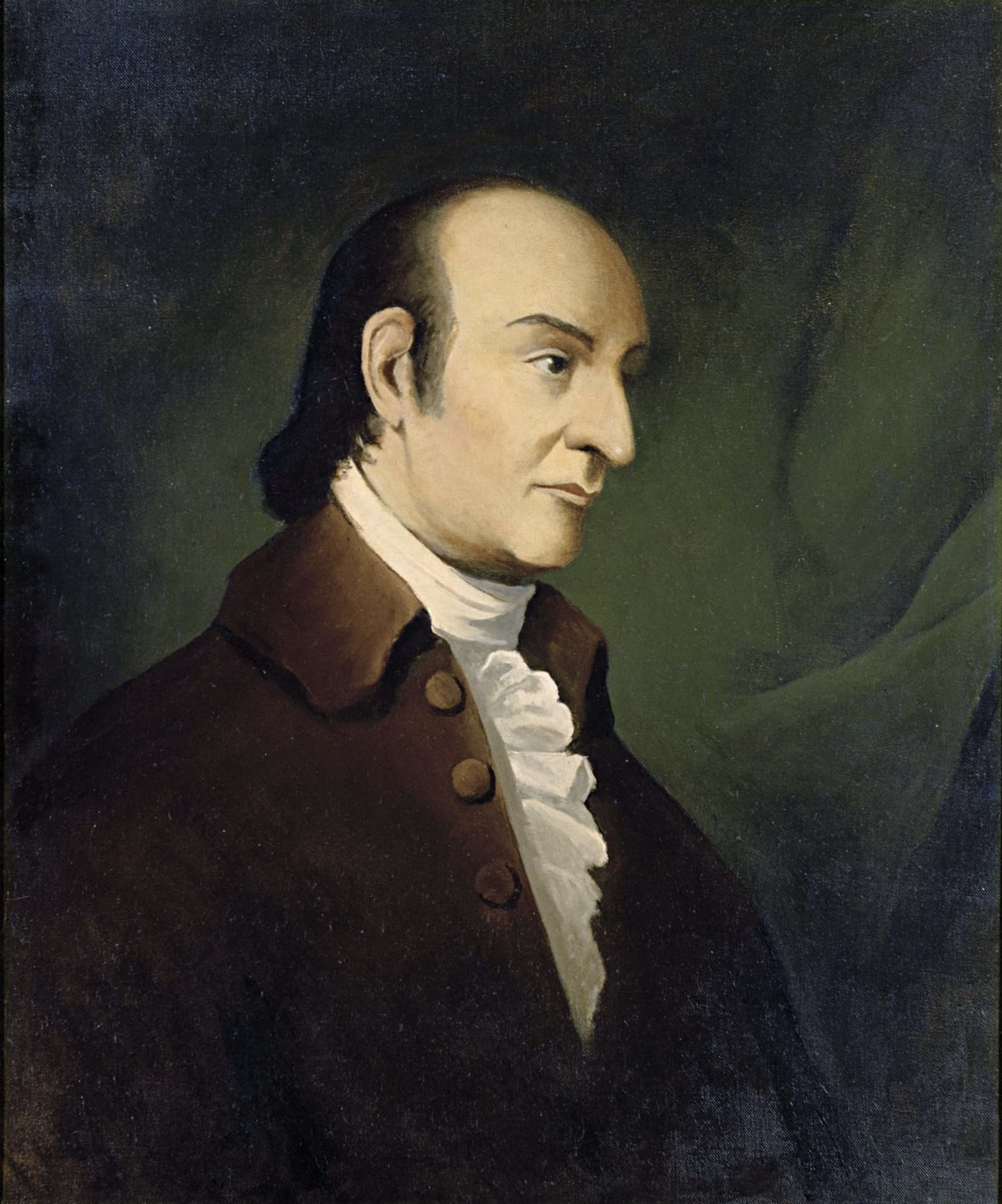
George Wythe, the university's namesake

=== Founding ===
George Wythe College (GWC) was organized in 1992 as a subsidiary of the Institute for Constitutional Education with Donald N. Sills as president. The school opened that fall as a Utah branch of Coral Ridge Baptist University (CRBU). Over the next several years the school awarded bachelors, masters, and doctoral degrees across a range of subjects, including finance, youth and family counseling, history, Near Eastern Studies, and education. In 1997 a steering committee formalized the school's comprehensive academic program, integrating the methodology, motto and mission into a cohesive liberal arts model which it called the Five Pillars of Statesmanship. In 1999, George Wythe Foundation was created to commence fundraising efforts, and by 2000 the college expanded its faculty and administration to include 13 employees plus support staff.

=== Independence and growth ===
In January 2002, the college became independent from CRBU through a transfer of ownership to George Wythe Foundation. At this time the school realigned its policies and narrowed its degree programs to the four specific degrees that most closely matched its mission, namely: B.A in Statesmanship; M.A. degrees in Political Economy and Education; and a Ph.D in Constitutional Law. This notably reduced the religious emphasis that existed previously.

=== Expansion ===
In 2006 a master plan was presented for reorganizing under a university model with multiple colleges on several campuses. In August 2008 the school announced the designation of "university" status granted by the State of Utah, and the Board decision to formally adopt the change, as it broke ground on its second campus in Monticello, Utah. At this same groundbreaking ceremony it was also announced that the school's leadership would assume new titles under the university model, with head administrator Shanon Brooks being named university president and chief academic Oliver DeMille receiving the title of chancellor. Temporary remote headquarters were set up in a local historical monument known as the Hyland Hotel and classes were held with 19 students. Intentions for a third campus were announced for Alberta, Canada.

In February 2009 the school announced plans to offer live online classes. This announcement coincided with the resignation of Brooks as president, the appointment of Andrew Groft as the university's interim president, and the cancellation of the chancellor model incident to the retirement of DeMille, due to health problems.

In April 2012, the Board of Trustees announced a feasibility study rejecting Monticello as a viable campus site and returned the donated land.

In October 2015, the new administration announced that it had been looking at options for being acquired, which it intended to complete by August 2016.

== Alumni ==
- Jim Hillyer, elected Member of Parliament (MP) in the House of Commons of Canada for Lethbridge in the 2011 general election
