= Duck Creek Village, Utah =

Unincorporated community in the state of Utah, United States

Duck Creek Village
- Unincorporated community
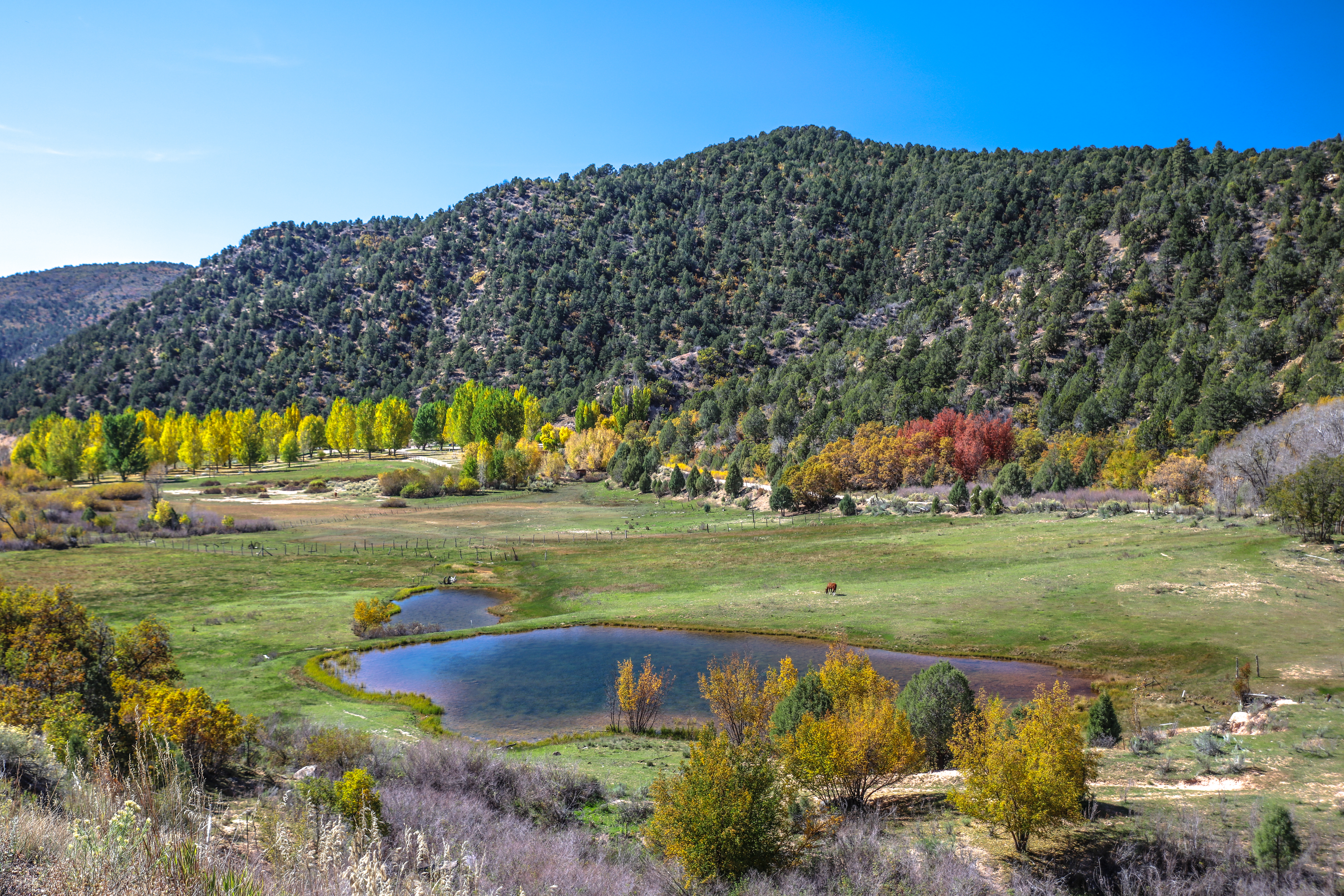
- Duke Lake at Duck Creek Village, October 2015

- Location within the state of Utah
- Coordinates: 37°31′25″N 112°39′47″W
- Country: United States
- State: Utah
- County: Kane
- Elevation: 8,507 ft (2,593 m)
- Time zone: UTC-7 (Mountain (MST))
  - Summer (DST): UTC-6 (MDT)
- ZIP codes: 84762
- GNIS feature ID: 1954629U.S. Geological Survey Geographic Names Information System: Duck Creek Village, Utah

Duck Creek Village is an unincorporated community in Kane County, Utah, United States.

== Description ==
The community is located on the edge of Cedar Mountain, with an elevation of 8,507 feet (2,593 m). Duck Creek Village has a post office with the ZIP code of 84762.
