= Hatch, Utah =

Town in the state of Utah, United States

- Town
- Location in Garfield County and state of Utah
- Coordinates: 37°39′3″N 112°26′8″W
- Country: United States
- State: Utah
- County: Garfield
- Incorporated: January 3, 1934
- Founder: Meltiar Hatch, Sr.

Government
  - Mayor: Mayor Jim Kabonic
  - Town Clerk: Jacie Torgersen

Area
  - Total: 1.82 sq mi (4.72 km^{2})
  - Land: 1.82 sq mi (4.72 km^{2})
  - Water: 0 sq mi (0.00 km^{2})
- Elevation: 6,919 ft (2,109 m)

Population (2020)
  - Total: 132
  - Estimate (2019): 142
  - Density: 77.9/sq mi (30.06/km^{2})
- Time zone: UTC-7 (Mountain (MST))
  - Summer (DST): UTC-6 (MDT)
- ZIP code: 84735
- Area code: 435
- FIPS code: 49-33760
- GNIS feature ID: 1428572
- Website: hatchutah.gov

Hatch is a town in Garfield County, Utah, United States. The population was 132 at the 2020 census. It is 260 miles (420 km) south of Salt Lake City.

== History ==
Hatch was originally called "Mammoth", and under the latter name was settled in 1872. A post office called Hatch has been in operation since 1904. The present name is after Meltiar Hatch, a pioneer citizen.

== Geography ==
Hatch is located in southwestern Garfield County, in the valley of the Sevier River near its headwaters. U.S. Route 89 passes through the town, leading north 15 miles (24 km) to Panguitch, the county seat, and south 26 miles (42 km) to Glendale.

According to the United States Census Bureau, the town has a total area of 0.46 square miles (1.2 km^{2}), all land.

== Demographics ==
Historical population
Census	Pop.	Note	%±
1920	250		—
1930	274		9.6%
1940	294		7.3%
1950	244		−17.0%
1960	198		−18.9%
1970	139		−29.8%
1980	121		−12.9%
1990	103		−14.9%
2000	127		23.3%
2010	133		4.7%
2020	132		−0.8%
U.S. Decennial Census

As of the census of 2000, there were 127 people, 41 households, and 33 families residing in the town. The population density was 471.7 people per square mile (181.6/km^{2}). There were 81 housing units at an average density of 300.8 per square mile (115.8/km^{2}). The racial makeup of the town was 93.70% White, 3.94% Asian, and 2.36% from two or more races. Hispanic or Latino of any race were 1.57% of the population.

There were 41 households, out of which 39.0% had children under 18 living with them, 63.4% were married couples living together, 9.8% had a female householder with no husband present, and 19.5% were non-families. 17.1% of all households were made up of individuals, and 7.3% had someone living alone who was 65 years of age or older. The average household size was 3.10, and the average family size was 3.48.

In the town, the population was spread out, with 33.1% under 18, 11.0% from 18 to 24, 22.0% from 25 to 44, 20.5% from 45 to 64, and 13.4% who were 65 years of age or older. The median age was 28 years. For every 100 females, there were 76.4 males. For every 100 females aged 18 and over, there were 77.1 males.

The median income for a household in the town was $37,083, and the median income for a family was $45,000. Males had a median income of $27,083 versus $25,938 for females. The per capita income for the town was $12,776. There were 5.9% of families and 2.9% of the population living below the poverty line, including no under eighteens and 28.6% of those over 64.

In the summer of 2010, the town began constructing a new town office/community center facility adjacent to the town park that will be completed in the fall of 2010.

== Climate ==
The climate in this area has mild differences between highs and lows, and there is adequate rainfall year-round. The Köppen Climate Classification subtype for this climate is "Cfb" (Marine West Coast Climate/Oceanic climate).

Climate data for Hatch, Utah, 1991–2020 normals: 6893ft (2101m)
Month	Jan	Feb	Mar	Apr	May	Jun	Jul	Aug	Sep	Oct	Nov	Dec	Year
Mean daily maximum °F (°C)	40.0 (4.4)	43.2 (6.2)	52.8 (11.6)	59.5 (15.3)	68.4 (20.2)	79.3 (26.3)	84.6 (29.2)	81.9 (27.7)	75.1 (23.9)	65.0 (18.3)	51.1 (10.6)	41.1 (5.1)	61.8 (16.6)
Daily mean °F (°C)	24.5 (−4.2)	29.0 (−1.7)	36.0 (2.2)	42.4 (5.8)	49.7 (9.8)	58.4 (14.7)	65.1 (18.4)	63.0 (17.2)	55.1 (12.8)	45.6 (7.6)	33.5 (0.8)	25.3 (−3.7)	44.0 (6.6)
Mean daily minimum °F (°C)	8.9 (−12.8)	14.7 (−9.6)	19.2 (−7.1)	25.3 (−3.7)	31.0 (−0.6)	37.4 (3.0)	45.6 (7.6)	44.1 (6.7)	35.0 (1.7)	26.1 (−3.3)	15.9 (−8.9)	9.5 (−12.5)	26.1 (−3.3)
Average precipitation inches (mm)	1.10 (28)	1.12 (28)	1.10 (28)	0.80 (20)	0.78 (20)	0.44 (11)	1.49 (38)	1.58 (40)	1.45 (37)	1.40 (36)	0.83 (21)	1.08 (27)	13.17 (334)
Average snowfall inches (cm)	12.90 (32.8)	10.40 (26.4)	6.80 (17.3)	3.80 (9.7)	0.30 (0.76)	0.20 (0.51)	0.00 (0.00)	0.00 (0.00)	0.00 (0.00)	1.20 (3.0)	5.50 (14.0)	11.80 (30.0)	52.9 (134.47)
Source: NOAA
