= W. Cleon Skousen =

American law enforcement officer and author (1913–2006)

- Born: Willard Cleon Skousen; January 20, 1913; Raymond, Alberta, Canada
- Died: January 9, 2006 (aged 92); Salt Lake City, Utah, U.S.
- Education: San Bernardino Valley College; George Washington University (LLB)
- Occupations: Law enforcement University professor Political speaker
- Spouse: Jewel Pitcher (m. 1936)
- Children: Paul Skousen
- Relatives: Nephews: Joel Skousen, Royal Skousen, Mark Skousen
- Writing career
- Genres: Politics; Religion
- Subjects: Mormonism; Anti-communism; Early American history
- Notable works: Five Thousand Year Leap; The Naked Communist
- Website: skousen2000.com (archived)

Willard Cleon Skousen (/ˈskaʊzən/; January 20, 1913 – January 9, 2006) was an American law enforcement officer and conservative and nationalist author associated with the John Birch Society.

In addition to his role as a notable anti-communist and supporter of the John Birch Society, Skousen had a significant influence on Mormonism. He served as a prominent figure within The Church of Jesus Christ of Latter-day Saints (LDS Church), contributing to Mormon literature and theology. Skousen's works often reflected his Mormon beliefs and included discussions on Mormon eschatology, which is the study of the end times according to LDS Church teachings.

While his writings covered a wide range of subjects including the Six-Day War, New World Order conspiracies, and parenting, his influence within Mormonism stemmed from his interpretations of LDS doctrine and his efforts to promote conservative values within the faith community. Skousen's impact on Mormonism is a significant aspect of his legacy within both religious and political spheres. Two of his most popular works, The Five Thousand Year Leap and The Naked Communist, also resonated with audiences within the LDS community, further solidifying his influence in both realms.

== Early life and education ==
Skousen was born on a dryland farm in Raymond, Alberta, Canada, the second of nine children of Royal Pratt Skousen and Margarita Bentley Skousen, who were U.S. citizens. He lived in Canada until he was ten years old, then moved with his family to California where his father supervised the paving of some of the original Route 66. In 1926, Skousen went to the Mormon colony, Colonia Juárez, Chihuahua, Mexico, for two years to help his seriously ill grandmother. While there, he attended the Juarez Academy and was employed for a time as a race horse jockey. Skousen then returned to California, graduating from high school in 1930. At the age of 17 he traveled to Great Britain as a missionary for the Church of Jesus Christ of Latter-day Saints (LDS Church).

After completing his missionary service, Skousen attended San Bernardino Valley Jr. College, graduating in 1935. He married Jewel Pitcher in August 1936, and they raised eight children together. He graduated with an LL.B. from George Washington University Law School in June 1940 (the school updated his degree as Juris Doctor (J.D.) in 1972 with its degree nomenclature).

== Professional life ==
In June 1935, Skousen went to work for the Agricultural Adjustment Administration, a New Deal program to subsidize farmers. Soon thereafter, he found employment with the Federal Bureau of Investigation (FBI), working as a messenger while attending law school at night. In 1940, after passing the Washington, D.C., bar exam, he became an FBI Special Agent. FBI memos have described his work at the Bureau as mainly clerical and administrative. Skousen left the FBI in 1951. The FBI would maintain a file on Skousen that would come to number more than 2,000 pages.

From 1951 to 1955, he taught at Brigham Young University (BYU) in Provo, Utah. In 1956, Salt Lake City mayor Adiel F. Stewart hired Skousen to serve as police chief in the wake of a police department scandal. Skousen was a well-respected police chief for nearly four years.

In 1960, newly elected mayor J. Bracken Lee dismissed Skousen shortly after Skousen raided an illegal poker club where Lee was in attendance. National Review commentator Mark Hemingway characterized the gathering as "a friendly card game." Skousen supporters protested the abrupt firing by disrupting a city council meeting and planting burning crosses on Lee's lawn. Lee characterized Skousen's strict enforcement of anti-gambling laws as Gestapo-like. Lee said that although Skousen was an anti-communist, he "ran the police department in exactly the same manner as the Communists in Russia operate their government." Time magazine reported in 1960 that Skousen's "real offense seemed to be that he had failed to show enough enthusiasm for Lee's determination to slash the police-department budget." Lee told a friend that Skousen was "one of the greatest spenders of public funds of anyone who ever served in any capacity in Salt Lake City government", and a "master of half truths".

The National Center for Constitutional Studies (NCCS), an organization founded by Skousen, claimed that Skousen had eliminated the sources of illegal activity in the city by 1959. The group asserts that after Skousen's firing, his model police programs were dismantled, and crime increased, on the average, by 22%.

Skousen continued his involvement in law enforcement issues by working as the editor of the police journal Law and Order for fifteen years. He also served as field director for the American Security Council, but an increasing perception of paranoia resulted in his abrupt termination in 1962. In 1967 he was hired as a BYU religion professor by Ernest L. Wilkinson, BYU's 7th president. Other professors in the religion department were very critical of his hiring, believing he was unqualified for the position and was only hired because of his conservative viewpoints. Dallin H. Oaks, Wilkinson's successor, attempted to separate politics from BYU in his dealings with Skousen. During the Oaks administration, Skousen claimed to have been authorized to teach a new course about "Priesthood and Righteous Government", which would be published clandestinely under the name "Gospel Principles and Practices". This course was intended to be for ultra-conservative students to inform them of what to do about communist infiltration. Upon learning of Skousen's intentions, Oaks informed the First Presidency that he would not be permitted to teach that course. Skousen was told to stop mixing church doctrine and politics and to stop activities associated with his educational politics-based organization called the Freemen Institute, now known as the National Center for Constitutional Studies. However, he largely ignored this instruction, and continued teaching his version of politically infused doctrine until his retirement from BYU in 1978.

== Political life ==
After losing his police job, Skousen founded a group called the All-American Society, which Time magazine described in 1961 as an "exemplar of the far-right ultras." Throughout the 1960s, Skousen was also admired by members and leaders of the John Birch Society, although members of the more mainstream conservative movement and the American Security Council snubbed him out of fear that his controversial views would hurt the credibility of the conservative movement. Skousen used Birch Society magazines as source and reference material, and was pictured on the cover of its magazine, American Opinion. Although he was never officially a member of the organization, he was a member of its speakers' bureau and lectured at John Birch Society events throughout the United States for many years. A 1962 FBI memo described Skousen as affiliating with an "extreme right-wing" group which was promoting "anticommunism for obvious financial purposes". Skousen authored a pamphlet titled The Communist Attack on the John Birch Society, characterizing criticism of the Society as incipient communism.

Although Skousen was not a tax protester, he campaigned for several proposals to eliminate the federal income tax. One, the proposed Liberty Amendment, would have precluded the federal government from involvement in any activities that competed with private enterprise and transferred federally-owned land to the states.

In 1970, the LDS Church was under considerable attack for its refusal to ordain Black people into its priesthood. In response, Skousen penned an article, "The Communist Attack on the Mormons," in which he accused critics of "distorting the religious tenet of the Church regarding the Negro and blowing it up to ridiculous proportions" and of serving as Communist dupes. The LDS Church altered its stance in the 1978 Revelation on Priesthood.

In 1971, Skousen founded a non-profit educational foundation, The Freeman Institute. In 1982, it became the National Center for Constitutional Studies (NCCS), a national organization headquartered in Malta, Idaho.

Skousen had support among many Latter-day Saints in the 1960s and early 1970s. However, by 1979, the First Presidency issued a letter against promoting Skousen in LDS wards and stakes by stating, "This instruction is not intended to express any disapproval of the right of the Freemen Institute and its lecturers to conduct such meetings or of the contents of the lectures. The only purpose is to make certain that neither Church facilities nor Church meetings are used to advertise such events and to avoid any implication that the Church endorses what is said during such lectures."

In 1981, the first year of Ronald Reagan's presidency, Skousen was asked to be a charter member of the conservative thinktank the Council for National Policy, founded by Tim LaHaye, who was later author of the Left Behind series of books. Other early participants included Paul Weyrich; Phyllis Schlafly; Robert Grant; Howard Phillips, a former Republican affiliated with the Constitution Party; Richard Viguerie, the direct-mail specialist; and Morton Blackwell, a Louisiana and Virginia activist who is considered a specialist on the rules of the Republican Party. Skousen's proposals with the group included a plan to convert the Social Security system to private retirement accounts as well as a plan that he claimed would completely wipe out the national debt.

Skousen was a member of the Meadeau View Institute but resigned citing "irregularities" in management. While at the institute, he mentored Oliver DeMille, and his influence helped shape George Wythe University, a private, unaccredited university in Cedar City, Utah, which grew out of the Meadeau View, at one point used Skousen's books as texts, and closed in 2016.

== Views ==
Power from any source tends to create an appetite for additional power... It was almost inevitable that the super-rich would one day aspire to control not only their own wealth, but the wealth of the whole world....As I see it, the great contribution which Dr. Carroll Quigley unintentionally made[...]was to help the ordinary American people realize the utter contempt which the network leaders have for ordinary people. Human beings are treated en masse as helpless puppets on an international chess board where giants of economic and political power subject them to wars, revolution, civil strife, confiscation, subversion, indoctrination, manipulation and outright deception as it suits their fancy and their concocted schemes for world domination.

— From The Naked Capitalist, Skousen's review
of Carroll Quigley's Tragedy and Hope

Skousen opposed all federal regulatory agencies and argued against the creation of the Occupational Safety and Health Administration and the Environmental Protection Agency. He also wanted to repeal the minimum wage, eliminate unions, nullify anti-discrimination laws, sell off public lands and national parks, end the direct election of senators, eliminate the income tax and the estate tax, remove the walls separating church and state, and end the Federal Reserve System.

Skousen "once called Jamestown's original settlers communists, wrote end-of-days prophecy and suggested Russians stole Sputnik from the United States." In 1987, Skousen was criticized for suggesting in one of his books that "American slave children were freer than white non-slaves." Beginning with his first book, Skousen viewed the U.S. Constitution as a divinely inspired document that was under siege.

Skousen spoke against communism throughout his career. He agreed with John Birch Society co-founder Robert W. Welch Jr.'s contention that President Dwight D. Eisenhower was a communist agent. He did not believe the U.S. should establish diplomatic relations with the People's Republic of China, claiming that the U.S. State Department was engaging in treason with respect to Secretary of State Henry Kissinger's visit to "his old friend Mao Tse-tung."

Skousen claimed that the Rockefeller family and Wall Street had conspired to elect Jimmy Carter president, asserting a cabal of bankers like the Rockefellers and J. P. Morgan were conspiring to create a one-world government. Skousen was also known as a strong supporter of "law and order" and believed that local police departments were being undermined in order to promote a national police state.

He influenced Russell Pearce, Evan Mecham, Richard Mack, and Glenn Beck.

== Writings ==
Skousen authored The Naked Communist and was the source of the "Current Communist Goals" that was read into the Congressional Record in 1963. In 1970, he wrote The Naked Capitalist based on the book Tragedy and Hope by Carroll Quigley, which claimed that top Western merchant bankers, industrialists and related institutions were behind the rise of communism and fascism around the world. Skousen's aim was to summarize the ideas in Quigley's books and thus make them accessible to a wider audience; however, Quigley disavowed Skousen's interpretations of his work. Skousen states in the work that the purpose of liberal internationalist groups such as the Council on Foreign Relations, is to push "U.S. foreign policy toward the establishment of a world-wide collectivist society." Among the sources Skousen cited to substantiate his claims in The Naked Capitalist was a former czarist army officer named Arsene de Goulevitch, whose own sources included Boris Brasol, a White Russian émigré who provided Henry Ford with the first English translation of the fraudulent Protocols of the Elders of Zion, and later became a supporter of Nazi Germany. In 1971, G. Edward Griffin released the documentary The Capitalist Conspiracy: An Inside View of International Banking crediting the film: "We wish to acknowledge that this film was inspired by Cleon Skousen's book, The Naked Capitalist which we believe is one of the most important documents of the decade." The Naked Capitalist has been cited by many, including Cleon Skousen's nephew Joel Skousen, as proof of a "New World Order" strategy to create a One World Government.

In So You Want to Raise a Boy? (1962), Skousen advocates spanking as an appropriate domestic disciplinary resource for parents of boys.

In 1987, controversy erupted in California when the state briefly considered using Skousen's book, The Making of America, as a textbook for California schools. Statements in the book regarding slavery, and its use of the term pickaninny as a label for slave children engendered a heated debate as to whether the book was appropriate. The state commission's Executive Director, a former colleague of Skousen at the National Center for Constitutional Studies, asserted that these statements were "largely taken out of context" from a 1934 essay on slavery by the historian Fred Albert Shannon that Skousen had included in his book. Skousen highlights the global history of slavery as independent of color or race in The Making Of America claiming that "... the emancipation of human beings from slavery is an ongoing struggle. Slavery is not a racial problem. It is a human problem."

Skousen began his research for his book The Five Thousand Year Leap in the 1930s while attending law school, combing archives in the Library of Congress for the original writings of such Founding Fathers as John Adams and Thomas Jefferson and continued to work on the manuscript for the next 50 years, finally publishing it in 1981.

== Contemporary reception ==
While Skousen was alive, many of his ideas were met with fierce criticism, while his pronouncements made him "a pariah among most conservative activists". In one instance, the constitutional scholar Jack Rakove, of Stanford University, inspected Skousen's books and seminars and pronounced them "a joke that no self-respecting scholar would think is worth a warm pitcher of spit." A 1971 review in the Mormon studies journal Dialogue described Skousen as "inventing fantastic ideas and making inferences that go far beyond the bounds of honest commentary," and also of promoting concepts that were "perilously close" to Nazism.

Moreover, in 1979 after Skousen described President Jimmy Carter as beholden to the Council on Foreign Relations and the wealthy and influential Rockefeller family, Spencer W. Kimball, then president of the LDS church, issued an order prohibiting announcements about Skousen's groups from official LDS meetings or publications.

== Legacy ==
By Skousen's 2006 death, he remained fairly obscure except among "furthest-right Mormons." U.S. Senator Orrin Hatch, himself Mormon, who had Skousen and Skousen's Freemen Institute as patrons when Hatch ran for the Senate as an unknown in 1976, eulogized Skousen on the floor of the U.S. Senate, saying:

Shortly before I announced that I would be running for the U.S. Senate in 1976 as a political novice and virtually unknown candidate—Cleon was one of the first people of political significance and substance who agreed to meet with me and discuss my candidacy. A few short years before this time, Cleon had organized a nonprofit educational foundation named "The Freemen Institute," to foster "constitutionalist" principles including a drastic reduction in the size and scope of the Federal Government, and a reverence for the true, unchanging nature of our Constitution. I knew that he had strongly held beliefs and I was very interested in what he had to say. We found in each other at that first meeting many areas of common ground and a shared love for the principles that make America the strongest bastion of freedom on Earth. Cleon quickly agreed to help, and throughout the coming months he became a true champion of my candidacy. [...] As we all know, Cleon was a prolific author and writer. His books The First 2000 Years, The Making of America, and The Five Thousand Year Leap have been used by foundations, and in forums across America for many years. [...] I loved an account I recently read in the Deseret News from the Rev. Donald Sills, a Baptist minister who became close friends over many years with Cleon. He spoke of his knowledge and study and recalled a time when he found Cleon sitting on the steps of the Jefferson Memorial in Washington, DC. When he asked Cleon what he was doing just sitting there, Cleon's fitting response was, "I'm talking to Tom Jefferson."

In September 2007, a year prior to the 2008 United States presidential election, Jan Mickelson of Iowa radio station WHO and Republican Iowa caucus presidential candidate Mitt Romney discussed Skousen in an off-the-air conversation during a break in Mickelson's broadcast, which Mickelson recorded. In the conversation, Mickelson touted Skousen's American Constitutionalism and Romney cited Skousen as an expert on Mormon theology. In commentary about this exchange, the National Review's Mark Hemingway termed Skousen an "...all-around nutjob", and described The Naked Communist as "so irrational in its paranoia that it would have made Whittaker Chambers blush," adding, "to be fair, Skousen wrote on numerous topics with wildly varying degrees of intellectual sobriety. In fact, as the radio host in the YouTube video notes, Skousen's writings on original intent and the U.S. Constitution in The Making of America are compellingly argued, and to this day are often cited by conservatives unaware of Skousen's more checkered writings. Further, Skousen's scriptural commentaries are still very popular and well-regarded within the relatively unradical world of mainstream Mormonism."

In fall of 2007, political commentator Glenn Beck began promoting The 5,000 Year Leap on his show, describing it as "divinely inspired" and written by someone "much more intelligent than myself". Leap argues that the U.S. Constitution is infused with Judeo-Christian virtues as well as Enlightenment philosophy. Skousen's son Paul Skousen asked Beck to write the foreword for a new edition of the book. Texas Governor Rick Perry has also promoted the book.

In a November 2010 article in Canada's National Post, Alexander Zaitchik, author of Common Nonsense (a book critical of Glenn Beck), described Skousen as a "whack job" with "decidedly dubious theories."

After Beck began promoting Skousen's The 5,000 Year Leap in March 2009, it climbed at one point to number one in sales on the Amazon.com non-fiction list and stayed in the top 15 throughout the following summer. In September 2009, the book was being sold at meetings of Beck's 9-12 Project and was often used as source material for 9-12 Project speakers.

Skousen's book on LDS end times prophecy, The Cleansing of America, was published by Valor Publishing Group in 2010.

Former Republican Party candidate for U.S. president Ben Carson's frequent claims that Democratic Party or liberal politicians have communist or fascist beliefs have led commentators to investigate his sources. Carson has "endorsed the work of W. Cleon Skousen, a conspiracy-minded author and supporter of the John Birch Society." "Mr. Carson views Mr. Skousen's work, especially The Naked Communist, as an interpretive key to America today." "He [Carson] recommends W. Cleon Skousen's The Naked Communist, a 1958 book by the former FBI special agent and favorite of the right who lays out the strategy communists would use to take control of the U.S." "There's also a book called The Naked Communist. It was written in 1958 by Cleon Skousen, the same guy who wrote The 5000 Year Leap. It lays out the whole progressive plan for fundamentally changing America. The only thing that's truly amazing is how quickly it's being done." Carson plagiarized Skousen's 5,000 Year Leap, among other works, in his own book America the Beautiful; Carson apologized in January 2015 after the plagiarism came to light.

In an op-ed, Chris Zinda of The Independent (Note: The source cited is separate from the British online newspaper of the same name and based in St. George, Utah.) points out a book co-published by Cliven Bundy, the central figure of a 2014 standoff with the Bureau of Land Management. According to Zinda, it lays out Bundy's motivations behind the standoff, which he describes as "a combination of LDS theology and Skousen constitutional theory".

== Family ==
Skousen's son, Paul Skousen, is an author. Skousen's nephews include: Joel Skousen, a survivalist and political author; Royal Skousen, a Mormon studies scholar and BYU professor of linguistics and English; and Mark Skousen, a libertarian economist and author–commentator who runs FreedomFest.

== Selected works ==
Political writing

- Skousen, W. Cleon (March 19, 2009). James Michael Pratt; Carlos L Packard (eds.). The Five Thousand Year Leap. Franklin, Tennessee: American Documents Publishing, LLC. p. 356. ISBN 978-0-9815596-6-7.
- The Making of America: The Substance and Meaning of the Constitution (2nd ed.). Malta, Idaho: National Center for Constitutional Studies. 1985. pp. 888. ISBN 0-88080-017-8.
- The Miracle of America (Paperback ed.). National Center for Constitutional Studies. 1977. ASIN B000J5A9XY
- The Naked Communist (11th ed.). Salt Lake City, Utah: Ensign. 1962. p. 408. ASIN B000NKE3M
- The Naked Capitalist. self-published. 1962. ASIN B000GDX9D6
- The Majesty of God's Law.

Religious

- Richard Skousen (2007). Brother Joseph: Seer of New Dispensation (Volume 1). Pleasant Grove, Utah: Verity Publishing. ISBN 978-0-934364-27-0.
- Treasures from The Book of Mormon Volume 1 (First Nephi-jacob 7) (Paperback ed.). Salt Lake City, Utah: Ensign Publishing. 1998. p. 329. ASIN B000Q8120S
- A Personal Search for the Meaning of the Atonement (Audio cassette ed.). Ensign Productions. ASIN B000QXLQYA
- So You Want To Raise A Boy? (1994 ed.). Salt Lake City, Utah: Ensign. 1958. p. 346. ISBN 978-0-934364-15-7.
- Isaiah Speaks to Modern Times. Salt Lake City, Utah: Ensign. 1984. ISBN 978-0-910558-25-9.
- The First Two Thousand Years. Salt Lake City, Utah: Bookcraft. 1953. ISBN 0-88494-029-2.
- The Third Thousand Years. Salt Lake City, Utah: Bookcraft. 1964. ISBN 0-88494-122-1.
- The Fourth Thousand Years: From David to Christ. Salt Lake City, Utah: Bookcraft. 1966. ISBN 0-88494-147-7.
- Days of the Living Christ, Vol. 1. Salt Lake City, Utah: Ensign Publishing Co. 1992. ISBN 0-916095-46-0.
- Days of the Living Christ, Vol. 2. Salt Lake City, Utah: Ensign Publishing Co. 1998. ISBN 0-916095-47-9.
- The Real Story of Christmas; and Authoritative Historical Sources Compiled from The Scriptures. Salt Lake City, Utah: Deseret Book Co. 1958. ASIN B000WLY4UY
- Prophecy and Modern Times. Salt Lake City, Utah: Deseret Books. 1948. p. 150. ASIN B0007EXO02
- The Cleansing of America. Orem, Utah: Valor Publishing Group. 2010. p. 180. ISBN 978-1-935546-21-4.

Discography

- Building Balanced Children, Key Records KEY LP-770, 1961.
- Instant Insanity Drugs, Key Records KLP-1101, 1968.
- The Ten Commandments: A Timely Commentary by W. Cleon Skousen, Key Records KLP-2670.

== See also ==
- Originalism
- Red-baiting
- Sovereign citizen movement
- Bundy standoff
- Occupation of the Malheur National Wildlife Refuge
