= Oliver DeMille =

American author (born 1968)

- Born: c. 1968; Hurricane, Utah
- Known for: Author of A Thomas Jefferson Education, co-author (with Orrin Woodward) of LeaderShift
- Spouse: Rachel (Pinegar) DeMille
- Children: 8
- Website: https://tjed.org/

Oliver DeMille is an American author, educator and public speaker. He is the founder of an educational model known as TJEd, and the co-author of LeaderShift: A Call for Americans to Finally Stand Up and Lead, which was published in 2013 and appeared on the New York Times and Wall Street Journal bestseller lists.

== Works ==
DeMille promotes an educational paradigm known as Thomas Jefferson Education (also known as Leadership Education or "TJEd", pronounced "tee-jay-Ed"). Most of his works, whether philosophical, political or educational, promote his view that the state of modern education is not favorable for reliably producing principled leaders of the caliber of Thomas Jefferson, while also conveying an overview of his philosophies and prescriptions for how individuals can provide themselves with a quality self-education and/or select an institution that will deliver an excellent learning experience. He asserts that a classical, mentored education empowers the individual to successfully meet the challenges of the time — whether as an educator, an entrepreneur, a community leader or a parent.

His works include:

- LeaderShift: A Call for Americans to Finally Stand Up and Lead (2013, with Orrin Woodward; published by Business Plus. This title was included on the bestseller lists of major periodicals including New York Times, Wall Street Journal, and Publishers Weekly
- A Thomas Jefferson Education: Teaching a Generation of Leaders for the Twenty-first Century (1st edition, softbound, 2000; 4th edition 2013; published by TJEd.org)
- The Phases of Learning (2008, with Rachel DeMille; published by TJEd.org)
- 1913 (2012, published by Obstaclés Press)
- We Hold These Truths to be Self-Evident (2013, published by Obstaclés Press)
