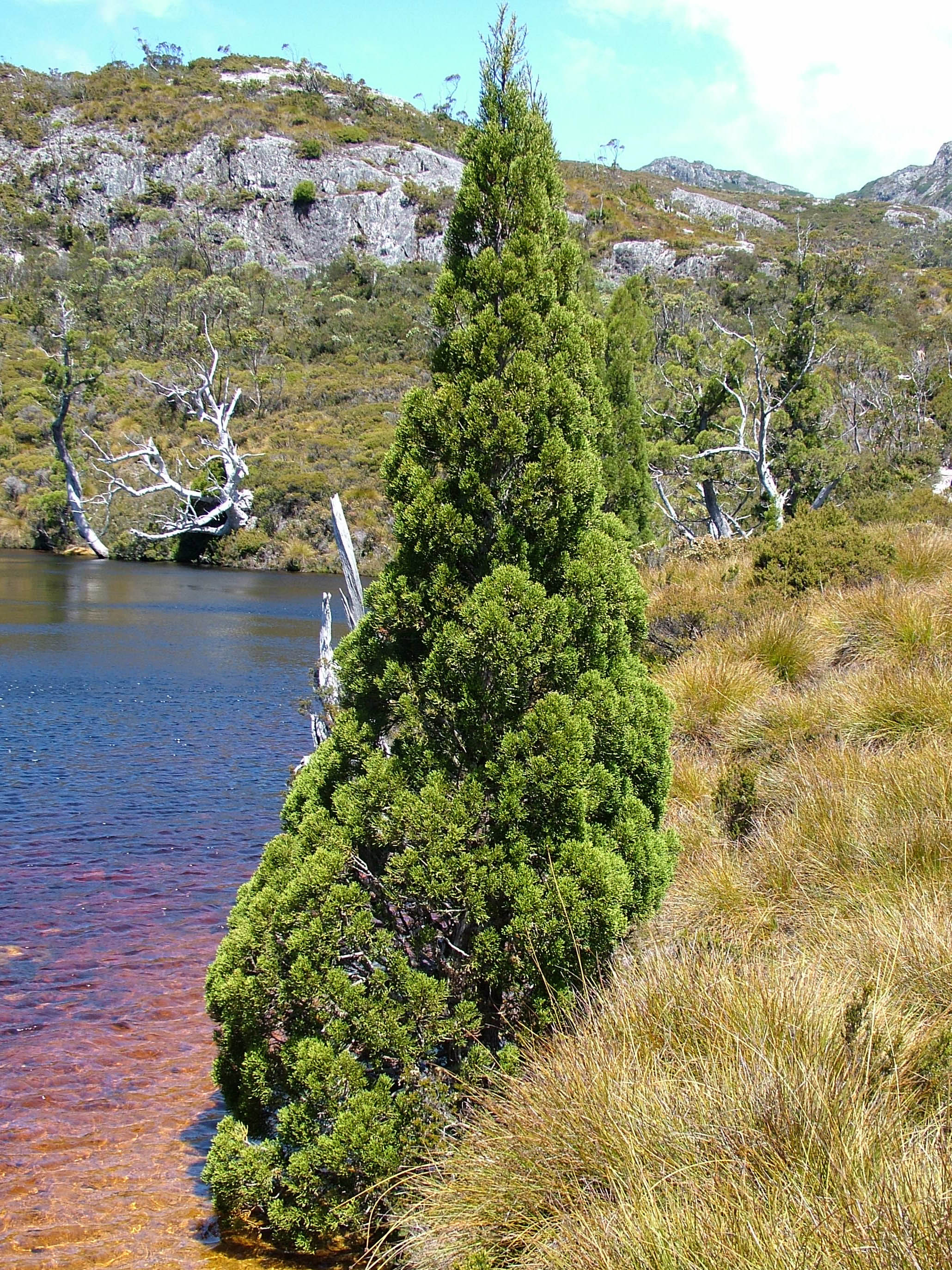

Conservation status
- Vulnerable (IUCN 3.1)

Scientific classification
- Kingdom: Plantae
- Clade: Embryophytes
- Clade: Tracheophytes
- Clade: Gymnosperms
- Division: Pinophyta
- Class: Pinopsida
- Order: Cupressales
- Family: Cupressaceae
- Genus: Athrotaxis
- Species: A. cupressoides

Binomial name
- Athrotaxis cupressoides D.Don

= Athrotaxis cupressoides =

Species of conifer

Athrotaxis cupressoides, commonly known as pencil pine, is a species of conifer in the cypress family,Cupressaceae and not a member of the pine family. Found either as an erect shrub or as a tree, this species is endemic to Tasmania, Australia. Trees can live for upwards of 1000 years, sustaining a very slow growth rate of approximately 12 mm in diameter per year.

== Description ==
As with all species in the Athrotaxis genus, A. cupressoides leaves are single-veined and arranged in spirals. Unique to A. cupressoides, the leaves are 2-3mm long/wide with overlapping and closely compressed stems. This results in a scale like appearance. Two forms of woody cones act as the gametophyte structures, which mature approximately six months after pollination and are typically retained on the tree for up to one year. The female cones are spherical with pointed bract scales 12–15 mm in diameter. The male cones are much smaller 3–5 mm in diameter. The common name pencil pine is based on it being an evergreen conical-shaped tree which grows up to 20 m, with trunks up to 1.5 m in diameter. This shape is most prominent when found in subalpine or open alpine vegetation; however, it can also occur as a rainforest tree. Bark is light brown and fibrous, becoming more furrowed with age. The tree produces "root suckers" as much as 50 metres from the trunk, suggesting a very extensive root system.

The name Athrotaxis is derived from the Greek words athros meaning 'crowded' and taxis meaning 'arrangement'. The species name cupressoides in Greek means 'resembling cypress'.

== Distribution and habitat ==
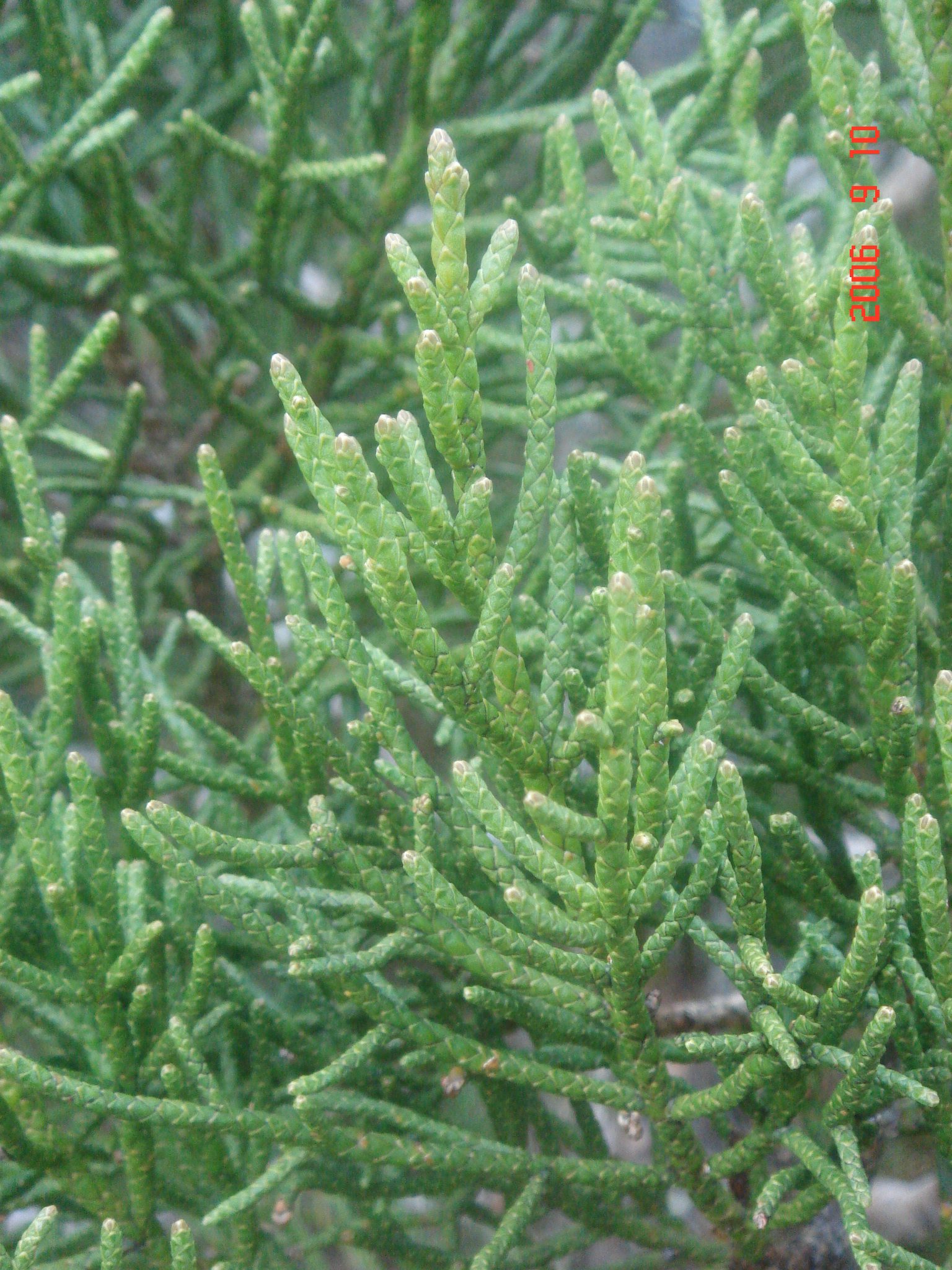
The spiral leaf arrangement

Athrotaxis cupressoides is an endemic native to Tasmania, Australia. Its distribution is primarily in the central and western mountain areas between 700 and 1300 m above sea level, often around tarns or damp depressions on peaty or wet rocky soils. Locations include: the Central Plateau, the Great Western Tier, Mt. Field National Park, the westward mountains such as Cradle Mountain and scattered through the south of the island.

Typically Athrotaxis cupressoides are found in subalpine or open alpine vegetation. When found in montane rainforests (also known as cool temperate rainforests) A. cupressoides dominates. These environments are typically composed of a canopy containing A. cupressoides, and A. selaginoides (King Billy pine), an understory containing Nothofagus cunninghamii (myrtle beech) and Phyllocladus aspleniifolius (celery-top pine), a shrub layer containing Olearia pinifolius (prickly daisybush) and Richea species, and a ground covering of Astelia alpina (pineapple grass), Empodisma minus (spreading rope rush) and Gleichenia alpina (alpine coral fern).

In regions where both A. cupressoides and A. selaginoides grow a third hybrid species can occasionally be found. These two species are so closely related that they form the hybrid Athrotaxis x laxifolia.

== Threats ==
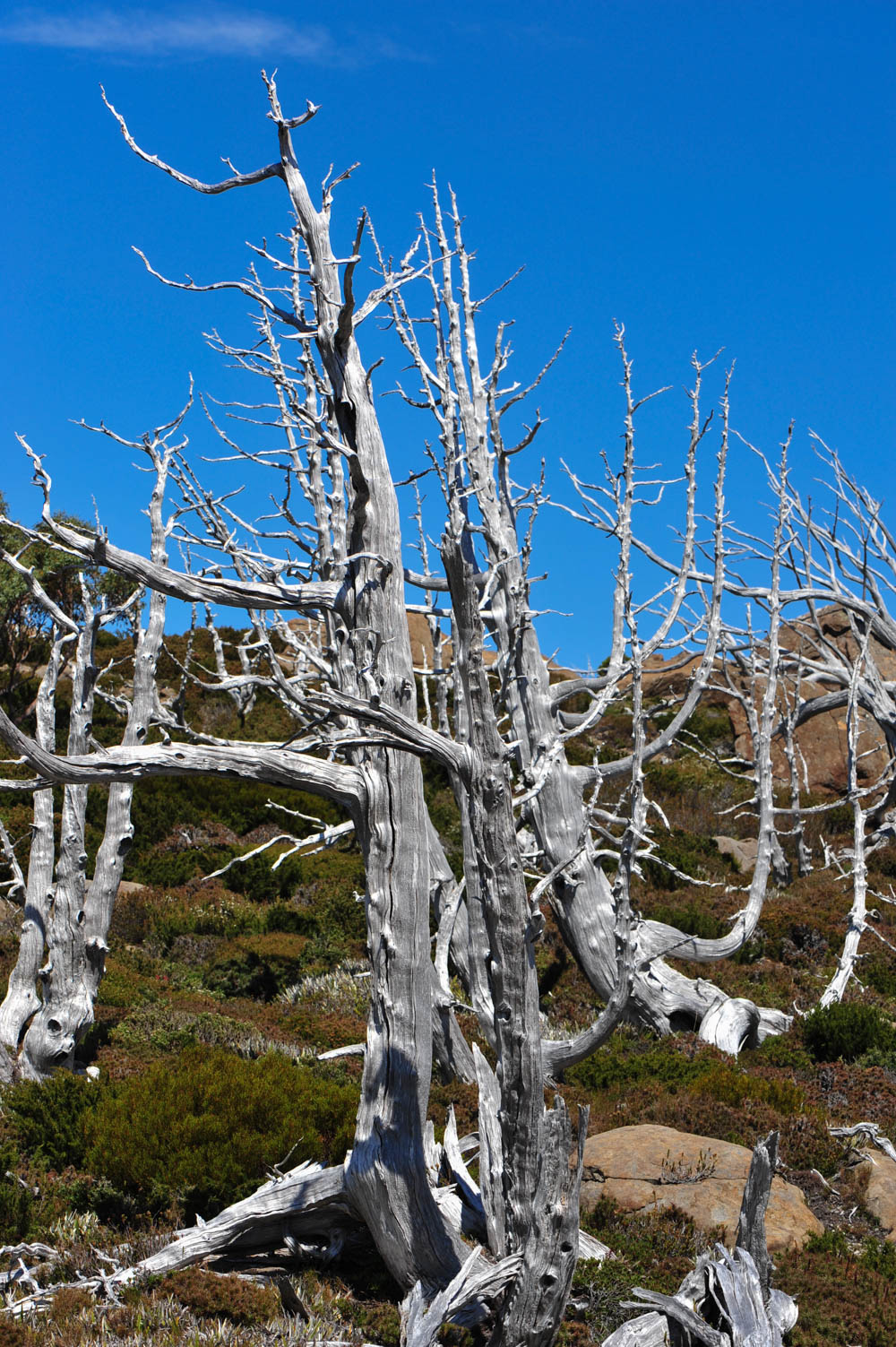
Dead trunks and branches of Athrotaxis cupressoides 30–40 years after a bush fire

Athrotaxis cupressoides is a highly fire sensitive species, hence the oldest and most vigorous populations are located in damp regions. Major fires at the Walls of Jerusalem National Park and the Central Plateau Conservation Area during the summer of 1960–1961, and again in 2016, severely affected and reduced the population. The species' poor adaption to fire and the added stress of regeneration being hampered by grazing animals makes recovery from these incidents difficult. Animals such as sheep, rabbits and native marsupials, have been observed to eat the seedlings, suckers and adult foliage leaving significant impact on the plants. Loss of A. cupressoides populations is largely irreversible given the relatively high fuel loads of postfire vegetation communities that are dominated by resprouting shrubs. A. cupressoides is expected to contract to only the most fire-proof landscapes, given the regeneration failures and increased flammability together with an expected drier and warmer climate.

Signs of dieback have also been associated with disease caused by an introduced strain of Phytophthora.

== Taxonomy ==
Athrotaxis cupressoides was previously under the family Taxodiaceae, which has now been merged with Cupressaceae.

== Uses and cultivation ==
Athrotaxis cupressoides currently has no recorded uses. The trunks are gnarled and unsuitable for uses as timber. The species is, however, occasionally grown and sold as an ornamental.
