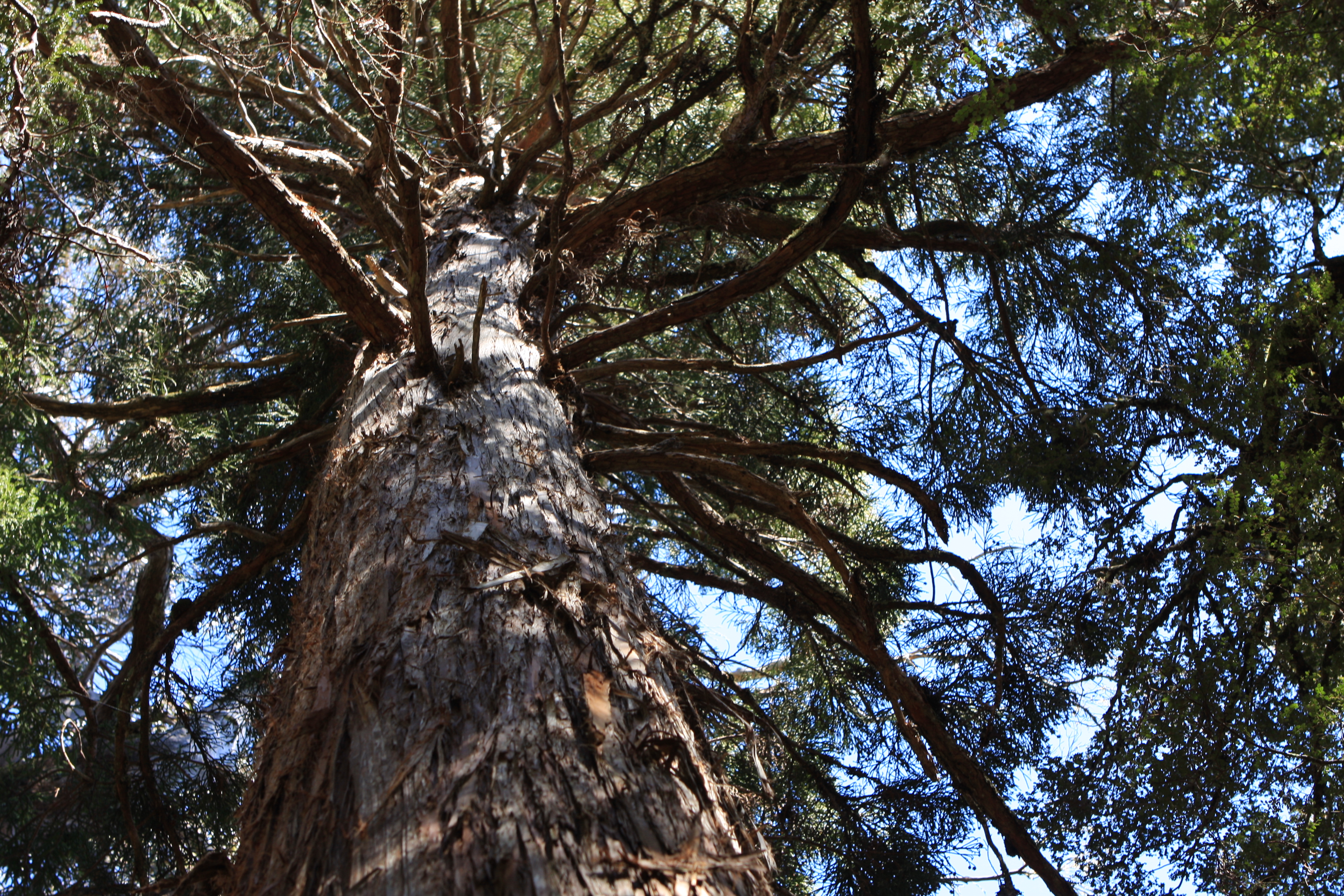

Conservation status
- Endangered (IUCN 3.1)

Scientific classification
- Kingdom: Plantae
- Clade: Tracheophytes
- Clade: Gymnospermae
- Division: Pinophyta
- Class: Pinopsida
- Order: Cupressales
- Family: Cupressaceae
- Genus: Athrotaxis
- Species: A. laxifolia

Binomial name
- Athrotaxis laxifolia Hook.

= Athrotaxis laxifolia =

Species of conifer

Athrotaxis x laxifolia is a tree belonging to the genus Athrotaxis endemic to Tasmania. It is a hybrid between Athrotaxis cupressoides and Athrotaxis selaginoides.

== Description ==
Athrotaxis x laxifolia is an evergreen coniferous tree growing to 12–21 m tall with a sparsely branched crown, an irregular growth habit and a trunk up to 1m diameter. The leaves are scale-like, 4–12 mm long and 2–3 mm broad, arranged spirally on the shoots. The seed cones are oblong-globose, 15–26 mm long and 14–20 mm diameter, with 14–18 spirally-arranged scales; they are mature about six months after pollination. The pollen cones are 3–5 mm long. The bark of A. laxifolia is dark orange-brown, deeply fissured and flaky. The species name laxifolia refers to the wider spacing of the leaves as compared with the other conifers in its genus, Athrotaxis cuppressoides and Athrotaxis selaginoides.

== Habitat and distribution ==
Athrotaxis x laxifolia is endemic to Tasmania, Australia, where it grows between 1,000–1,200 m altitude, in sub-alpine and alpine woodland. One group of researchers have located nine different geographic locations for this species (5 hybrid populations and 4 single individuals). The hybrid populations were found at Mount Reid, Tyndall Range, Crooked Lake, Brumbys Creek, and Tarn Shelf, while the individuals are located at Mount Kate, Pine Lake, Wylds Craig and Lake Dobson Road.

Away from its native range, it is occasionally cultivated as an ornamental tree in northwestern Europe. Despite being the rarest of the three in the wild, it is the most frequently planted Athrotaxis in cultivation, though still only seen in major collections; trees in Ireland have reached 20 m tall.

== Threats and conservation ==
Its status in the wild is little-known; it is the rarest of the three species of Athrotaxis. It is in many respects intermediate between Athrotaxis cupressoides and Athrotaxis selaginoides, and it is strongly suspected of being a natural hybrid between these two. Research has supported the theory of natural hybridization, as populations of A. laxifolia have been genetically studied which revealed that many individuals across the range of this taxon are genetically consistent with being first generation hybrids, although two well-established populations are advanced generation hybrids between A. cupressoides and A. selaginoides. This genetic evidence indicates that these latter two populations are slowly disappearing through the process of repeated hybridisation with Athrotaxis selaginoides. Although listed as Endangered in the IUCN Red List of Threatened Species, the same research has suggested that this classification is unwarranted. Even though A. laxifolia is rare in itself, given the multiple spontaneous hybridization events, it should be afforded the same status as its parent species (A. cuppresoides and A. selaginoides) which is Vulnerable.
