= Cunninghamites elegans =

Scientific classification
- Kingdom: Plantae
- Clade: Tracheophytes
- Clade: Gymnospermae
- Division: Pinophyta
- Class: Pinopsida
- Order: Cupressales
- Family: Cupressaceae
- Genus: †Cunninghamites
- Species: †C. elegans

Binomial name
- †Cunninghamites elegans (Corda) Endlicher, 1847

Synonyms
- Cunninghamia elegans Corda, 1846

Extinct species of conifer

Cunninghamites elegans is an extinct conifer species in the family Cupressaceae and the genus Cunninghamites.

Cunninghamites is a genus of the European Late Cretaceous flora.

Remains of C. elegans needles have been found in the carcasses of the dinosaur Edmontosaurus.
