= Taxodiaceae =

Defunct family of plants

Taxodiaceae is a formerly recognized conifer family. It is today recognised as a paraphyletic grade of basal lineages within the Cupressaceae, with the exception of Sciadopitys verticillata, which has been reclassified into its own family, the Sciadopityaceae.

The Taxodiaceae contains the following living genera:

- Athrotaxis
- Cryptomeria
- Cunninghamia
- Glyptostrobus
- Metasequoia
- Sequoia
- Sequoiadendron
- Taiwania
- Taxodium

As proposed, genera of the former Taxodiaceae are grouped in the following subfamilies within the larger Cupressaceae:

- Athrotaxidoideae Quinn (Athrotaxis)
- Cunninghamioideae (Sieb. & Zucc.) Quinn (Cunninghamia)
- Sequoioideae (Luerss.) Quinn (Sequoia, Sequoiadendron, and Metasequoia)
- Taiwanioideae (Hayata) Quinn (Taiwania)
- Taxodioideae Endl. ex K. Koch (Taxodium, Glyptostrobus, and Cryptomeria)

== Evolution ==
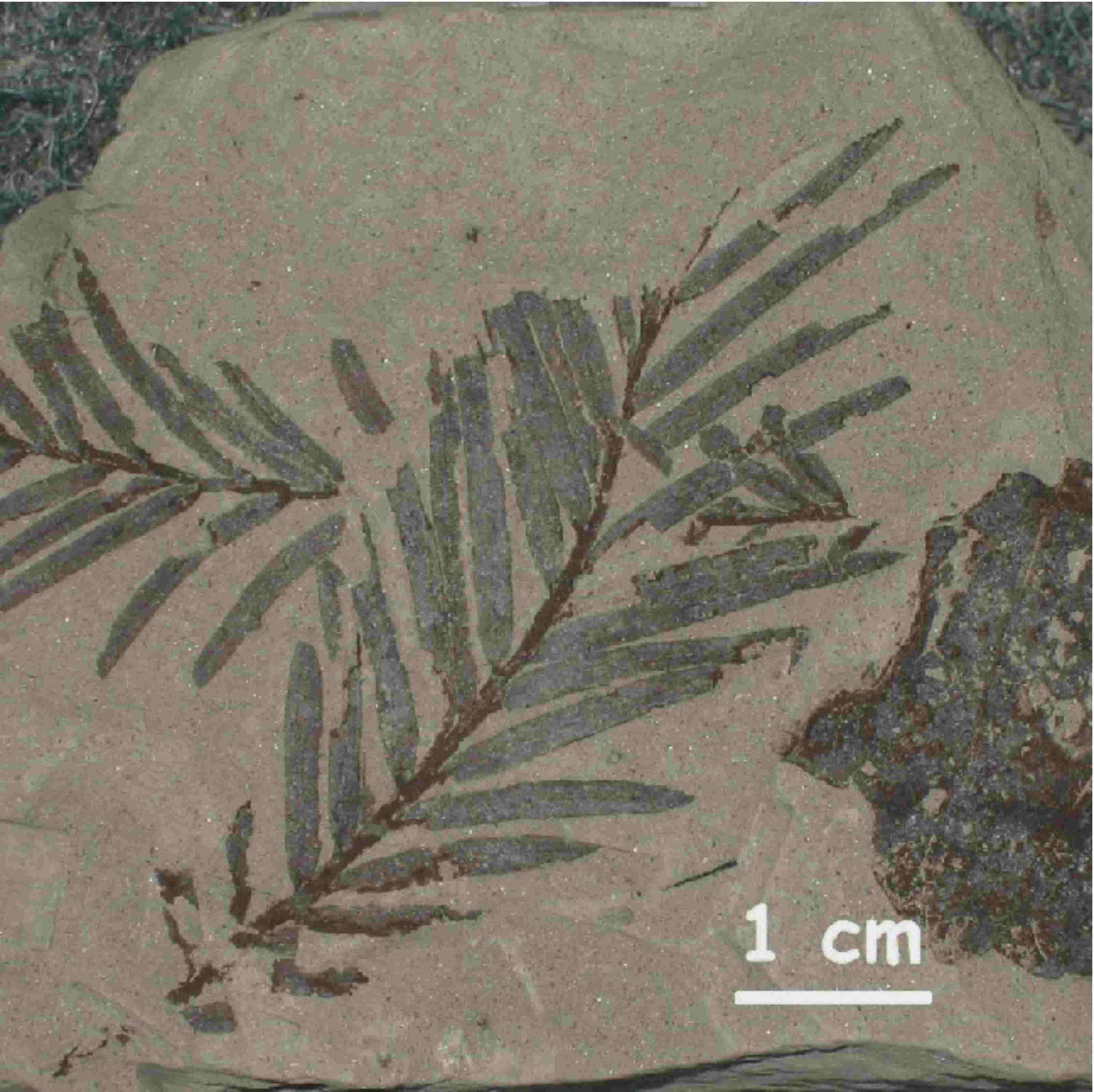
Fossil leave of Taxodium dubium, 8 Mio. years old, Hambach lignite open cast mine, Germany

In earth's history Taxodiaceae were widespread. They are known since the Jurassic and can be found as fossil from Tertiary times.

== Systematics ==
The Taxodiaceae were circumscribed as one of seven conifer families by Robert Pilger in 1926.

In 1976, James Eckenwalder proposed that the Cupressaceae be merged with the Taxodiaceae, a circumscription which has since become consensus.

Prior to Eckenwalder's merger of the Taxodiaceae and the Cupressaceae, the generally accepted scheme was Pilger's, which split the then-pinaceae into seven families: the Taxaceae, Podocarpaceae, Araucariaceae, Cephalotaxaceae, Pinaceae sensu strictu, Taxodiaceae, and Cupressaceae.

Prior taxonomists had historically also suggested combining the Taxodiaceae and Cupressaceae on the basis of such factors as their gametophytes and embryology, or had otherwise grouped the conifers in unusual ways, but these studies were largely ignored due to questionable methodologies and insufficient evidence. Eckenwalder, however, by gathering vast amounts of morphological data (pertaining to embryology, morphology, anatomy, and chemistry), and computing composite “similarity values” aggregating all of these traits, made a newly convincing case that the Taxodiaceae and Cupressaceae were as similar to each other as groups classed in the same families elsewhere.

Recent papers concur with Eckenwalder, offering supporting genetic evidence, including from the DNA sequencing of rbcL plastids, and ultimately finding that, together, the Cupressaceae sensu strictu and the Taxodiaceae, with the removal of Sciadopitys verticillata, form a monophyletic group.

== See also ==
- Taxodioideae
- Cupressaceae
