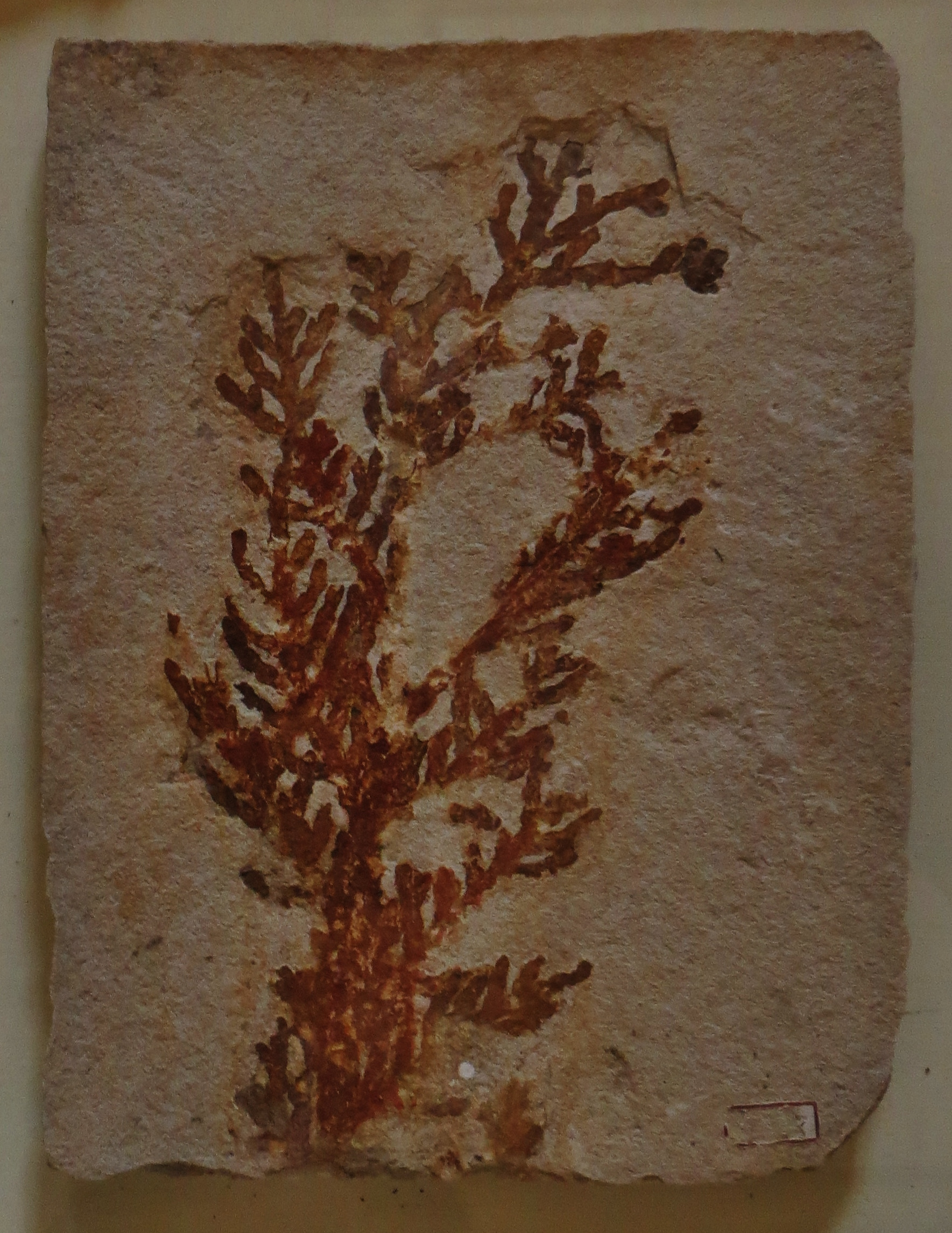

Scientific classification
- Kingdom: Plantae
- Clade: Embryophytes
- Clade: Tracheophytes
- Clade: Gymnosperms
- Division: Pinophyta
- Class: Pinopsida
- Order: Cupressales
- Family: Cupressaceae
- Subfamily: Athrotaxidoideae
- Genus: †Athrotaxites; Unger 1849

= Athrotaxites =

Athrotaxites Temporal range: Middle Jurassic to Late Cretaceous (Callovian-Turonian), 165.3–89.8 Ma

Extinct genus of plants

Athrotaxites is an extinct genus of conifers belonging to the family Cupressaceae, known primarily from fossil material dating to the Jurassic and Cretaceous periods. It is closely related to the extant Tasmanian genus Athrotaxis, and is typically classified within the subfamily Athrotaxoideae.

== Description ==
Athrotaxites is characterized by distinctive reproductive structures, particularly ovuliferous cones bearing multiple winged seeds, and leafy twigs with helically arranged scale-like leaves.

== Distribution ==
Fossils attributed to Athrotaxites have been recovered from a range of geographically and geologically diverse sites, indicating that the genus once had a broad distribution across the Northern Hemisphere during the Cretaceous period. In North America, well-preserved remains of Athrotaxites berryi have been described from the Aptian-aged Kootenai Formation in Montana and the Lower Blairmore Formation in Alberta, Canada, representing some of the earliest records of the genus on the continent. Additional fossil material, including ovuliferous complexes assigned to another Athrotaxites species, has been found in the Upper Cretaceous Raritan Formation of New Jersey, USA. In Asia, Athrotaxites yumenensis was discovered in the Lower Cretaceous Zhonggou Formation in northwestern China, where it occurs abundantly in certain sedimentary layers. Jurassic aged fossils been found in India, Germany, Madagascar and Argentina. A Jurassic aged fossil is known from the Morrison Formation in Montana.

== Ecology ==
Based on both fossil morphology and depositional context, it is suspected that Athrotaxites occupied cooler temperate environments with high moisture levels. The adaptation for cooler temperatures can also be seen in its modern relative, Athrotaxis.
