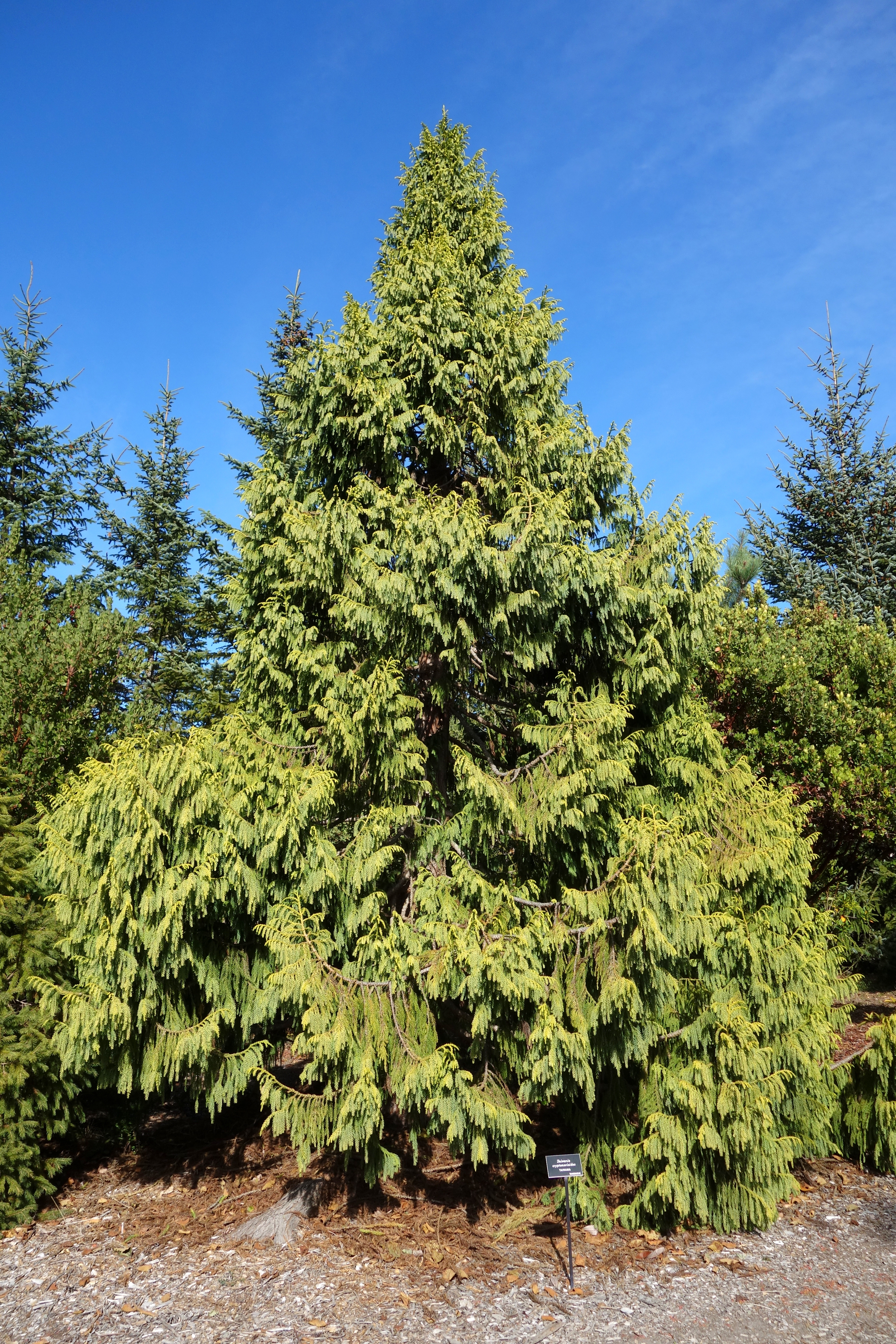

Conservation status
- Vulnerable (IUCN 3.1)

Scientific classification
- Kingdom: Plantae
- Clade: Tracheophytes
- Clade: Gymnosperms
- Division: Pinophyta
- Class: Pinopsida
- Order: Cupressales
- Family: Cupressaceae
- Subfamily: Taiwanioideae
- Genus: Taiwania; Hayata
- Species: T. cryptomerioides

Binomial name
- Taiwania cryptomerioides Hayata

Synonyms
- Eotaiwania Y.Yendo; Taiwania flousiana Gaussen; Taiwania yunnanensis Koidz.; Taiwania cryptomerioides var. flousiana (Gaussen) Silba; Taiwanites Hayata

= Taiwania =

Taiwania Temporal range: Albian–Recent

Genus of conifers

Taiwania, with the single living species Taiwania cryptomerioides, is a large coniferous tree in the cypress family, Cupressaceae.

== Description ==
It is one of the largest tree species in Asia, reported to heights of up to 90 m (300 ft) tall and with a trunk up to 4 m (13 ft) diameter above buttressed base. The leaves are needle-like or awl-like and 8–15 mm (0.31–0.59 in) long on young trees up to about 100 years old, then gradually becoming more scale-like, 3–7 mm (0.12–0.28 in) long, on mature trees. The cones are small, 15–25 mm (0.59–0.98 in) long, with about 15–30 thin, fragile scales, each scale with two seeds.

== Taxonomy ==
The genus was formerly placed in the segregate family Taxodiaceae, it is now included in the monotypic subfamily Taiwanioideae of the family Cupressaceae. It is the second most basal member of the living Cupressaceae, with only Cunninghamia being more basal. Its lineage is thought to have diverged from the rest of Cupressaceae during the Middle Jurassic. The oldest fossil assignable to the genus is from the mid-Cretaceous (Albian-Cenomanian) of Alaska. Other fossils of the genus are known from the Late Cretaceous of Asia, the Eocene of Asia and North America, and the Miocene of Europe and Asia.

=== Etymology ===
Taiwania means 'from Taiwan', while cryptomerioides means 'resembling Cryptomeria.

== Distribution and habitat ==
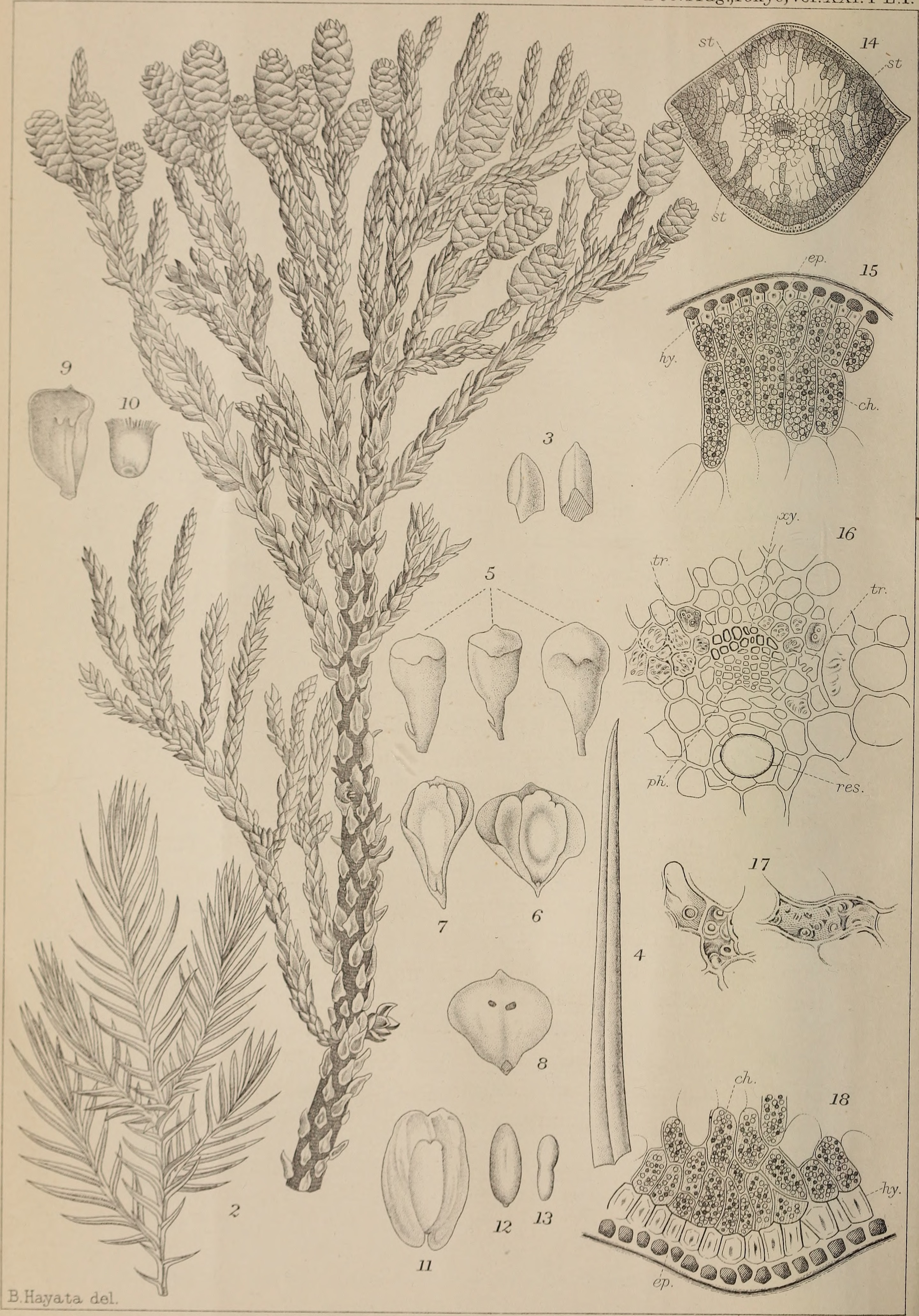
Taiwania cryptomerioides in the botanical magazine Shokubutsugaku zasshi (1907)

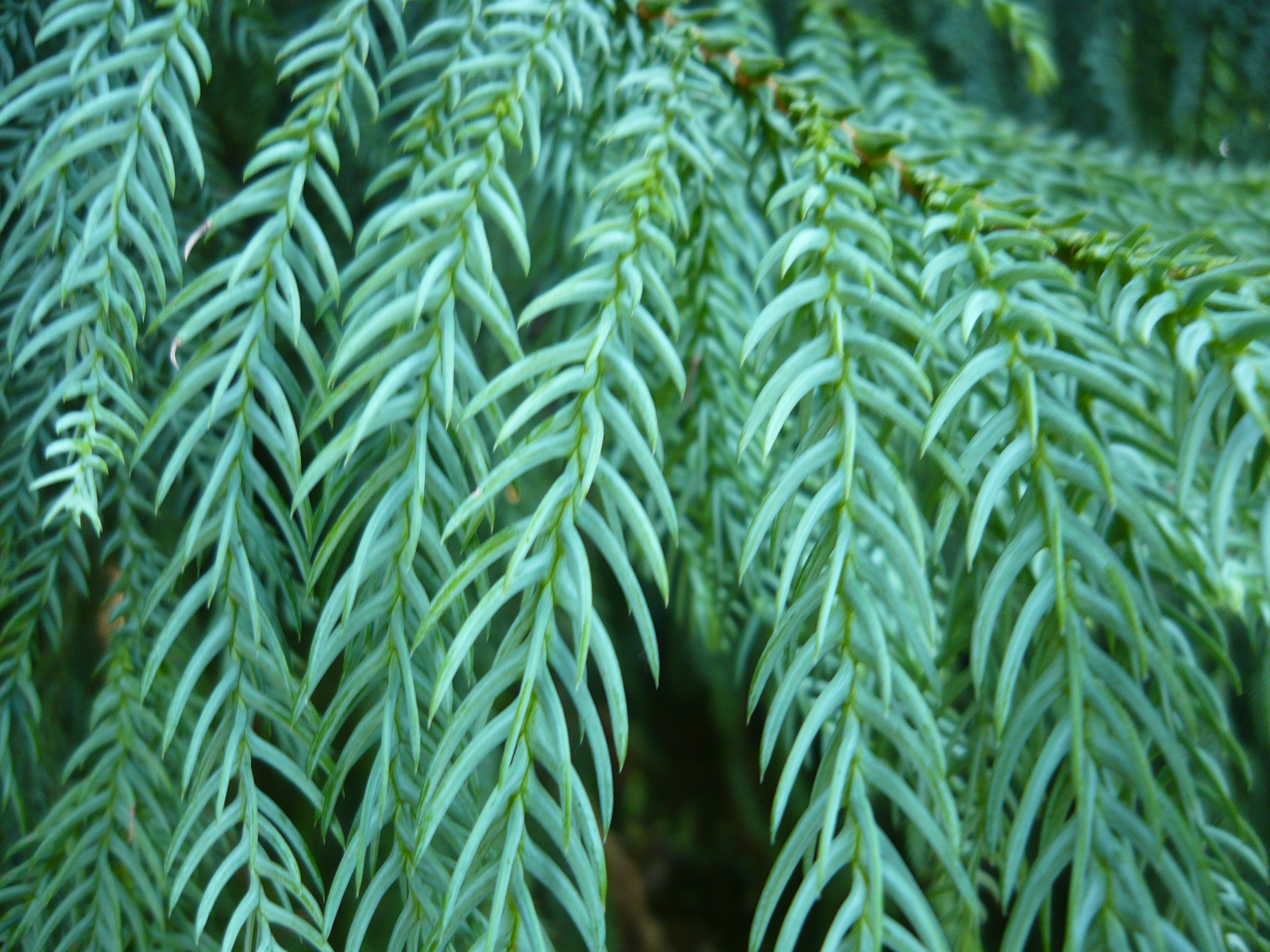
Taiwania cryptomerioides' needle-like leaves

It is native to eastern Asia, growing in the mountains of central Taiwan, and locally in southwest China (Guizhou, Hubei, Sichuan, Yunnan, Tibet) and adjoining Myanmar, and northern Vietnam.

== Conservation ==
It is endangered by illegal logging for its valuable wood in many areas. It is very likely that the range was more extensive in the past before extensive felling for the wood. The populations in mainland Asia were treated as a distinct species Taiwania flousiana by some botanists, but the cited differences between these and the Taiwanese population are not consistent when a number of specimens from each area are compared.

== Uses ==
The wood is soft, but durable and attractively spicy scented, and was in very high demand in the past, particularly for temple building and coffins. The rarity of the tree and its slow growth in plantations means legal supplies are now very scarce; the species has legal protection in China and Taiwan.

== Extraordinary specimens ==
In 2022 a team of researchers measured a 79.1 meters (259.5 feet) Taiwania specimen in Shei-pa National Park. The tree was growing at an elevation of 2,000m. In 2023 a specimen was found measuring 84.1 meters (276 ft) in height. Referred to as the "Heavenly Sword of the Da'an River", it is the tallest tree in Taiwan.

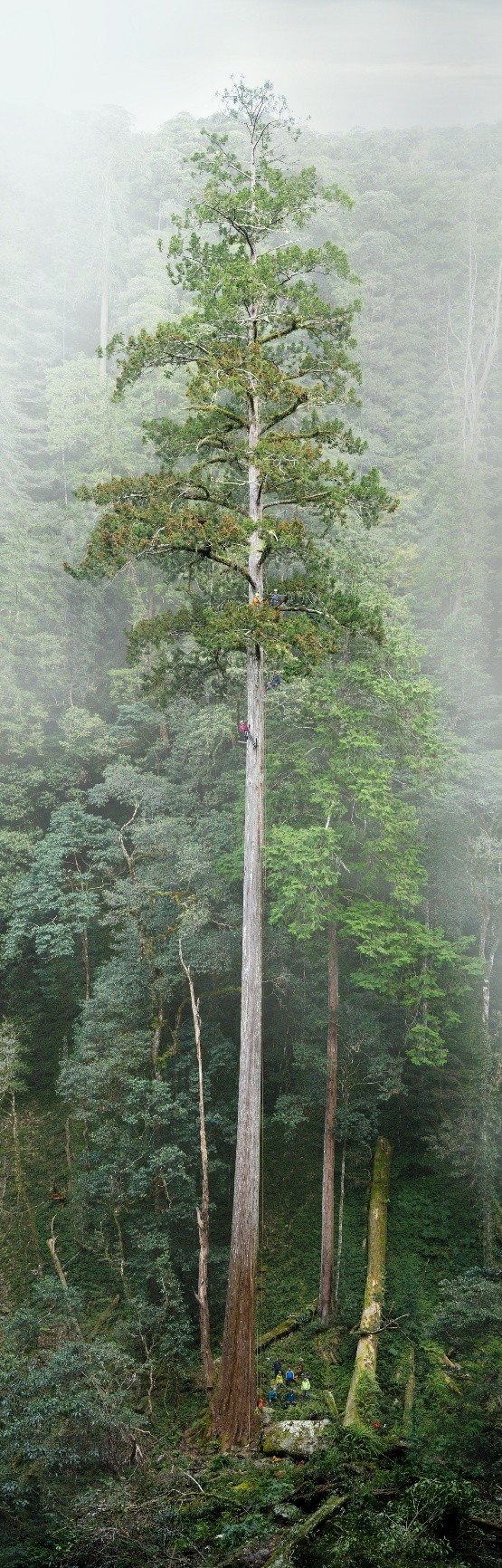
The Heavenly Sword of the Da'an River is the tallest known Taiwania specimen.

== See also ==
- Taiwania (supercomputer)
- Taiwanica
