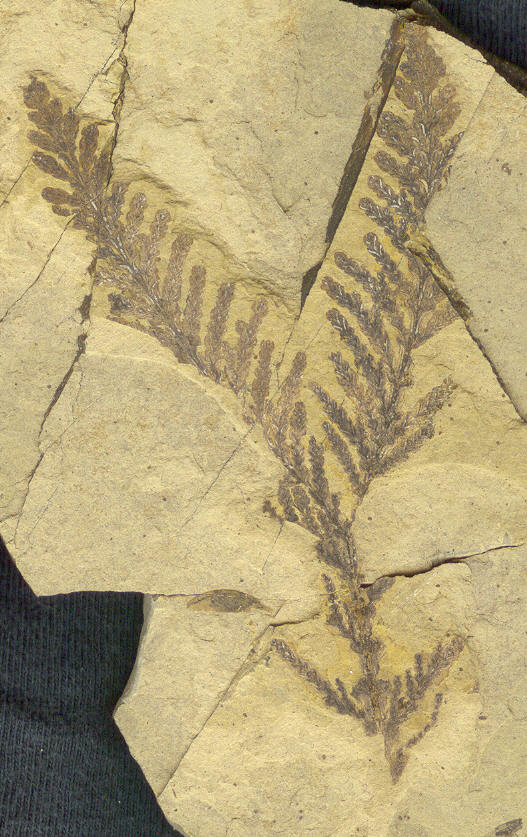
- Mesocyparis species

Scientific classification
- Kingdom: Plantae
- Clade: Tracheophytes
- Clade: Gymnosperms
- Division: Pinophyta
- Class: Pinopsida
- Order: Cupressales
- Family: Cupressaceae
- Genus: †Mesocyparis; McIver & Basinger, 1987

Species
- †Mesocyparis borealis †Mesocyparis rosanovii †Mesocyparis umbonata

= Mesocyparis =

Mesocyparis Temporal range: Cretaceous–Paleogene

Extinct genus of conifers

Mesocyparis is an extinct genus of conifers of uncertain placement within the cypress family, Cupressaceae.
