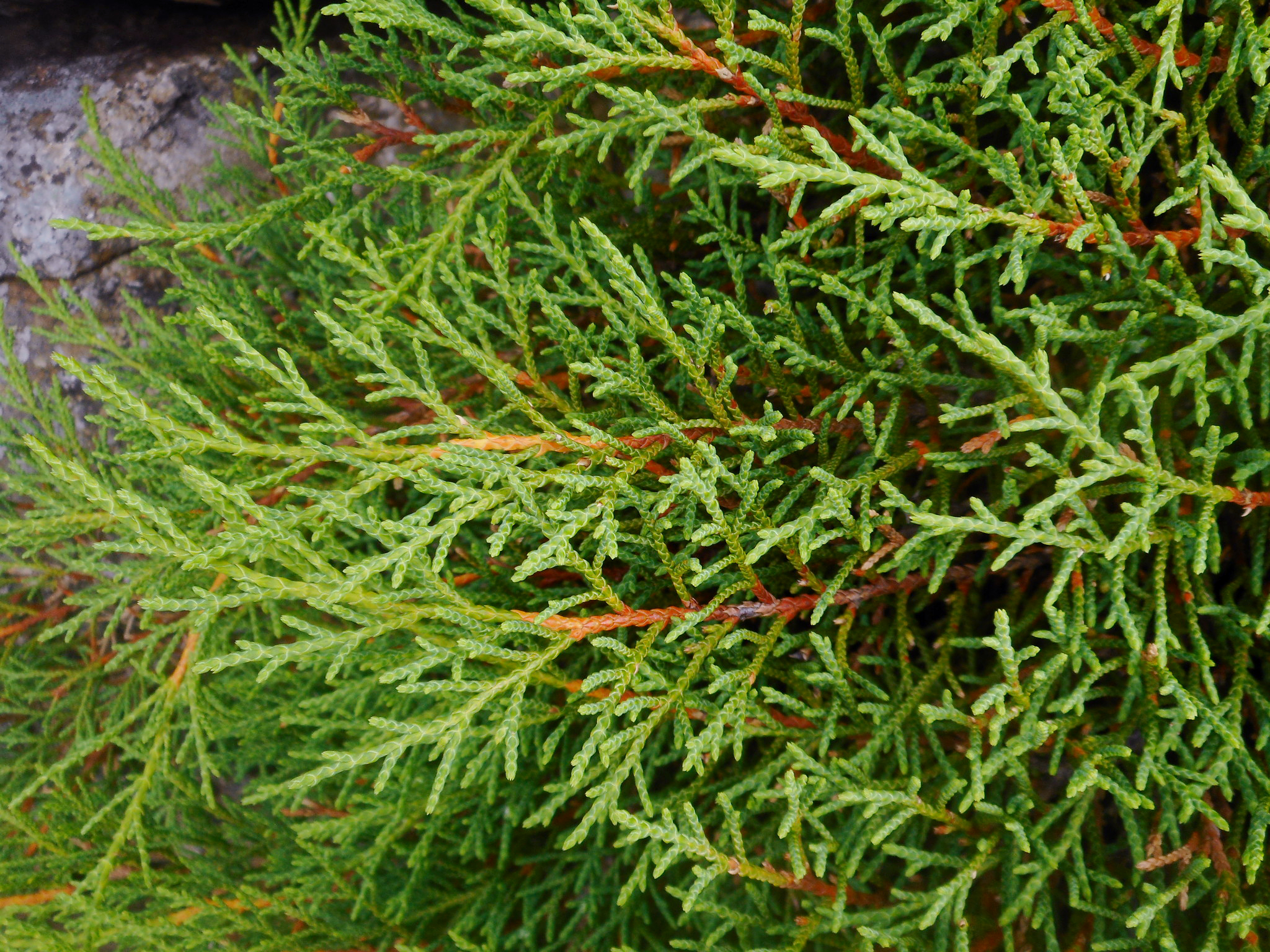
- Microbiota decussata in Shkotovsky District, Primorsky Krai, Russia

Conservation status
- Least Concern (IUCN 3.1)

Scientific classification
- Kingdom: Plantae
- Clade: Tracheophytes
- Clade: Gymnosperms
- Division: Pinophyta
- Class: Pinopsida
- Order: Cupressales
- Family: Cupressaceae
- Subfamily: Cupressoideae
- Genus: Microbiota; Kom.
- Species: M. decussata

Binomial name
- Microbiota decussata Kom.
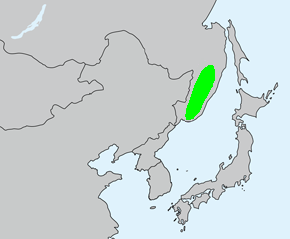

= Microbiota decussata =

Species of plant

Microbiota is a monotypic genus of coniferous shrubs in the cypress family, Cupressaceae, containing only one species, Microbiota decussata, the Siberian cypress, or Russian arborvitae. It is endemic to a limited area of the Sikhote-Alin mountains in Primorskiy Krai in the Russian Far East. The genus name Microbiota is not to be confused with the term "microbiota" for the range of micro-organisms of a life system. The genus name is derived from micro-, meaning "small", + Biota, a synonym of the genus Platycladus, a closely related conifer genus with the sole species Platycladus orientalis.

== Description ==
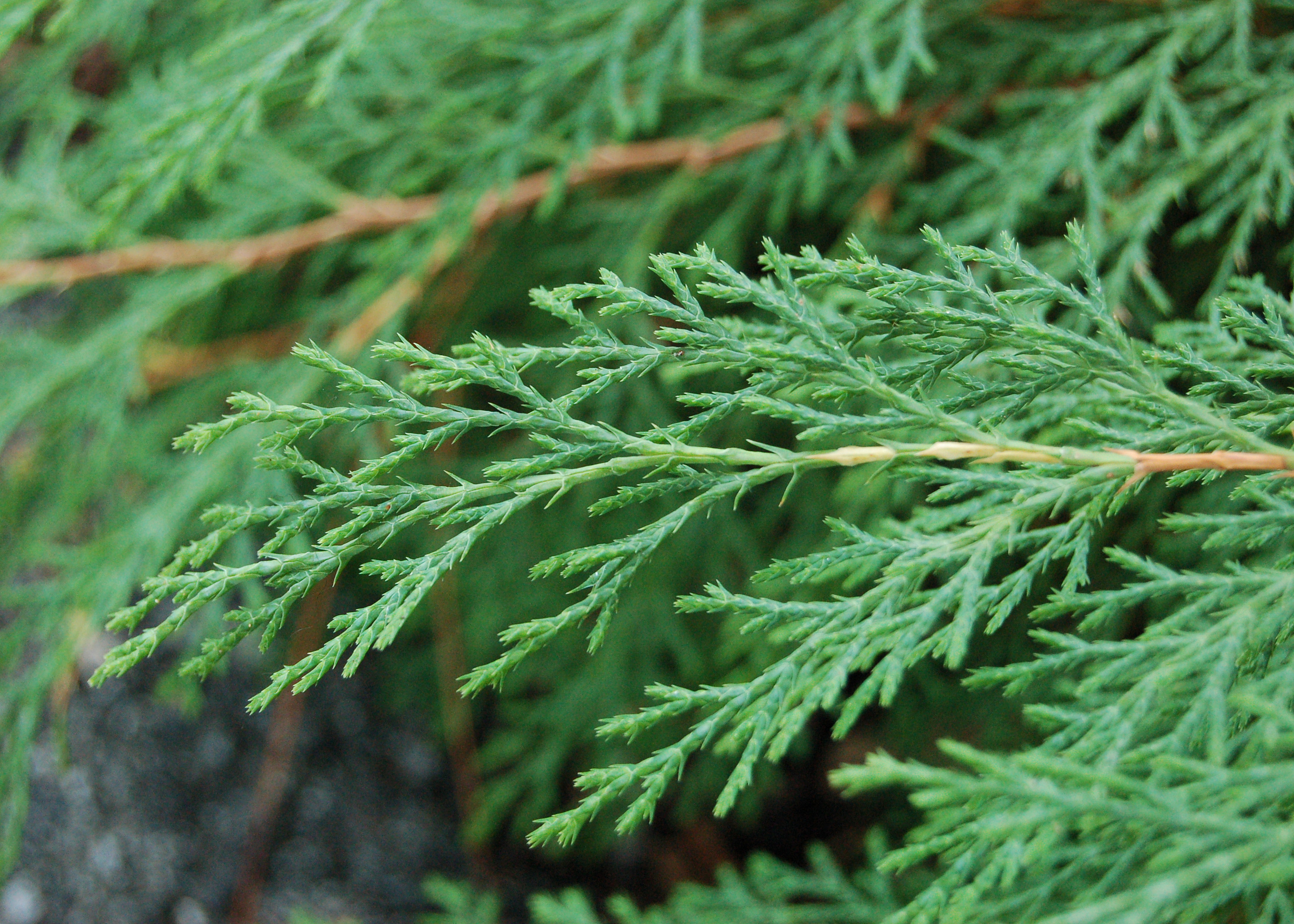
Close-up of scale-like leaves

Microbiota decussata is a prostrate shrub growing to 20–50 cm (8–20 in) in height, and spreading 2–5 m (6.6–16.4 ft) in width. The foliage forms flat sprays with scale-like leaves 2–4 mm long. The cones are among the smallest of any conifer, 2–3 mm long, green ripening brown in about eight months from pollination, and have four scales arranged in two opposite pairs. The seeds are 2 mm long, with no wing; there is usually only one seed in each cone, rarely two. The foliage sometimes turns brown in winter, giving the impression that the plant has died; but it revives in spring.

== Taxonomy ==
The monotypic genus Microbiota was discovered in 1921 and described in 1923, but political secrecy in the former Soviet Union prevented any knowledge of its existence outside the country for around 50 years.

Microbiota is generally accepted as being a distinct genus. It has been suggested from its cone structure and development, but not widely followed, that Microbiota could be included in the closely related genus Platycladus. Other fairly close relatives are the genera Juniperus and Cupressus.

== Cultivation ==
Microbiota decussata is grown as an ornamental plant for use as evergreen groundcover in gardens and parks. It is valued for its drought tolerance and considerable cold temperature and winter season conditions tolerance. It has gained the Royal Horticultural Society's Award of Garden Merit.
