= Cunninghamites =

Scientific classification
- Kingdom: Plantae
- Clade: Tracheophytes
- Clade: Gymnosperms
- Division: Pinophyta
- Class: Pinopsida
- Order: Cupressales
- Family: Cupressaceae
- Genus: †Cunninghamites; Presl in Sternberg, 1838

Type species
- †Cunninghamites oxycedrus Presl

Species
- †Cunninghamites australis Tenison-Woods †Cunninghamites elegans (Corda) Endlicher, 1847 †Cunninghamites lignitum (Sternberg) Kvacek †Cunninghamites oxycedrus Presl †Cunninghamites ubaghsii Debey ex Ubaghs †Cunninghamites recurvatus Hosius & Von Der Marck †Cunninghamites squamosus Heer

Extinct genus of conifers

Cunninghamites is an extinct genus of conifers in the cypress family, Cupressaceae, of the European Late Cretaceous flora.
