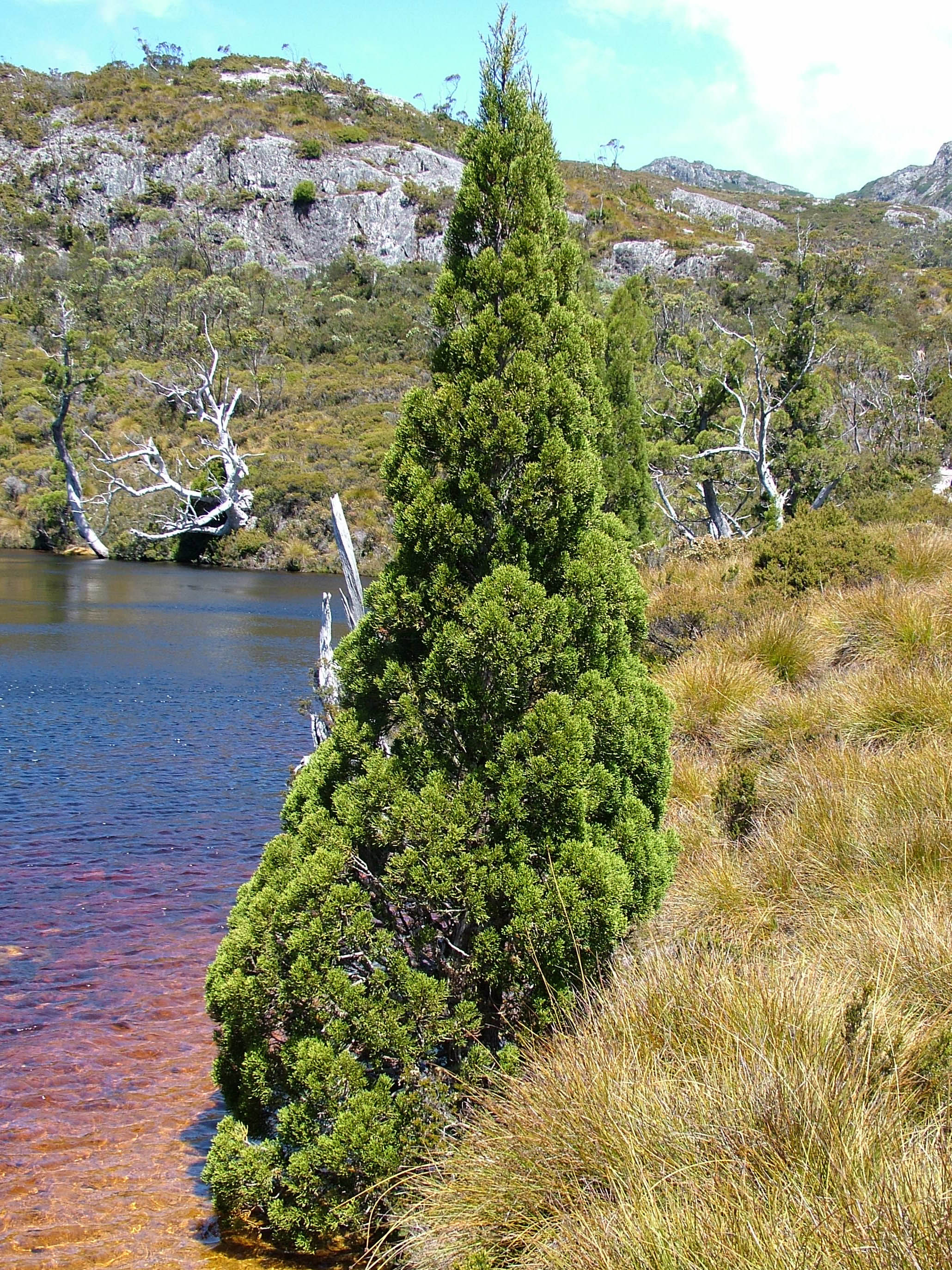
- Athrotaxis cupressoides
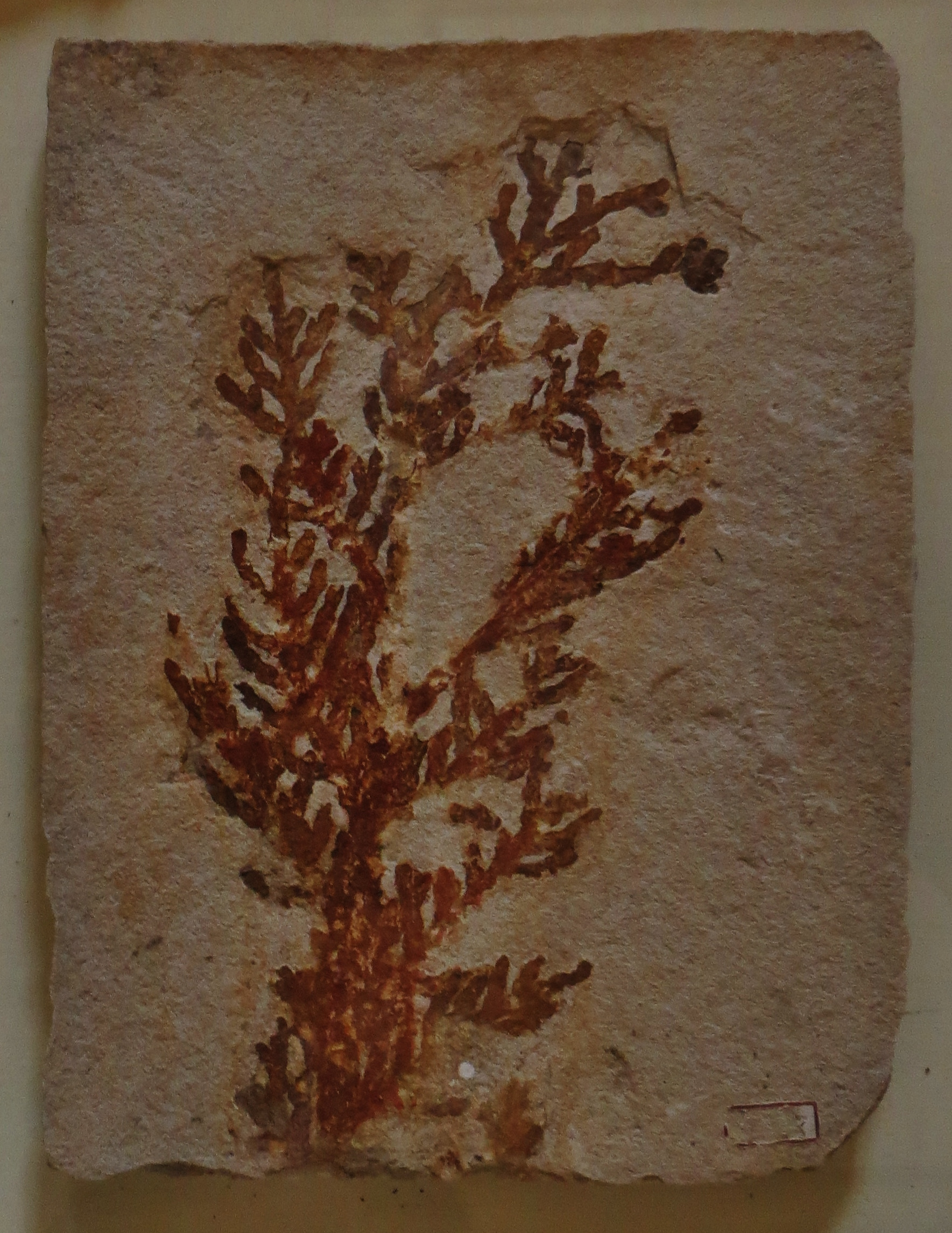
- Athrotaxites

Scientific classification
- Kingdom: Plantae
- Clade: Embryophytes
- Clade: Tracheophytes
- Clade: Gymnosperms
- Division: Pinophyta
- Class: Pinopsida
- Order: Cupressales
- Family: Cupressaceae
- Subfamily: Athrotaxidoideae; Quinn

Genera
- Athrotaxis; †Athrotaxites

= Athrotaxidoideae =

Athrotaxidoideae Temporal range: Jurassic–Recent

Subfamily of conifers

Athrotaxidoideae is a subfamily of conifers in the cypress family, Cupressaceae. There is one extant genus known as Athrotaxis. There is an extinct genus known as Athrotaxites that belongs to this subfamily which existed during the Cretaceous. Genetic studies show that athrotaxidoids might be close relatives of the redwood family.
