= Gnarled enamel =

Twisted orientation of Enamel Rods at Cusp

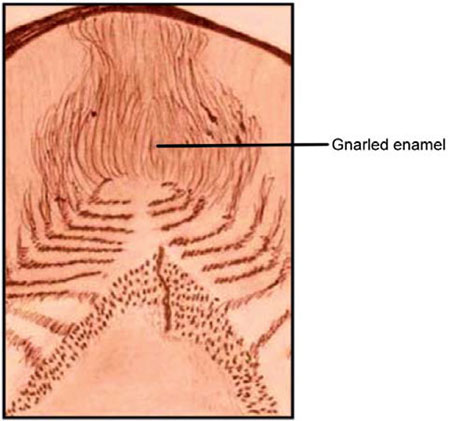
Gnarled Enamel

Gnarled enamel is a description of enamel seen in histologic sections of a tooth underneath a cusp. This is optical appearance of enamel. The enamel appears different and very complex under the cusp, but this is not due to a different arrangement of dental tissues. Instead, the enamel still has the same arrangement of enamel rods. The strange appearance results from the lines of enamel rods directed vertically under a cusp and from their orientation in a small circumference.

Gnarled enamel can sometimes be a problem for dentists; although experienced dentists have no problem identifying gnarled enamel and making the correct preparations, some inexperienced dentists face problems when performing a standard filling or root canal. The gnarled enamel can cause the drill problems and in some cases the dentist must replace the drill burr. The toughness of gnarled enamel varies from patient to patient and usually is nothing to be concerned about.
