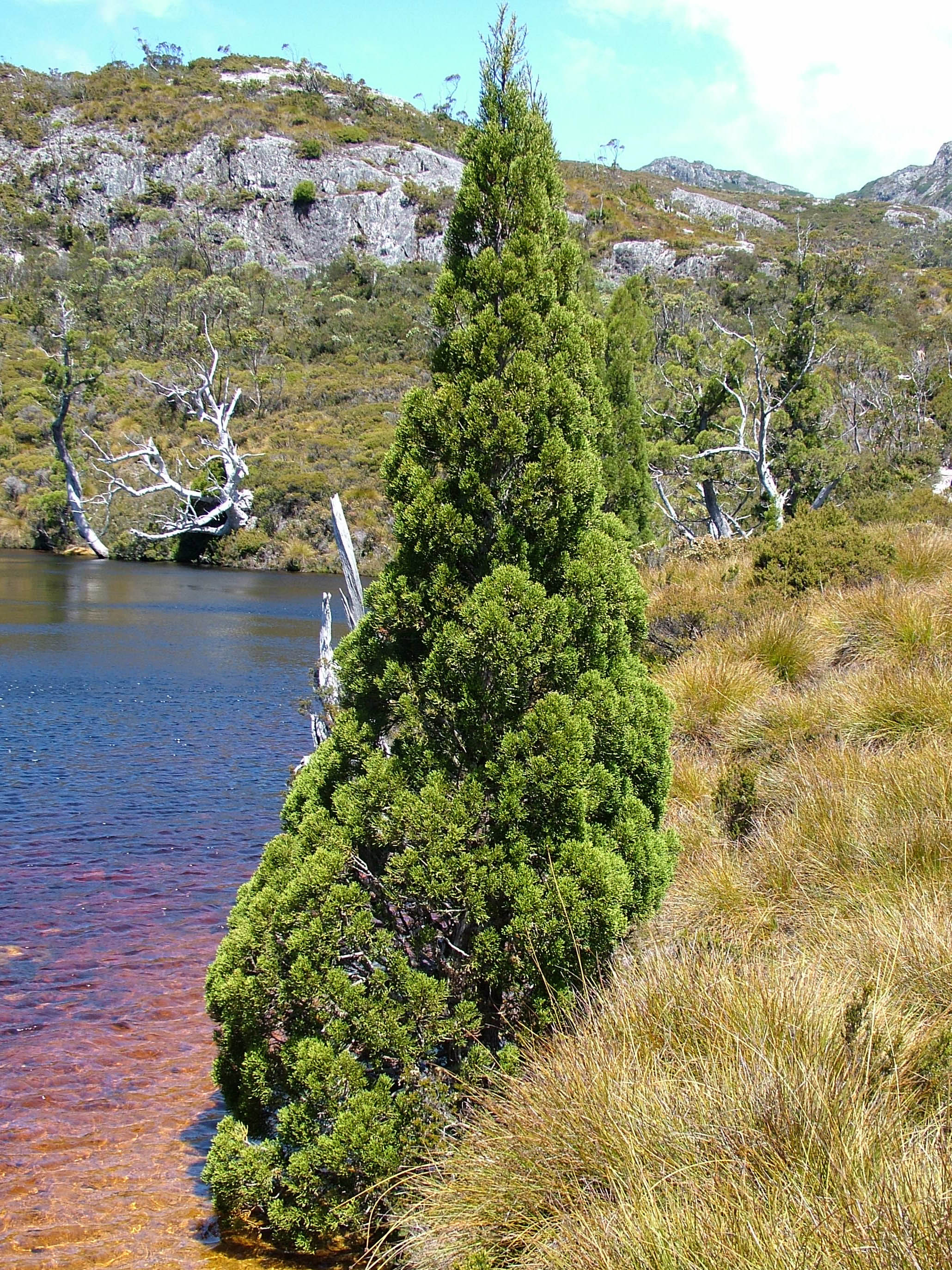
- Athrotaxis cupressoides

Scientific classification
- Kingdom: Plantae
- Clade: Tracheophytes
- Clade: Gymnosperms
- Division: Pinophyta
- Class: Pinopsida
- Order: Cupressales
- Family: Cupressaceae
- Subfamily: Athrotaxidoideae
- Genus: Athrotaxis; D.Don

Type species
- Athrotaxis selaginoides Don

Species
- See text

= Athrotaxis =

Athrotaxis Temporal range: Aptian–Recent

Genus of conifers

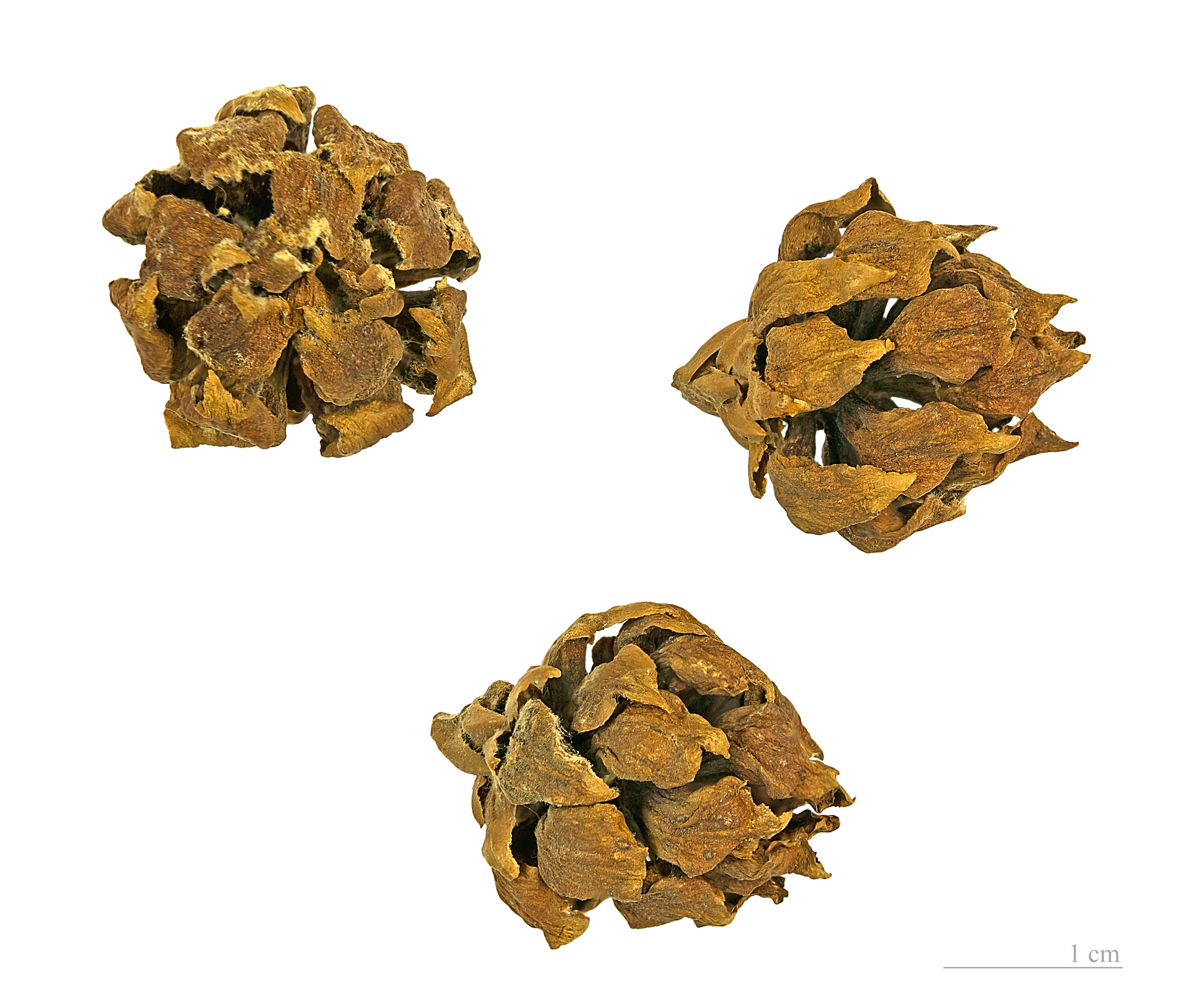
A. selaginoides seed cones.

Athrotaxis is a genus of two to three species (depending on taxonomic opinion) of conifers in the cypress family, Cupressaceae. The genus is endemic to western Tasmania, where they grow in high-elevation temperate rainforests. They are also considered alpine plants.

They are medium-sized evergreen trees, reaching 10–30 m (rarely 40 m) tall and 1-1.5 m trunk diameter. The leaves are scale-like, 3–14 mm long, are borne spirally on the shoots. The cones are globose to oval, 1–3 cm diameter, with 15-35 scales, each scale with 3-6 seeds; they are mature in 7–9 months after pollination, when they open to release the seeds. The male (pollen) cones are small, and shed their pollen in early spring.

They are very susceptible to bush fires, and have declined markedly in abundance due to accidental and deliberate fires since the European colonisation of Tasmania.

== Classification ==
=== Taxonomy ===
Athrotaxis is the only living genus of the subfamily Athrotaxidoideae. A 2021 molecular study found the Athrotaxidoideae to be the sister group to the Sequoioideae, which contains famously massive species such as the coast redwood (Sequoia sempervirens) and giant sequoia (Sequoiadendron giganteum). This is despite both subfamilies' current distributions being on entirely different hemispheres. The study indicates that both taxa diverged during the mid to late Jurassic. The oldest fossil of the genus is known from the Early Cretaceous (Aptian) of Santa Cruz Province in Argentina, South America, with other fossils of the genus known from New Zealand, eastern Australia, and possibly North America. Other fossils of the subfamily (such as Athrotaxites) are known from the Late Jurassic of Europe and India, as well as the Early Cretaceous of North America and China, as well as possibly the Early Cretaceous of Europe, and Late Cretaceous of South America and North America.

=== Species ===
Phylogeny of Athrotaxis

- - A. cupressoides Don ex Don
  - - A. ×laxifolia Hooker
    - A. selaginoides Don

The three taxa of Athrotaxis are variously treated as three distinct species, or as two species, with the third taxon being a hybrid between the other two. There is strong genetic evidence that the third taxon is a hybrid.

Image	Leaves	Scientific name	Description	Distribution
		Pencil Pine; Athrotaxis cupressoides D.Don.	Leaves short, 3–5 mm, adpressed tightly on the shoots. Cones small, 1-1.5 cm, scales with a small bract only covering the centre of the scale.	Tasmania, Australia.
		King Billy Pine or King William Pine; Athrotaxis selaginoides D.Don.	Leaves long, 8–14 mm, spreading out from the shoots. Cones large, 2–3 cm, scales with a large bract nearly completely covering the scale.	Tasmania, Australia.
		Athrotaxis X laxifolia Hook.	(A. cupressoides × A. selaginoides). Leaves short, 4–7 mm, spreading out from the shoots. Cones intermediate, 1.5-2.5 cm, scales with a medium bract covering most of the scale.	Tasmania, Australia.

== Cultivation and uses ==
The wood is scented and durable, and was extensively used in the past in Tasmania, but is now too rare for any cutting. All three make very attractive ornamental trees with luxuriant foliage, though they are generally only planted in arboretums or botanical gardens. Cultivation away from their native range is successful only in areas with high rainfall, mild winters, and cool summers, such as the British Isles, the Pacific Northwest of North America, and New Zealand.

Examples of the species and many of its leaf forms may be seen in the living collections at The Tasmanian Arboretum.
