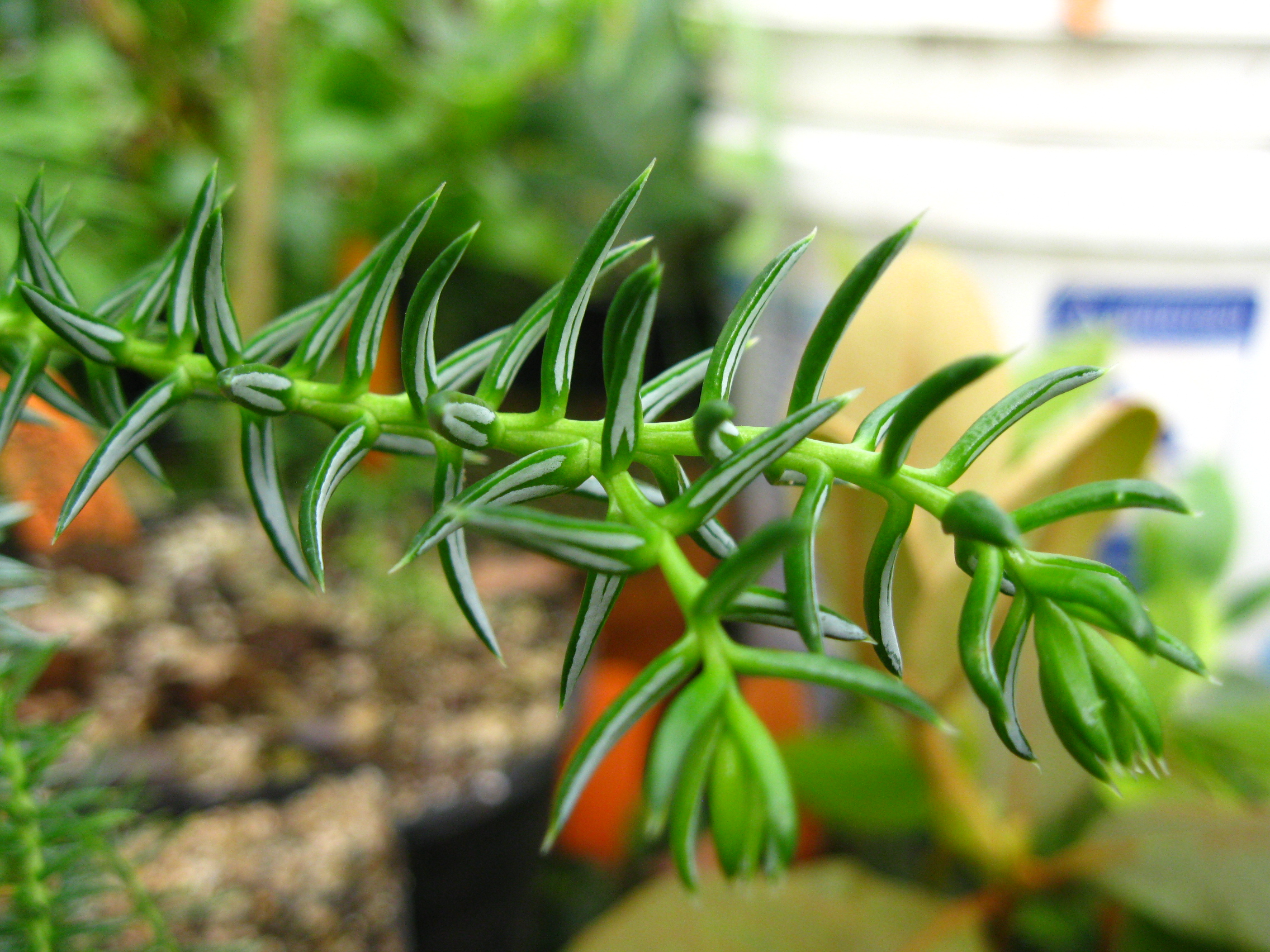
- Foliage

Conservation status
- Vulnerable (IUCN 3.1)

Scientific classification
- Kingdom: Plantae
- Clade: Embryophytes
- Clade: Tracheophytes
- Clade: Gymnosperms
- Division: Pinophyta
- Class: Pinopsida
- Order: Cupressales
- Family: Cupressaceae
- Genus: Athrotaxis
- Species: A. selaginoides

Binomial name
- Athrotaxis selaginoides D.Don (1838)

Synonyms
- Athrotaxis alpina Van Houtte ex Gordon & Glend. (1858); Athrotaxis gunneana Hook. ex Carrière (1867); Athrotaxis imbricata Carrière (1867); Athrotaxis selaginoides var. pyramidata Mouill. (1898); Cunninghamia selaginoides Zucc. (1842)

= Athrotaxis selaginoides =

Growth Patterns

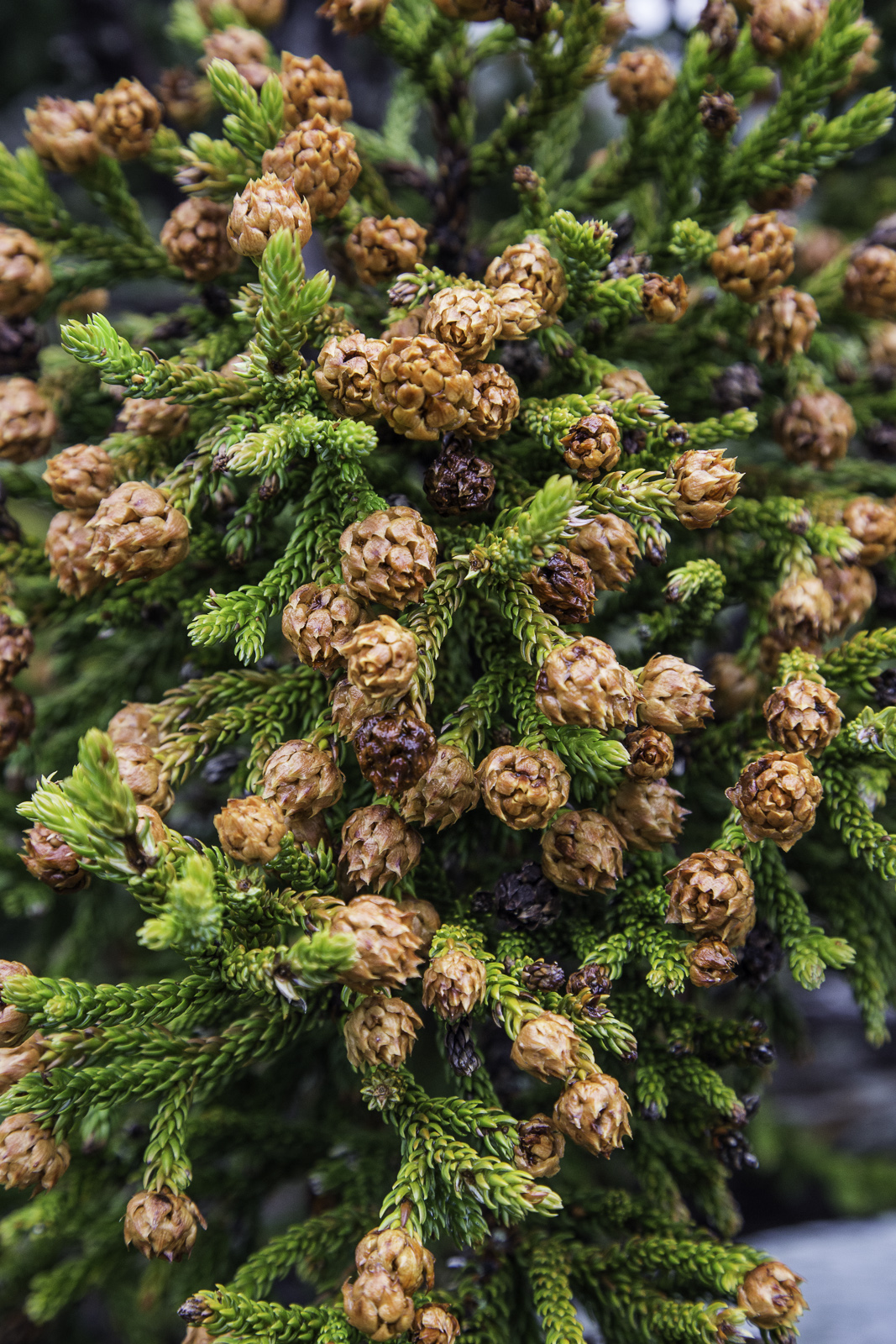
Cones during mast seeding event (Austral summer 2015).

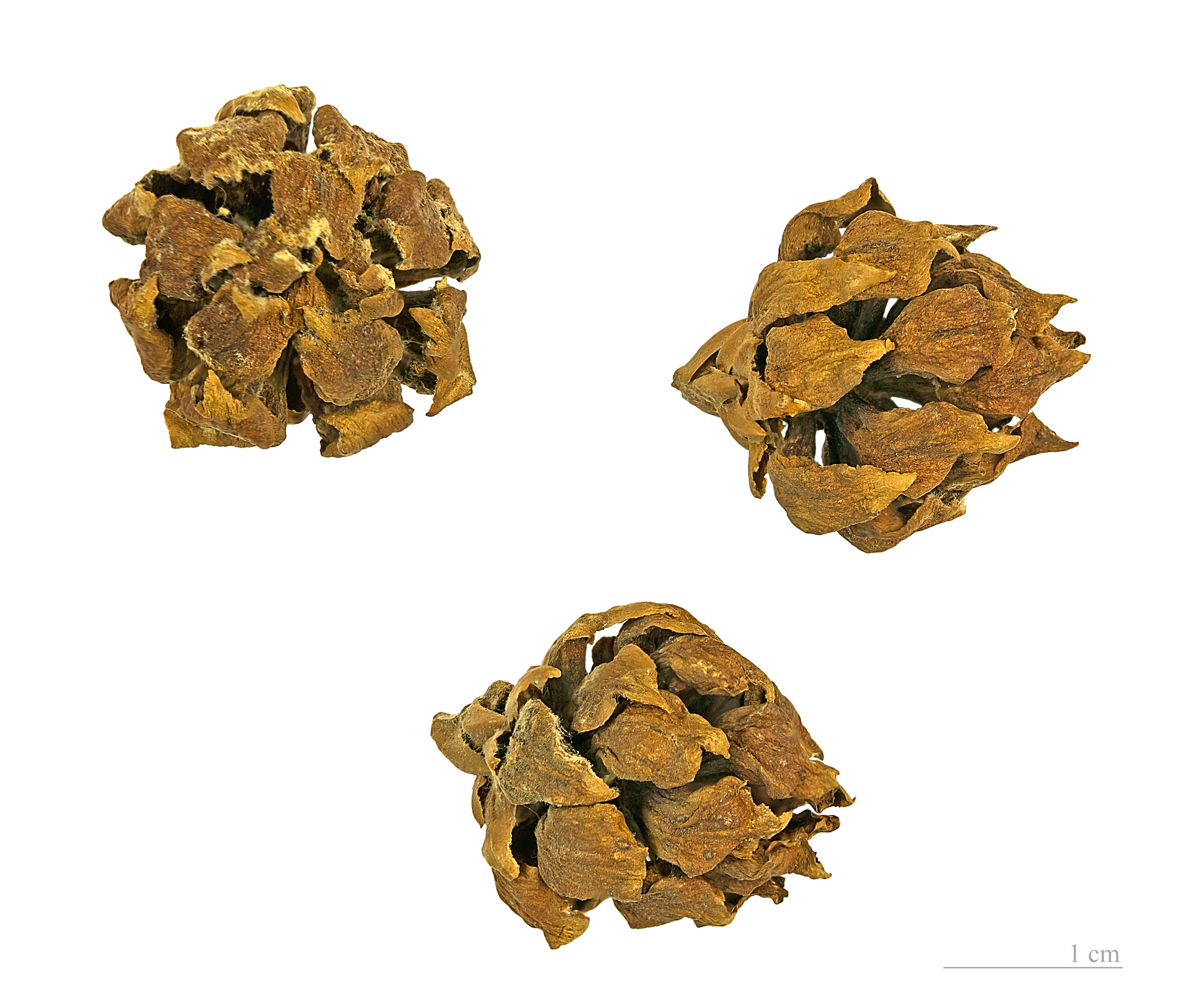
Cones

Athrotaxis selaginoides is a species of conifer in the cypress family, Cupressaceae, endemic to Tasmania, where it grows in mountainous areas at 400–1,120 m elevation. Snow frequently falls here in the colder months, though possible all year round. It is often called King Billy pine or King William pine (believed to be in reference to William Lanne, an Aboriginal Tasmanian man), although it is not a true pine.

== Description ==
It is a coniferous tree growing to 50–100 m tall, with a trunk up to 2.0m diameter. The leaves are claw-like, 7–18 mm long and 3–4 mm broad, arranged spirally on the shoots. The seed cones are globose, 15–30 mm diameter, with 20–30 spirally-arranged scales; they are mature about six months after pollination. The pollen cones are 4–5 mm long.

== Decline ==
The main cause of past decline has been fire, with about one third of its habitat burnt in the twentieth century. Like the other two Athrotaxis species, A. selaginoides is sensitive to fire. Another cause of past decline has been logging. The overall decline is estimated to be about 40% over the last 200 years. This is within the three generation time limit where one generation is estimated to be at least 100 years. Although 84% of forests are now in protected areas, fires still are a potential hazard. Tasmanian government policy precludes logging of this species in and outside these protected areas.

== Growth pattern ==
Athrotaxis selaginoides is sensitive to temperature. The tree-ring chronologies developed from this species have shown distinct responses to temperature variations. In the southern sites, the ring width (RW) and earlywood (EW) are strongly related to cool season temperature (July–October). In contrast, in the northern sites, RW and EW are more strongly related to summer temperatures (December–February). This indicates that the growth of A. selaginoides and its wood formation processes are influenced by temperature conditions.

== Cultivation ==
Examples of the species can be viewed at The Tasmanian Arboretum. Away from its native range, it is occasionally cultivated as an ornamental tree in northwestern Europe. Bedgebury National Pinetum has about fifty trees in its collection, the most of them planted in the Conifer Conservation Project Area. It succeeds in Scotland where it receives the necessary rainfall for its good growth and produces fertile seeds there.
