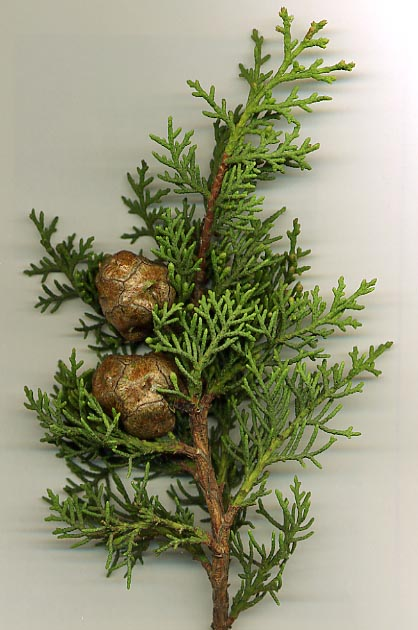
- Cupressus sempervirens foliage and cones

Scientific classification
- Kingdom: Plantae
- Clade: Tracheophytes
- Clade: Gymnosperms
- Division: Pinophyta
- Class: Pinopsida
- Order: Cupressales
- Family: Cupressaceae; Bartlett

Subfamilies
- Athrotaxidoideae; Callitroideae; Cunninghamioideae; Cupressoideae; Sequoioideae; Taiwanioideae; Taxodioideae; Incertae sedis: †Austrohamia; †Cunninghamites; †Mesocyparis

= Cupressaceae =

Cupressaceae Temporal range: Early Jurassic–Present (possible Late Triassic records)

Cypress family of conifers

Cupressaceae, the cypress family, is a family of conifers. The family includes 27–30 genera (17 monotypic), which include the cypresses, junipers, and redwoods, with about 130–140 species in total. They are monoecious, subdioecious or (rarely) dioecious trees and shrubs up to 116 m (381 ft) tall. The bark of mature trees is commonly orange- to red-brown and of stringy texture, often flaking or peeling in vertical strips, but smooth, scaly or hard and square-cracked in some species. The family reached its peak of diversity during the Mesozoic era.

== Description ==
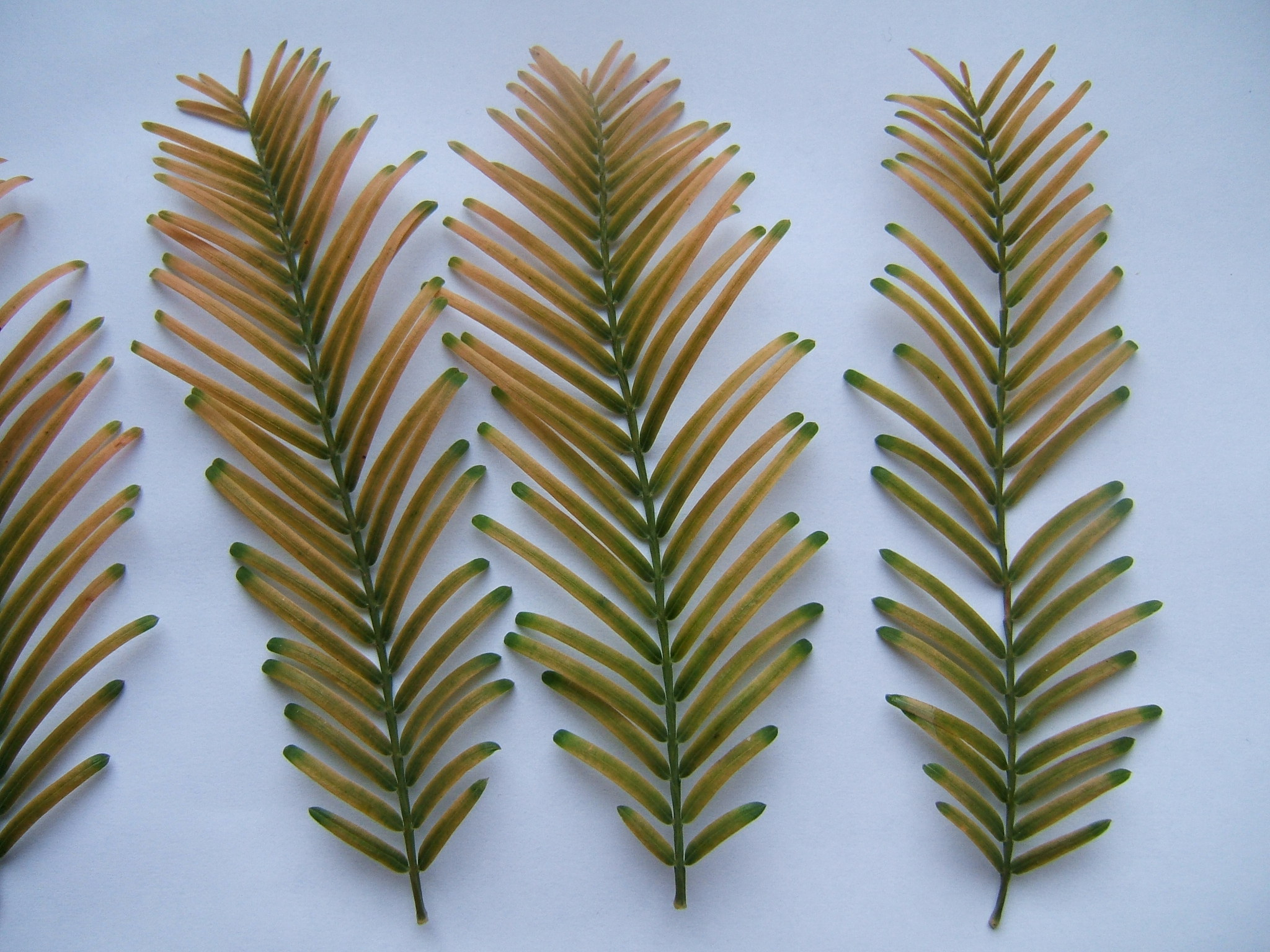
Fallen foliage sprays (cladoptosis) of Metasequoia

The leaves are arranged either spirally, in decussate pairs (opposite pairs, each pair at 90° to the previous pair) or in decussate whorls of three or four, depending on the genus. On young plants, the leaves are needle-like, becoming small and scale-like on mature plants of many genera; some genera and species retain needle-like leaves throughout their lives. Old leaves are mostly not shed individually, but in small sprays of foliage (cladoptosis); exceptions are leaves on the shoots that develop into branches. These leaves eventually fall off individually when the bark starts to flake. Most are evergreen with the leaves persisting 2–10 years, but three genera (Glyptostrobus, Metasequoia and Taxodium) are deciduous or include deciduous species.

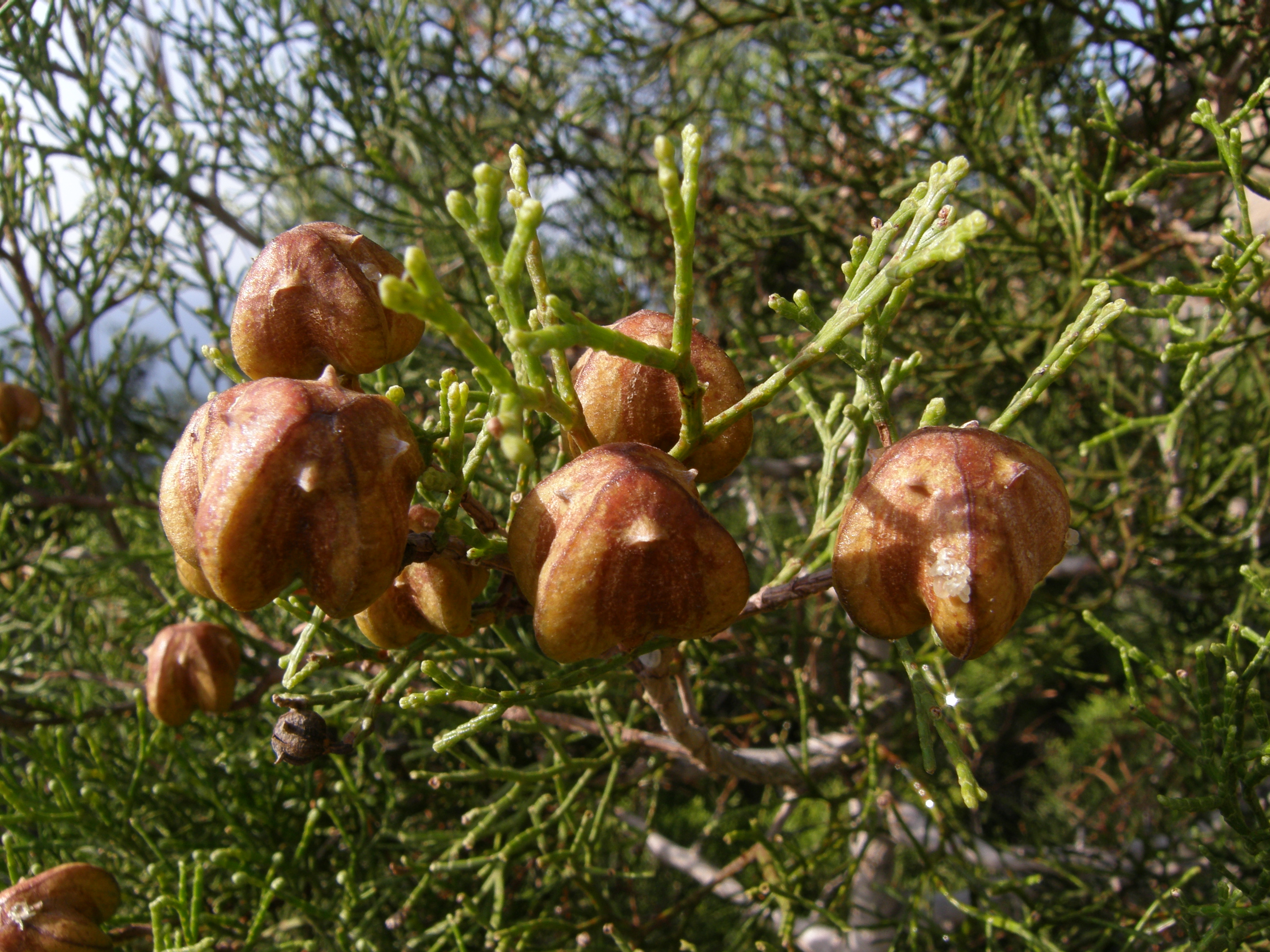
Tetraclinis cones

The seed cones are either woody, leathery, or (in Juniperus) berry-like and fleshy, with one to several ovules per scale. The bract scale and ovuliferous scale are fused together except at the apex, where the bract scale is often visible as a short spine (often called an umbo) on the ovuliferous scale. As with the foliage, the cone scales are arranged spirally, decussate (opposite) or whorled, depending on the genus. The seeds are mostly small and somewhat flattened, with two narrow wings, one down each side of the seed; rarely (e.g. Actinostrobus) triangular in section with three wings; in some genera (e.g. Glyptostrobus and Libocedrus), one of the wings is significantly larger than the other, and in some others (e.g. Juniperus, Microbiota, Platycladus, and Taxodium) the seed is larger and wingless. The seedlings usually have two cotyledons, but in some species up to six. The pollen cones are more uniform in structure across the family, 1–20 mm long, with the scales again arranged spirally, decussate (opposite) or whorled, depending on the genus; they may be borne singly at the apex of a shoot (most genera), in the leaf axils (Cryptomeria), in dense clusters (Cunninghamia and Juniperus drupacea), or on discrete long pendulous panicle-like shoots (Metasequoia and Taxodium).

Cupressaceae is a widely distributed conifer family, with a near-global range in all continents except for Antarctica, stretching from 70°N in arctic Norway (Juniperus communis) to 55°S in southernmost Chile (Pilgerodendron uviferum), further south than any other conifer species. Juniperus indica reaches 4930 m altitude in Tibet. Most habitats on land are occupied, with the exceptions of polar tundra and tropical lowland rainforest (though several species are important components of temperate rainforests and tropical highland cloud forests); they are also rare in deserts, with only a few species able to tolerate severe drought, notably Cupressus dupreziana in the central Sahara. Despite the wide overall distribution, many genera and species show very restricted relictual distributions, and many are endangered species.

The world's largest (Sequoiadendron giganteum) and current tallest (Sequoia sempervirens) trees belong to the Cupressaceae, as do six of the ten longest-lived tree species.

== Classification ==
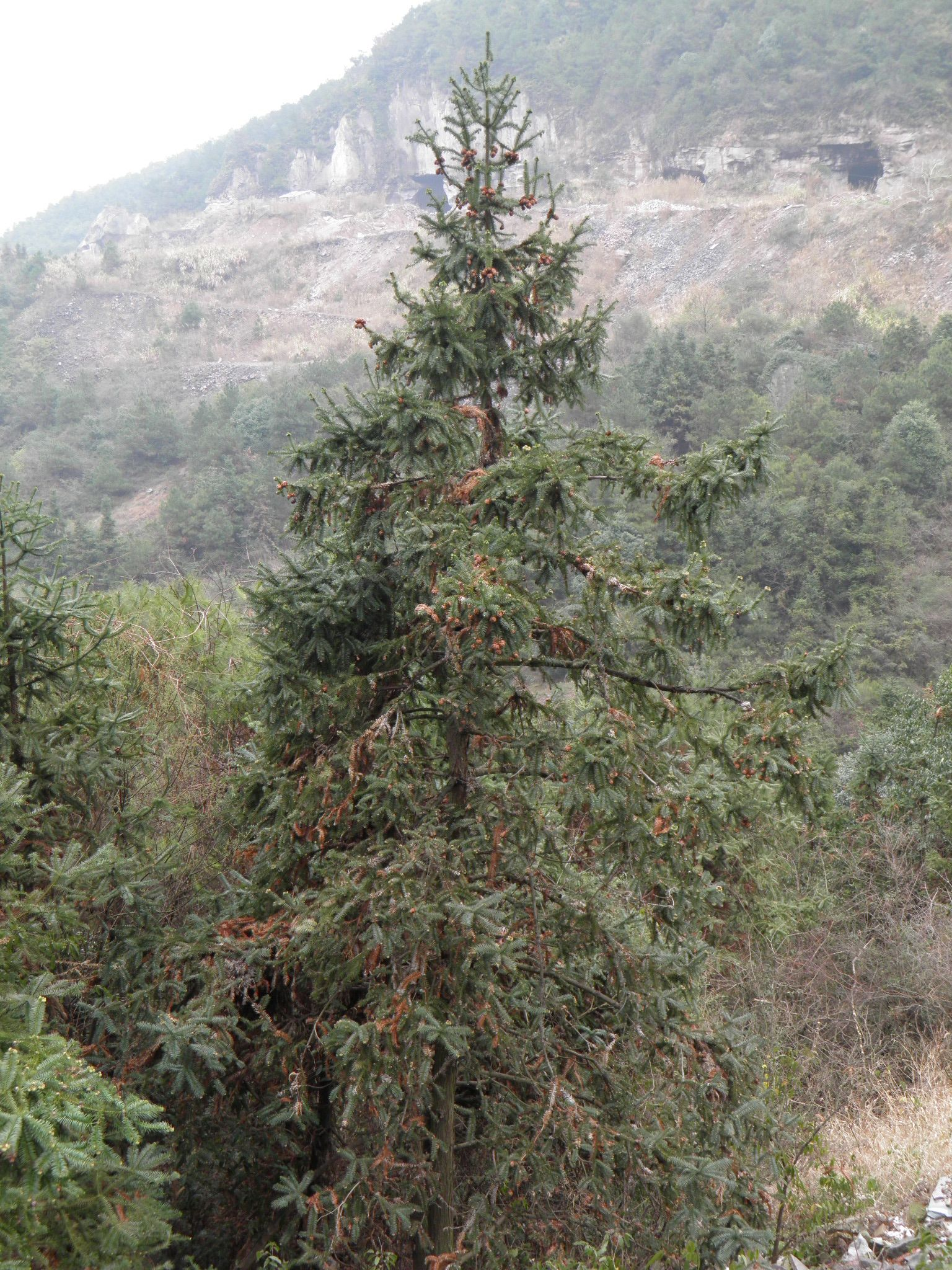
Cunninghamia Fangshan, Zhejiang, China

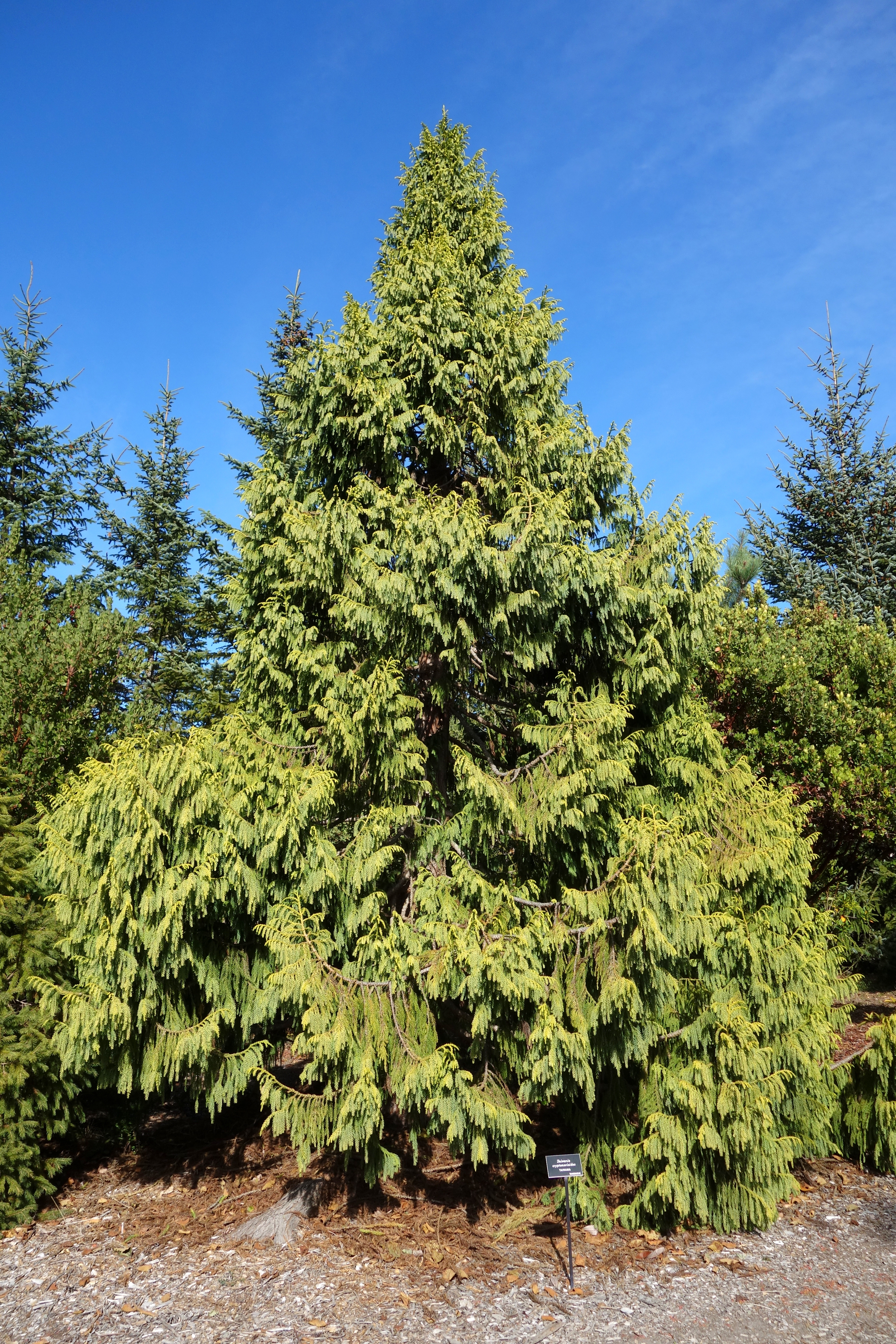
Taiwania cryptomerioides Mendocino Coast Botanical Gardens, Fort Bragg

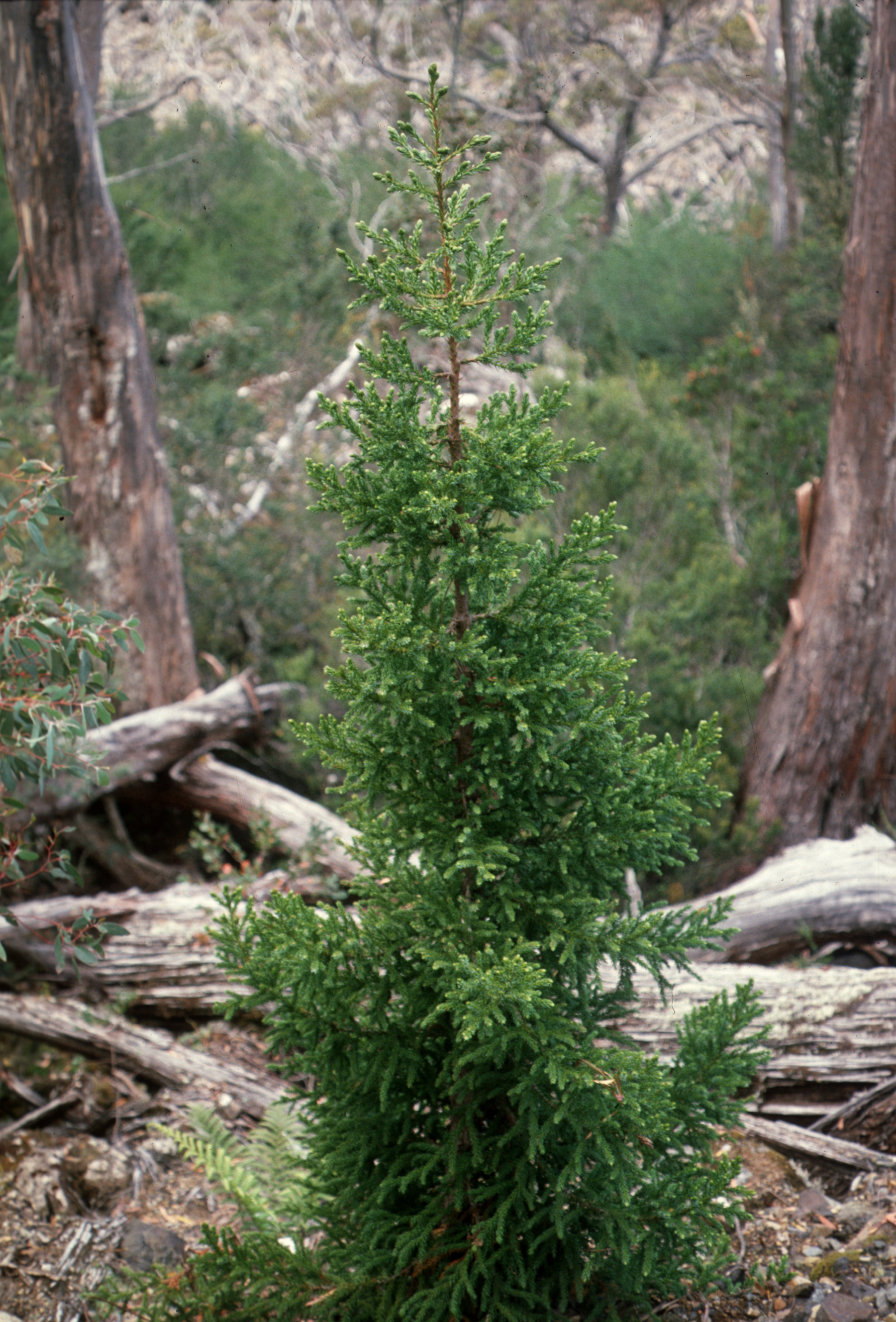
Athrotaxis selaginoides, Mt Field National Park, Tasmania

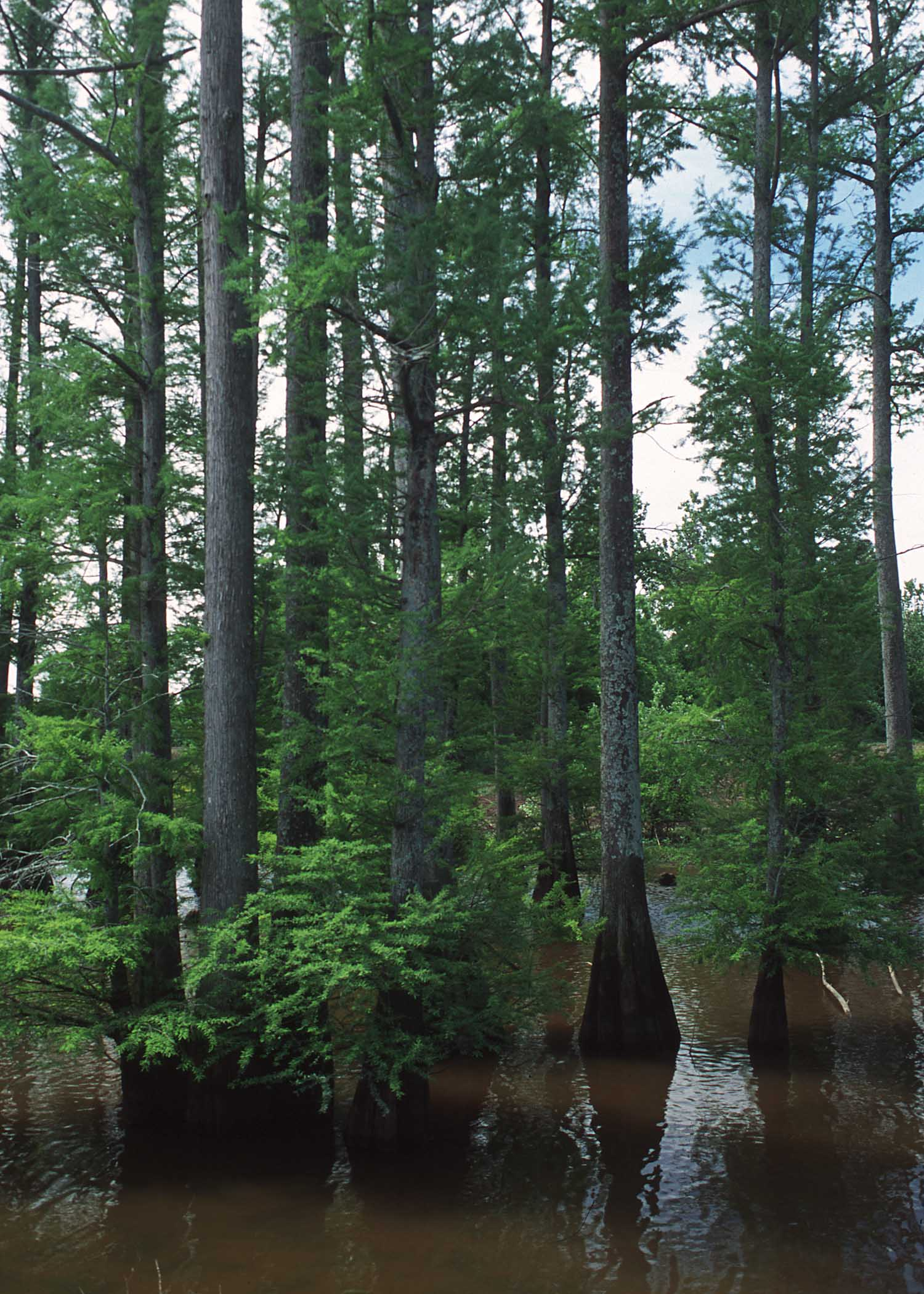
Taxodium distichum in an oxbow lake, central Mississippi

Molecular and morphological studies have expanded Cupressaceae to include the genera of Taxodiaceae, previously treated as a distinct family, but now shown not to differ from the Cupressaceae in any consistent characteristics. The member genera have been placed into five distinct subfamilies of Cupressaceae, Athrotaxidoideae, Cunninghamioideae, Sequoioideae, Taiwanioideae, and Taxodioideae, which form a grade basal to Cupressaceae sensu stricto, containing Callitroideae and Cupressoideae. The former Taxodiaceae genus, Sciadopitys, has been moved to a separate monotypic family Sciadopityaceae due to being genetically distinct from the rest of the Cupressaceae. In some classifications Cupressaceae is raised to an order, Cupressales. Molecular evidence supports Cupressaceae being the sister group to the yews (family Taxaceae), from which it diverged during the early-mid Triassic. The clade comprising both is sister to Sciadopityaceae, which diverged from them during the early-mid Permian. The oldest definitive record of Cupressaceae is Austrohamia minuta from the Early Jurassic (Pliensbachian) of Patagonia, known from many parts of the plant. The reproductive structures of Austrohamia have strong similarities to those of the primitive living cypress genera Taiwania and Cunninghamia. By the Middle to Late Jurassic Cupressaceae were abundant in warm temperate–tropical regions of the Northern Hemisphere. The diversity of the group continued to increase during the Cretaceous period. The earliest appearance of the non-taxodiaceous Cupressaceae (the clade containing Callitroideae and Cupressoideae) is in the mid-Cretaceous, represented by "Widdringtonia" americana from the Cenomanian of North America, and they subsequently diversified during the Late Cretaceous and early Cenozoic.

The family is divided into seven subfamilies, based on genetic and morphological analysis as follows:

- Subfamily Cunninghamioideae (Zucc. ex Endl.) Quinn
  - Cunninghamia R.Br.
  - † Elatides Middle Jurassic- Early Cretaceous, Eurasia (possibly North America)
  - † Hughmillerites Late Jurassic-Early Cretaceous Europe, North America
  - † Sewardiodendron Middle Jurassic, Asia
  - † Scitistrobus Middle Jurassic, Europe
  - † Pentakonos Early Cretaceous, Asia
  - † Acanthostrobus Late Cretaceous, North America
  - † Mikasostrobus Late Cretaceous, Japan
  - † Parataiwania Late Cretaceous, Japan
  - † Ohanastrobus Late Cretaceous, Japan
  - † Nishidastrobus Late Cretaceous, Japan
  - † Cunninghamiostrobus Early Cretaceous-Oligocene Japan, North America
- Subfamily Taiwanioideae L.C.Li
  - Taiwania Hayata
- Subfamily Athrotaxidoideae L.C.Li
  - Athrotaxis D.Don – Tasmanian cedar
- Subfamily Sequoioideae Saxton
  - Metasequoia Hu & W.C.Cheng – dawn redwood
  - Sequoia Endl. – coast redwood
  - Sequoiadendron J.Buchholz – giant sequoia
- Subfamily Taxodioideae Endl. ex K.Koch
  - Cryptomeria D.Don – sugi
  - Glyptostrobus Endl. – Chinese swamp cypress
  - Taxodium Rich. – bald cypress
- Subfamily Callitroideae Saxton
  - Actinostrobus Miq. – cypress-pine
  - Austrocedrus Florin & Boutelje
  - Callitris Vent. – cypress-pine
  - Diselma Hook.f.
  - Fitzroya Hook.f. ex Lindl. – alerce
  - Libocedrus Endl.
  - Neocallitropsis Florin
  - Papuacedrus H.L.Li
  - Pilgerodendron Florin
  - Widdringtonia Endl.
- Subfamily Cupressoideae Rich. ex Sweet
  - Callitropsis Kurz – Nootka cypress
  - Calocedrus Kurz – incense-cedar
  - Chamaecyparis Spach – cypress
  - Cupressus L. – cypress
  - Fokienia A.Henry & H.H.Thomas – Fujian cypress
  - Hesperocyparis Bartel & R. A. Price
  - Juniperus L. – juniper
  - Microbiota Kom.
  - Platycladus Spach – Chinese arborvitae
  - Tetraclinis Mast.
  - Thuja L. – thuja or arborvitae
  - Thujopsis Siebold & Zucc. ex Endl. – hiba
  - Xanthocyparis Farjon & T. H. Nguyên – golden cypress

incertae sedis:

- † Inaperturopollenites
- † Austrohamia
- † Cunninghamites
- † Mesocyparis
- † Cupressinoxylon
- † Protocupressinoxylon
- † Peripollenites
- † Cupressinocladus
- † Ditaxocladus
- † Taxodioxylon
- † Widdringtonites
- † Conites?

A 2010 study of Actinostrobus and Callitris places the three species of Actinostrobus within an expanded Callitris based on analysis of 42 morphological and anatomical characters.

Phylogeny based on 2000 study of morphological and molecular data. Several further papers have suggested the segregation Cupressus species into four total genera.

- Cupressaceae
  - - Cunninghamioideae
      - Cunninghamia
  - - - Taiwanioideae
        Taiwania
    - - - Athrotaxidoideae
          Athrotaxis
      - - - Sequoioideae
            - Metasequoia
            - - Sequoia
              - Sequoiadendron
        - - - Taxodioideae
              - Cryptomeria
              - - Glyptostrobus
                - Taxodium
          - - Callitroideae
              - - Austrocedrus
                - - Papuacedrus
                  - - Libocedrus
                    - Pilgerodendron
              - - - Widdringtonia
                  - - Diselma
                    - Fitzroya
                - - Neocallitropsis
                  - - Actinostrobus
                    - Callitris (sometimes including Actinostrobus and Neocallitropsis)
            - Cupressoideae
              - - Thuja
                - Thujopsis
              - - Chamaecyparis (sometimes including Fokienia)
                - - - Calocedrus
                    - - Tetraclinis
                      - - Microbiota
                        - Platycladus
                  - - Cupressus (sometimes split into Callitropsis, Cupressus, Hesperocyparis, and Xanthocyparis)
                    - Juniperus

A 2021 molecular study supported a very similar phylogeny but with some slight differences, along with the splitting of Cupressus (found to be paraphyletic):

- Cupressaceae
  - - Cunninghamioideae
      Cunninghamia
  - - - Taiwanioideae
        Taiwania
    - - - Athrotaxidoideae
          Athrotaxis
        - Sequoioideae
          - Metasequoia
          - - Sequoia
            - Sequoiadendron
      - - - Taxodioideae
            - Cryptomeria
            - - Glyptostrobus
              - Taxodium
        - - Callitroideae
            - - Austrocedrus
              - Papuacedrus
            - - Libocedrus
              - Pilgerodendron
            - - - Widdringtonia
                - - Diselma
                  - Fitzroya
              - - Neocallitropsis
                - Callitris
          - Cupressoideae
            - - Thuja
              - Thujopsis
            - - - Chamaecyparis
                - Fokienia
              - - - Calocedrus
                  - - Tetraclinis
                    - - Microbiota
                      - Platycladus
                - - - Cupressus (sensu stricto)
                    - Juniperus
                  - - Xanthocyparis
                    - - Hesperocyparis
                      - Callitropsis

== Uses ==
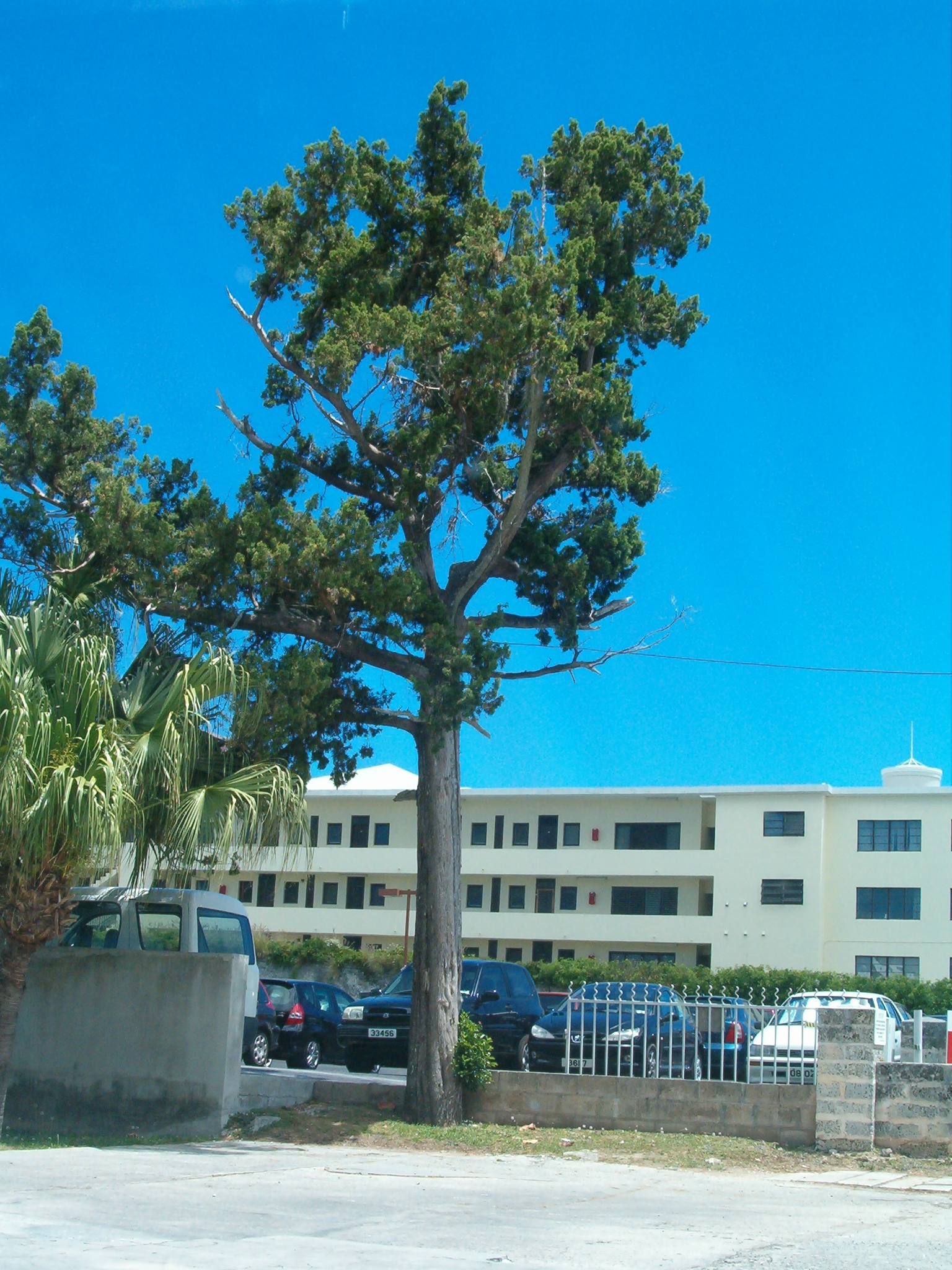
Juniperus bermudiana was the key to Bermuda's shipbuilding industry, and used in building houses, and in furniture. It also comprised the habitat for other endemic and native species, and provided Bermudians with shelter from wind and sun.

Many of the species are important timber sources, especially in the genera Calocedrus, Chamaecyparis, Cryptomeria, Cunninghamia, Cupressus, Sequoia, Taxodium, and Thuja. Calocedrus decurrens is the main wood used to make wooden pencils, and is also used in chests, paneling, and flooring. In China, cypress wood, known as baimu or bomu, was carved into furniture, using notably Cupressus funebris, and particularly in tropical areas, Fujian cypress and the aromatic wood of Glyptostrobus pensilis. Juniperus virginiana has used by Native Americans for waymarking. Its heartwood is fragrant and used in clothes chests, drawers and closets to repel moths. It is a source of juniper oil used in perfumes and medicines. The wood is also used as long lasting fenceposts and for bows.

Several genera are important in horticulture. Junipers are planted as evergreen trees, shrubs, and groundcovers. Hundreds of cultivars have been developed, including plants with blue, grey, or yellow foliage. Chamaecyparis and Thuja also provide hundreds of dwarf cultivars as well as trees, including Lawson's cypress. Dawn redwood is widely planted as an ornamental tree because of its excellent horticultural qualities, rapid growth and status as a living fossil. Giant sequoia is a popular ornamental tree and is occasionally grown for timber. Giant sequoia, Leyland cypress, and Arizona cypress are grown to a small extent as Christmas trees.

Some species have significant cultural importance. The ahuehuete (Taxodium mucronatum) is the national tree of Mexico. Coast redwood and giant sequoia were jointly designated the state tree of California, and are major tourist attractions where they grow naturally. Parks such as Redwood National and State Parks and Giant Sequoia National Monument protect almost half the remaining stands of Coast Redwoods and Giant sequoias. Bald cypress is the state tree of Louisiana. Bald cypress, often festooned with Spanish moss, of southern swamps are another tourist attraction. They can be seen at Big Cypress National Preserve in Florida. Bald cypress "knees" are often sold as souvenirs, made into lamps, or carved to make folk art. Monterey cypresses are often visited by tourists and photographers, particularly a tree known as the Lone Cypress.

The fleshy cones of Juniperus communis are used to flavour gin.

Native Americans and early European explorers used Thuja leaves as a cure for scurvy. Distillation of Fokienia roots produces an essential oil called pemou oil used in medicine and cosmetics.

== Chemistry ==
The Cupressaceae trees contain a wide range of extractives, especially terpenes and terpenoids, both of which have strong and often pleasant odors.

The heartwood, bark and leaves are the tree parts richest in terpenes. Some of these compounds are widely distributed in other trees as well, and some are typical for Cupressaceae family. The most known terpenoids found in conifers are sesquiterpenoids, diterpenes and tropolones. Diterpenes are commonly found in different types of conifers and are not typical for this family. Some sesquiterpenoids (e.g. bisabolanes, cubenanes, guaianes, ylanganes, himachalanes, longifolanes, longibornanes, longipinanes, cedranes, thujopsanes) also present in Pinaceae, Podocarpaceae and Taxodiaceae. Meanwhile, chamigranes, cuparanes, widdranes and acoranes are more distinctive for Cupressaceae. Tropolone derivatives, such as nootkatin, chanootin, thujaplicinol and hinokitiol are particularly characteristic for Cupressaceae.

== Disease vectors ==
Several genera are an alternate host of Gymnosporangium rust, which damages apples and other related trees in the subfamily Maloideae.

== Allergenicity ==
The pollen of many genera of Cupressaceae is allergenic, causing major hay fever problems in areas where they are abundant, most notably by Cryptomeria japonica (sugi) pollen in Japan. Highly allergenic species of cypress with an OPALS allergy scale rating of 8 out of 10 or higher include: Taxodium, Cupressus, Callitris, Chamaecyparis, and the males and monoicous variants of Austrocedrus and Widdringtonia. However, the females of some species have a very low potential for causing allergies (an OPALS allergy scale rating of 2 or lower) including Austrocedrus females and Widdringtonia females.
