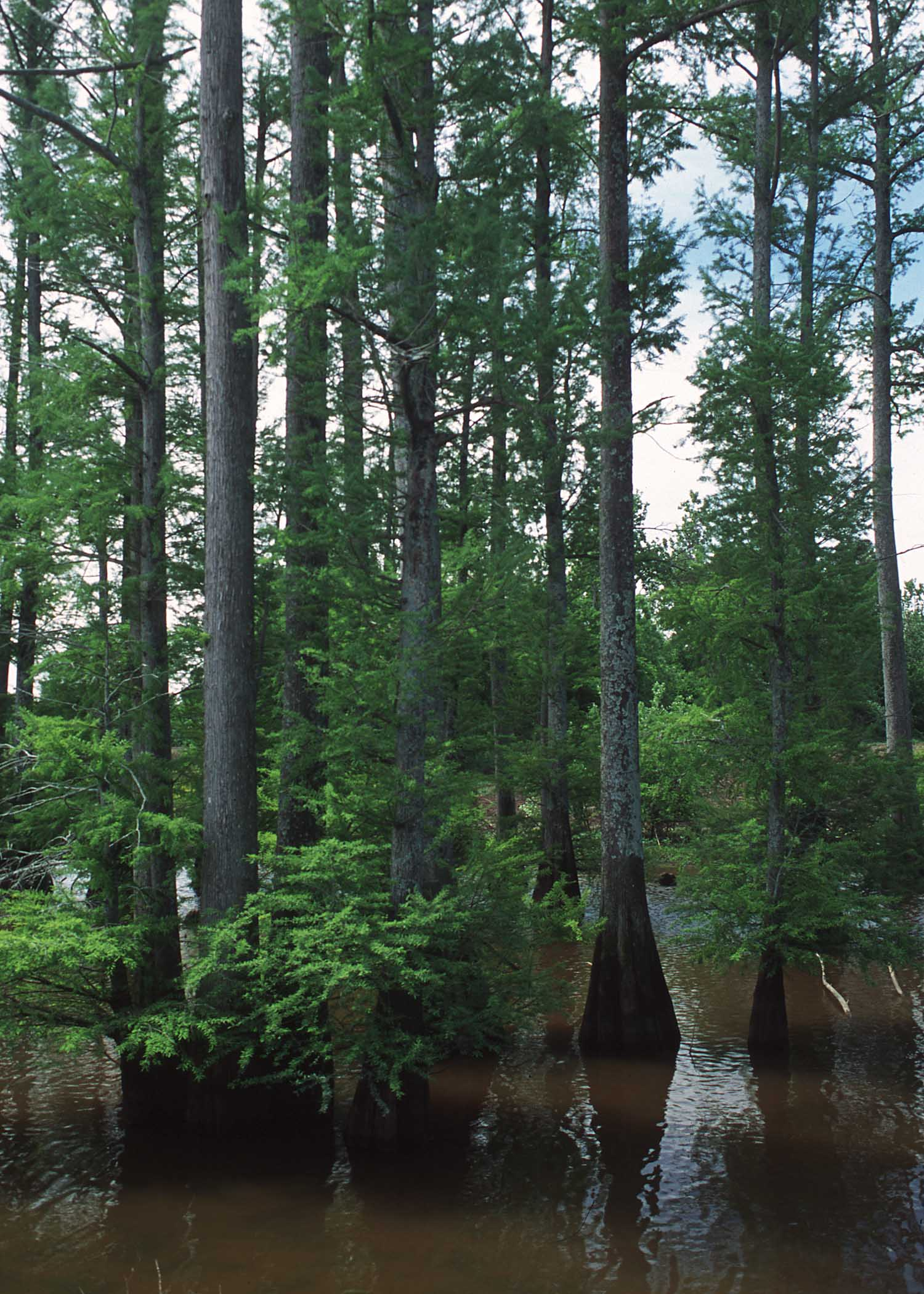
- Bald Cypress forest in a central Mississippi lake

Scientific classification
- Kingdom: Plantae
- Clade: Embryophytes
- Clade: Tracheophytes
- Clade: Spermatophytes
- Clade: Gymnosperms
- Division: Pinophyta
- Class: Pinopsida
- Order: Cupressales
- Family: Cupressaceae
- Subfamily: Taxodioideae

Genera
- Taxodium; Glyptostrobus; Cryptomeria

= Taxodioideae =

Taxodioideae Temporal range: Middle Jurassic-Present ~170–0 Ma

Subfamily of conifers

Taxodioideae is a subfamily in Cupressaceae.

== Genera ==
Image	Genus	Living Species
	Taxodium Rich.	Taxodium ascendens Brongn.; Taxodium distichum (L.) Rich.; Taxodium mucronatum Ten.
	Glyptostrobus Endl.	Glyptostrobus pensilis (Staunton ex D.Don) K.Koch
	Cryptomeria D.Don	Cryptomeria japonica (L.f.) D.Don

== See also ==
- Taxodiaceae
