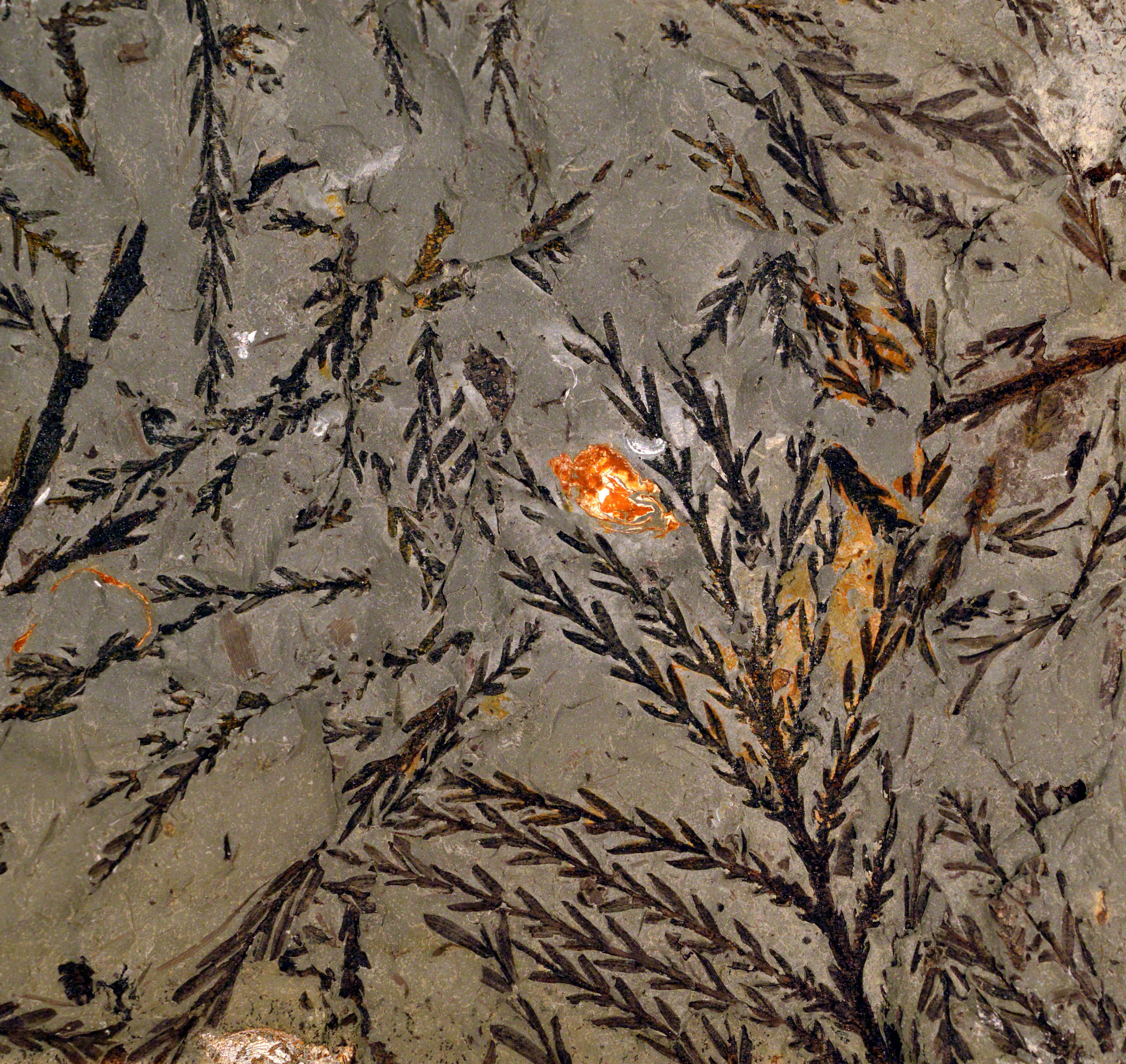
- Glyptostrobus europaeus foliage; late Paleocene, Paskapoo Formation

Scientific classification
- Kingdom: Plantae
- Clade: Tracheophytes
- Clade: Gymnosperms
- Division: Pinophyta
- Class: Pinopsida
- Order: Cupressales
- Family: Cupressaceae
- Genus: Glyptostrobus
- Species: G. europaeus

Binomial name
- Glyptostrobus europaeus (Brongn.) Heer 1855

= Glyptostrobus europaeus =

Glyptostrobus europaeus Temporal range: Aptian–Pleistocene

Extinct species of conifer

Glyptostrobus europaeus is an extinct conifer species of the family Cupressaceae that is found as fossils throughout the Northern Hemisphere. The sole living species of Glyptostrobus (Glyptostrobus pensilis) was described from China in 1926. The name of the genus comes from the Greek "glypto" meaning grooved or carved, and "strobilus" meaning cone. The species name "europaeus" refers to the fact that it was first described from Europe.

== History ==
Fossilized remains of Glyptostrobus were first described as Taxodium europaeus by Adolphe-Théodore Brongniart in 1833 and reassigned to the genus Glyptostrobus by Oswald Heer in 1855. The division of fossil members of the genus into a number of other species is considered by some to rest on "very unreliable criteria". In fact, it has been stated that fossil Glyptostrobus does not appear to differ significantly from the living species and "it is possible that the tree now on the verge of extinction in China is the Tertiary species unchanged".

== Description ==
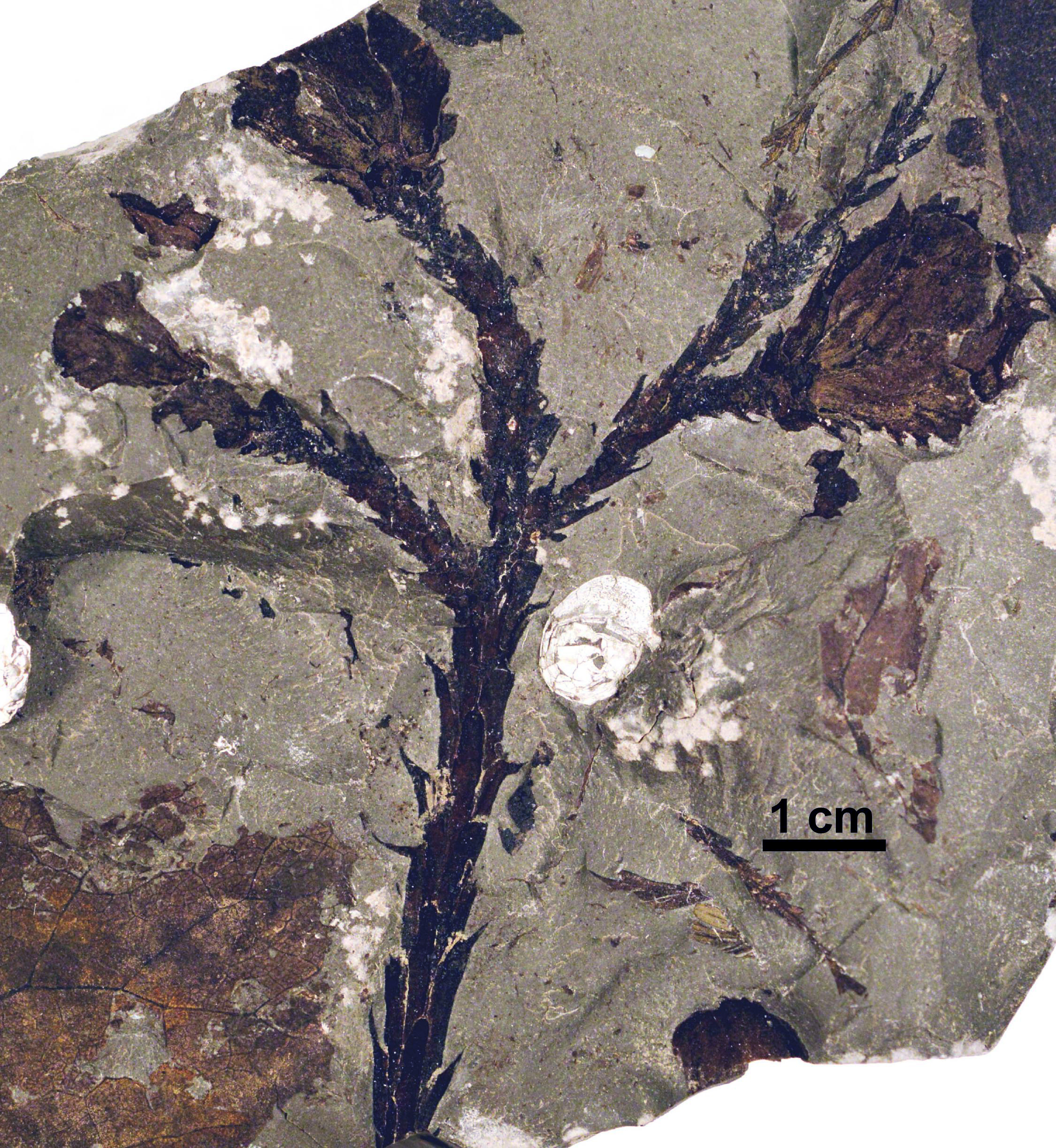
Seed-cones of G. europaeus from the Paskapoo Formation.

Like living Glyptostrobus, G. europaeus was deciduous and shed its branchlets seasonally. It bears three types of leaves, cupressoid (scale-like), cryptomeroid (needle-like), and taxodioid (flat and oblong), as well as two transitional types (crypto-cupressoid and crypto-taxodioid). All are spirally arranged, but some are twisted at the base to lie in two horizontal ranks. The seed-bearing cones are pyriform (pear-shaped) and up to 20 mm long and 10 mm wide. They consist of woody imbricate (overlapping) scales that are roughly triangular in shape, and are borne terminally on short twigs with scale-like leaves. The seeds are up to 13 mm long and 7 mm wide, winged and triangular to hatchet-shaped. The pollen-bearing cones are small and globose, up to 3 mm long and 3 mm wide. They consist of acute-tipped, incurved, imbricate scales and are borne on short, alternately arranged twigs with scale-like leaves.

== Age and distribution ==
Remains of Glyptostrobus are found in sediments of Early Cretaceous (Aptian stage) to Pleistocene age in Europe, Greenland, North America and Asia. Throughout the Tertiary period Glyptostrobus was a major component of northern forests in lowland and swampy areas, where in many places it coexisted with Metasequoia occidentalis.
