= Cypress knee =

Distinctive structure forming above the roots of a cypress tree

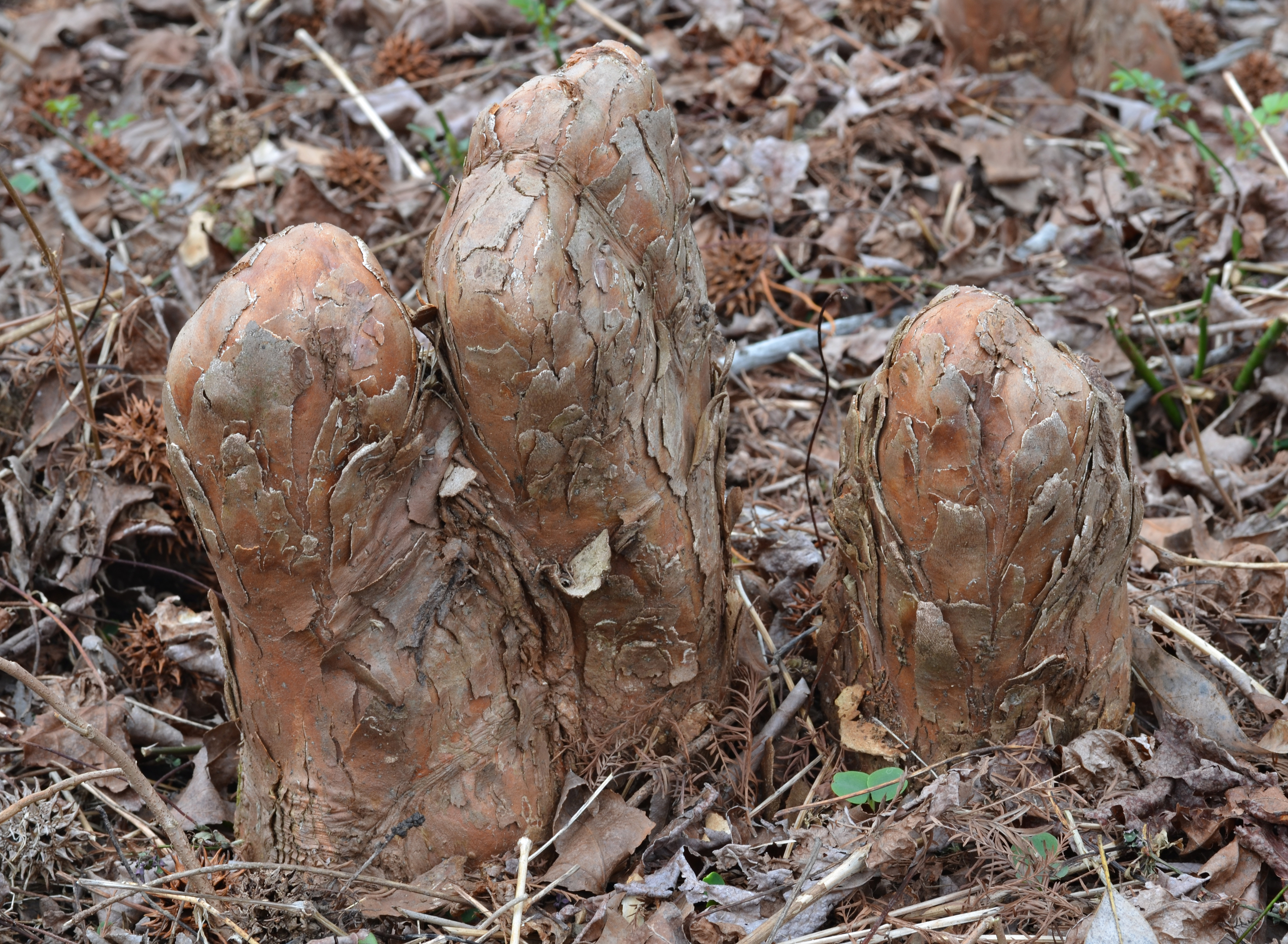
Knees with very little taper

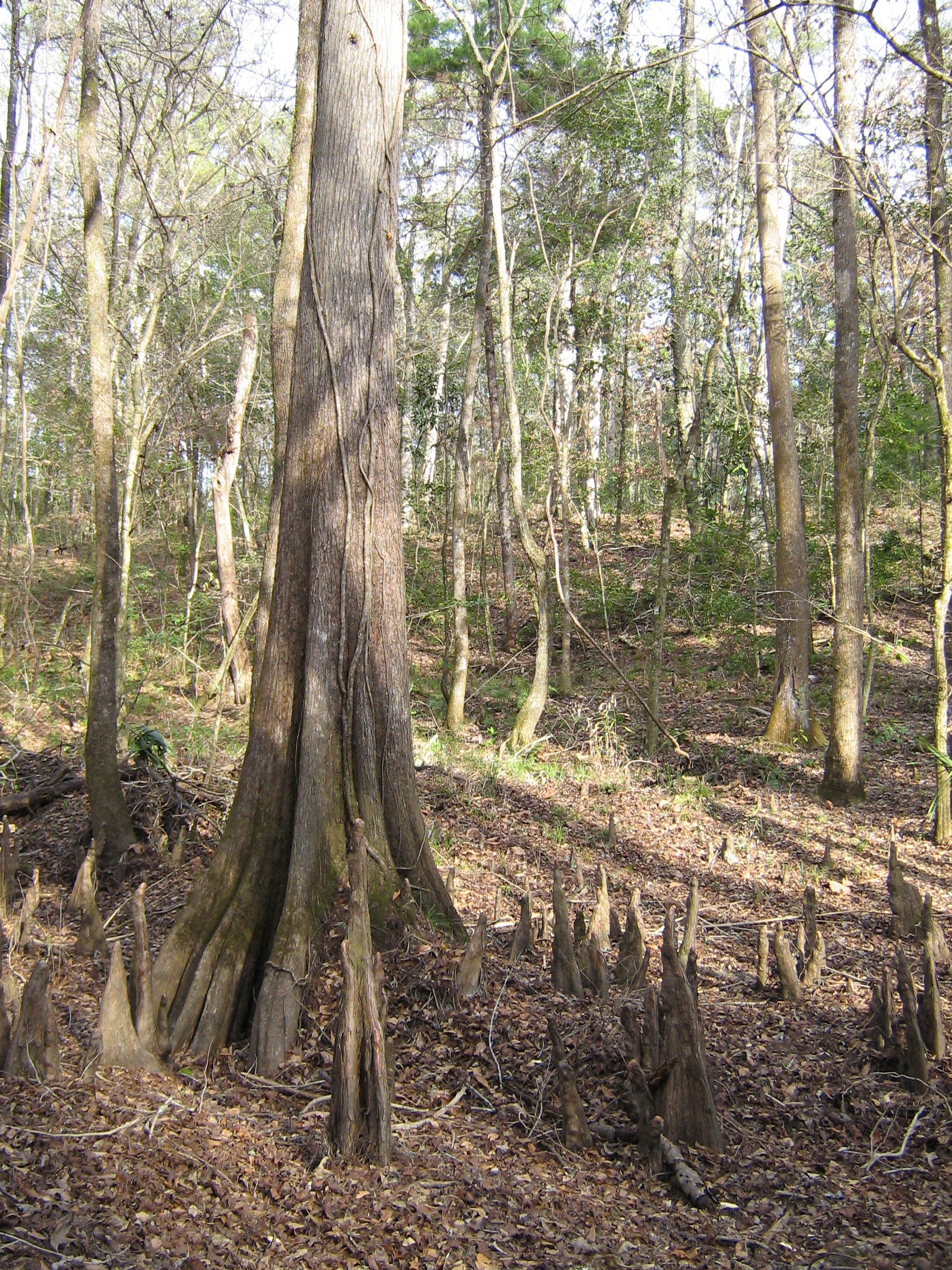
A bald cypress exhibiting tapered knees

A cypress knee is a distinctive structure forming above the roots of cypress trees of some of the species of the subfamily Taxodioideae, such as the bald cypress. They are believed to be a type of aerial root, and are often found in swamps. Cypress knees can grow to considerable size. The largest on record, along the Cache River in northeastern Arkansas, is 3 m (9.8 ft) high and 0.9 m (2 ft 11 in) diameter at water level. The tallest, along the Suwannee River in North Florida, is 4.3 m (14 ft) in height. Some current hypotheses state that they might help to aerate the tree's roots, create a barrier to catch sediment and reduce erosion, assist in anchoring the tree in the soft and muddy soil, or any combination thereof.

Knees are woody projections sent above the normal water level, roughly vertically from the roots, with a near-right-angle bend taking them vertically upward through water. One early assumption of their function was that they provided oxygen to the roots that grow in the low-dissolved-oxygen (DO) waters typical of a swamp, acting as pneumatophores: mangroves have similar adaptations. There is little actual evidence for this assertion; in fact, swamp-dwelling specimens whose knees are removed continue to thrive, and laboratory tests demonstrate that the knees are not effective at depleting oxygen in a sealed chamber. Even though there is no expert consensus on their role, the supposition that they are pneumatophores is repeated without comment in several introductory botany textbooks.

Another more likely function is that of structural buttressed support and stabilization. Lowland or swamp-grown cypresses found in flooded or flood-prone areas tend to be buttressed and "kneed", as opposed to cypresses grown on higher ground, which may grow with very little taper.

Trees that develop these "knees" include:

- Glyptostrobus
  - Glyptostrobus pensilis (Chinese swamp cypress) – produces knees but only rarely.
- Taxodium
  - Taxodium distichum (syn. Taxodium distichum var. distichum; baldcypress) – knees commonly produced.
  - Taxodium ascendens (syn. Taxodium distichum var. imbricarium; pondcypress) – knees commonly produced.
  - Taxodium mucronatum (ahuehuete) – produces knees but only rarely.

Although the genus Cryptomeria (sugi) is in the same subfamily, there are no reports of it producing knees.

Also the unrelated Sonneratia caseolaris (Lythraceae) has knees very similar to those of Taxodium distichum.

== See also ==
- Cypress dome – Swamp dominated by pond or bald cypress
