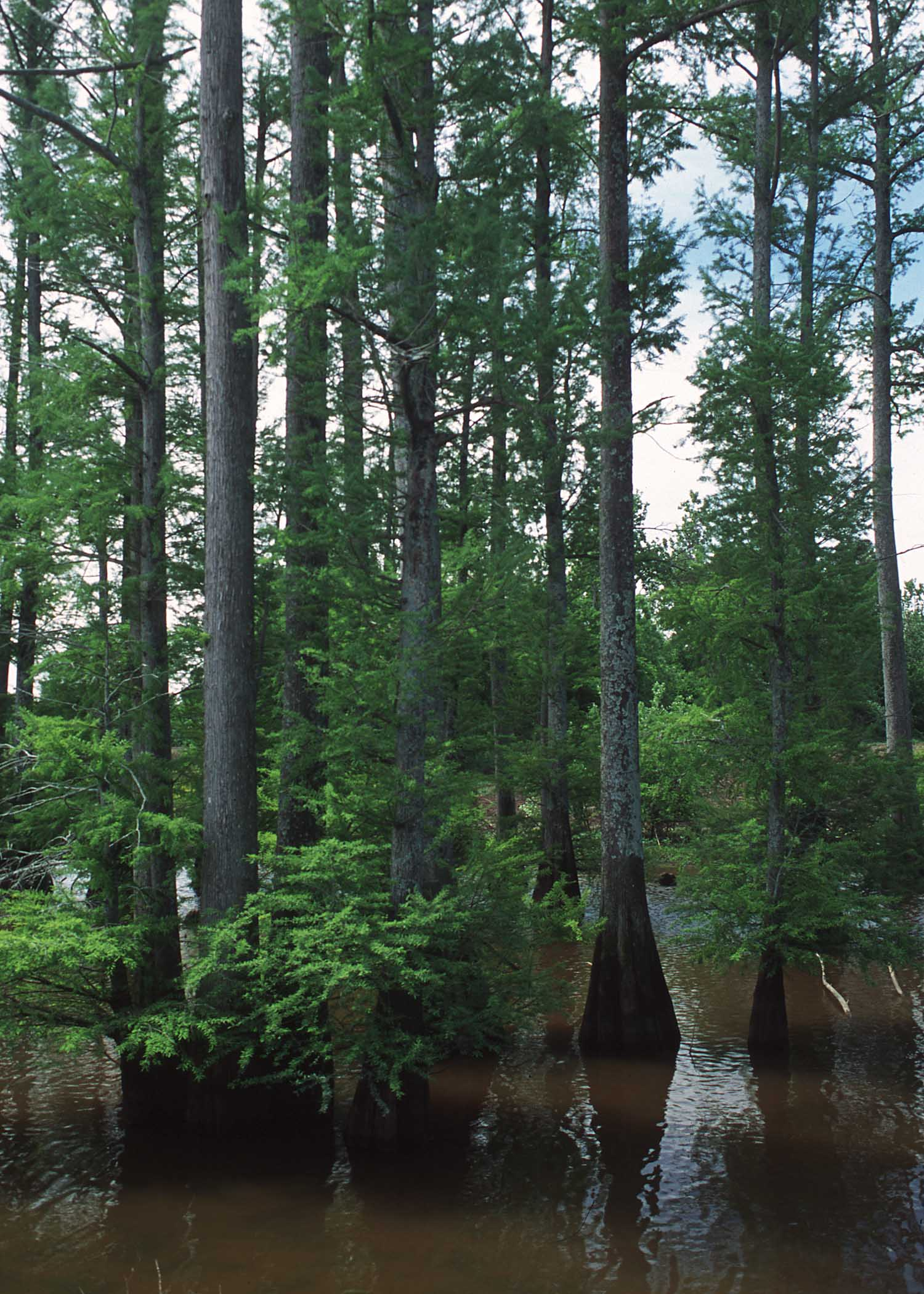
- Bald cypress forest in a central Mississippi lake

Scientific classification
- Kingdom: Plantae
- Clade: Embryophytes
- Clade: Tracheophytes
- Clade: Gymnosperms
- Division: Pinophyta
- Class: Pinopsida
- Order: Cupressales
- Family: Cupressaceae
- Subfamily: Taxodioideae
- Genus: Taxodium; Rich.

Type species
- Taxodium distichum (L.) Rich.

Species
- T. ascendens; T. distichum; †T. dubium; T. mucronatum

Synonyms
- Schubertia de Mirbel 1812 non Mart. 1824 non Blume 1826; Cuprespinnata Nelson

= Taxodium =

Taxodium Temporal range: Late Cretaceous–Present

Genus of conifers

Taxodium /tækˈsoʊdiəm/ is a genus of one to three species (depending on taxonomic opinion) of extremely flood-tolerant conifers in the cypress family, Cupressaceae. The name is derived from the Latin word taxus 'yew' and the Greek word εἶδος (eidos) 'similar to'. Within the family, Taxodium is most closely related to Chinese swamp cypress (Glyptostrobus pensilis) and sugi (Cryptomeria japonica).

Species of Taxodium occur in the southern part of the North American continent and are deciduous in the north and semi-evergreen to evergreen in the south. They are large trees, reaching 100–150 ft (30–46 m) tall and 6.5–10 ft (2–3 m) (exceptionally 36 ft or 11 m) trunk diameter. The needle-like leaves, 0.2–0.8 in (0.5–2 cm) long, are borne spirally on the shoots, twisted at the base so as to appear in two flat rows on either side of the shoot. The cones are globose, 0.8–1.4 in (2–3.5 cm) diameter, with 10–25 scales, each scale with one or two seeds; they are mature in 7–9 months after pollination, when they disintegrate to release the seeds. The male (pollen) cones are produced in pendulous racemes, and shed their pollen in early spring. Taxodium species grow cypress knees, when growing in or beside water. The function of these knees is currently a subject of ongoing research.

== Species ==
The three extant taxa of Taxodium are treated here as distinct species, though some botanists treat them in just one or two species, with the others considered as varieties of the first described. The three are distinct in ecology, growing in different environments, but hybridise where they meet.

Image	Name	Common name	Distribution
	Taxodium ascendens Brongn.	pond cypress	Occurs within the range of bald cypress, but only on the southeastern coastal plain from North Carolina to Louisiana. It occurs in still blackwater rivers, ponds and swamps without silt-rich flood deposits.
	Taxodium distichum (L.) Rich.	bald cypress	Native to much of the southeastern United States, from Delaware to Texas, especially Louisiana and inland up the Mississippi River to southern Indiana. It occurs mainly along rivers with silt-rich flood deposits.
	Taxodium mucronatum Ten.	Montezuma cypress, ahuehuete, sabino	Occurs from the Lower Rio Grande Valley south to the highlands of Guatemala, and differs from the other two species in being substantially evergreen. A specimen in Santa María del Tule, Oaxaca, the Árbol del Tule, is 43 m (141 ft) tall and has the greatest trunk thickness of all trees, 11.42 m (37.5 ft) in diameter. It is a riparian tree, occurring on the banks of streams and rivers, not in swamps like the bald and pond cypresses.

- †Taxodium dubium (Sternb.) Heer

=== Formerly placed here ===
- Glyptostrobus pensilis (Staunton ex D.Don) K.Koch (as T. japonicum var. heterophyllum Brongn.)
- Sequoia sempervirens (D.Don) Endl. (as T. sempervirens D.Don)

== Uses ==
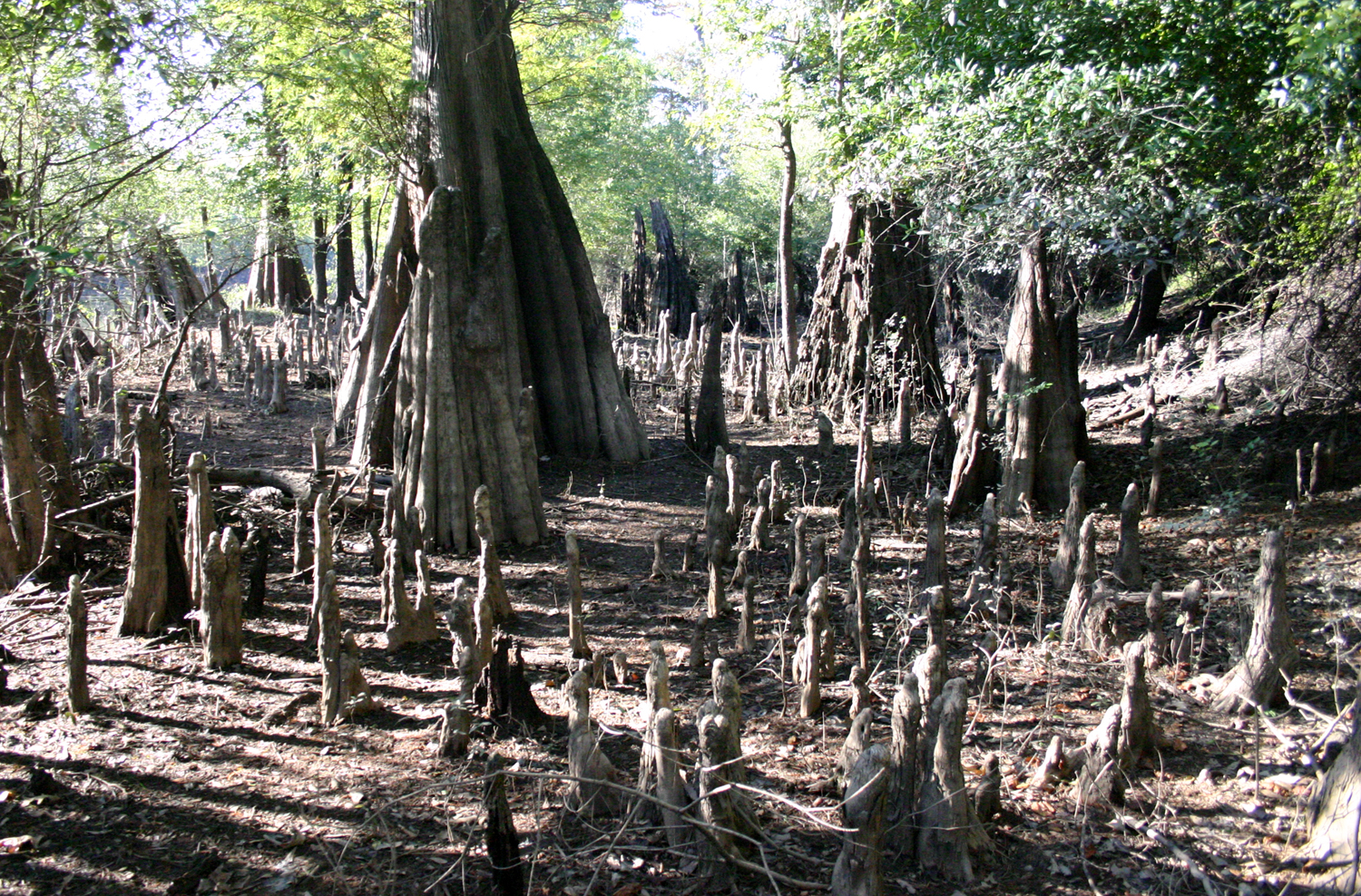
Cypress knees at low water, Wee Tee Lake, South Carolina

The trees are especially prized for their wood, of which the heartwood is extremely rot- and termite-resistant. The heartwood contains a sesquiterpene called cypressene, which acts as a natural preservative. It takes decades for cypressene to accumulate in the wood, so lumber taken from old-growth trees is more rot resistant than that from second-growth trees. However, age also increases susceptibility to Pecky Rot fungus (Stereum taxodii), which attacks the heartwood and causes some damaged trees to become hollow and thus useless for timber. Bald Cypress wood was much used in former days in the southeastern United States for roof shingles. The shredded bark of these trees is used as a mulch.

== Evolution ==
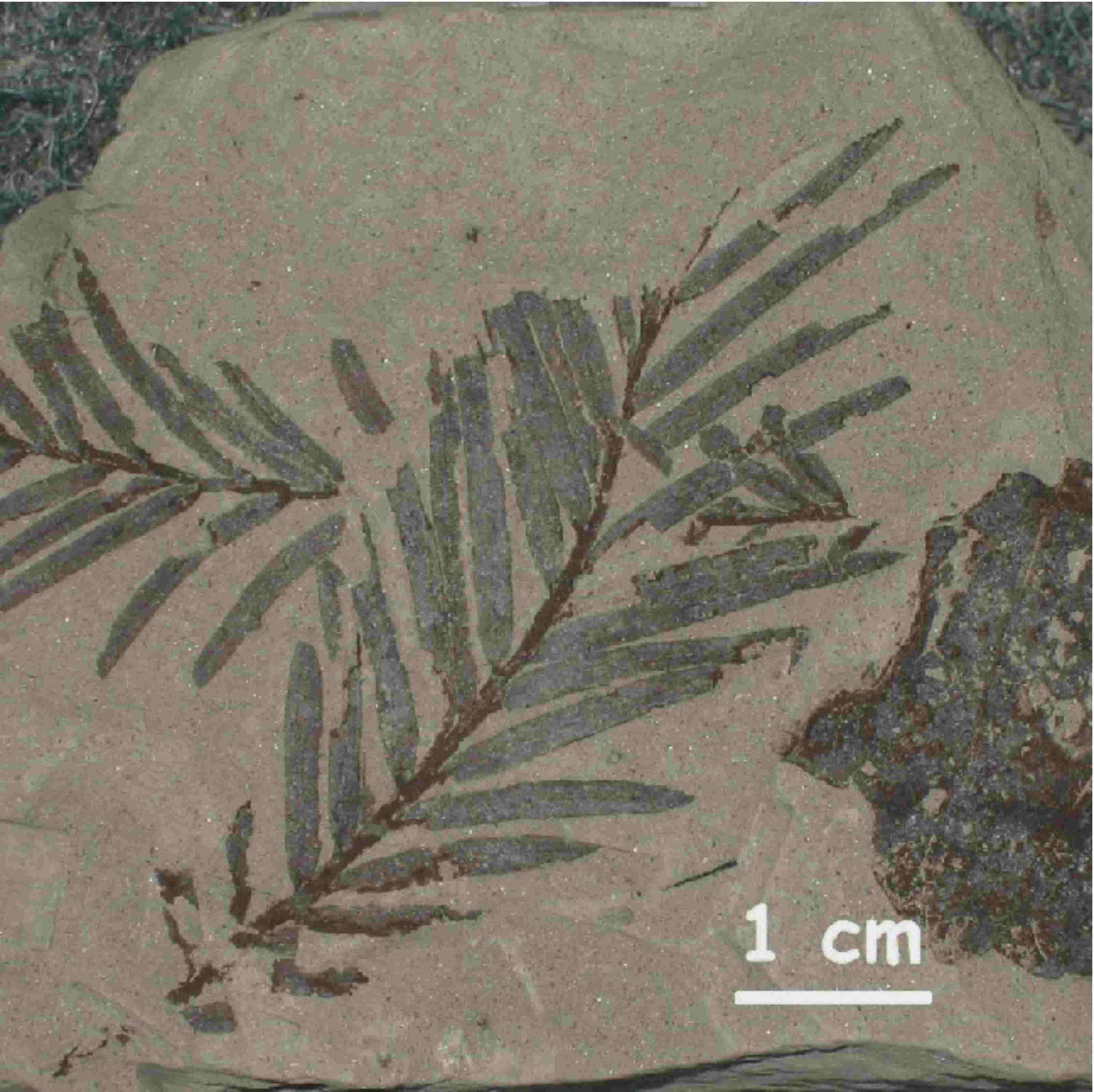
Fossil leaf of Taxodium dubium, 8 Mil. years old, Hambach lignite open pit mine, Germany

In earth's history Taxodium was much more widespread in the Northern Hemisphere than today. The oldest fossils were found in Late Cretaceous deposits from North America and Asia. The trees persisted in Europe until around 2.5 million years ago, during the Pliocene.

== See also ==
- Bükkábrány mummified forest
