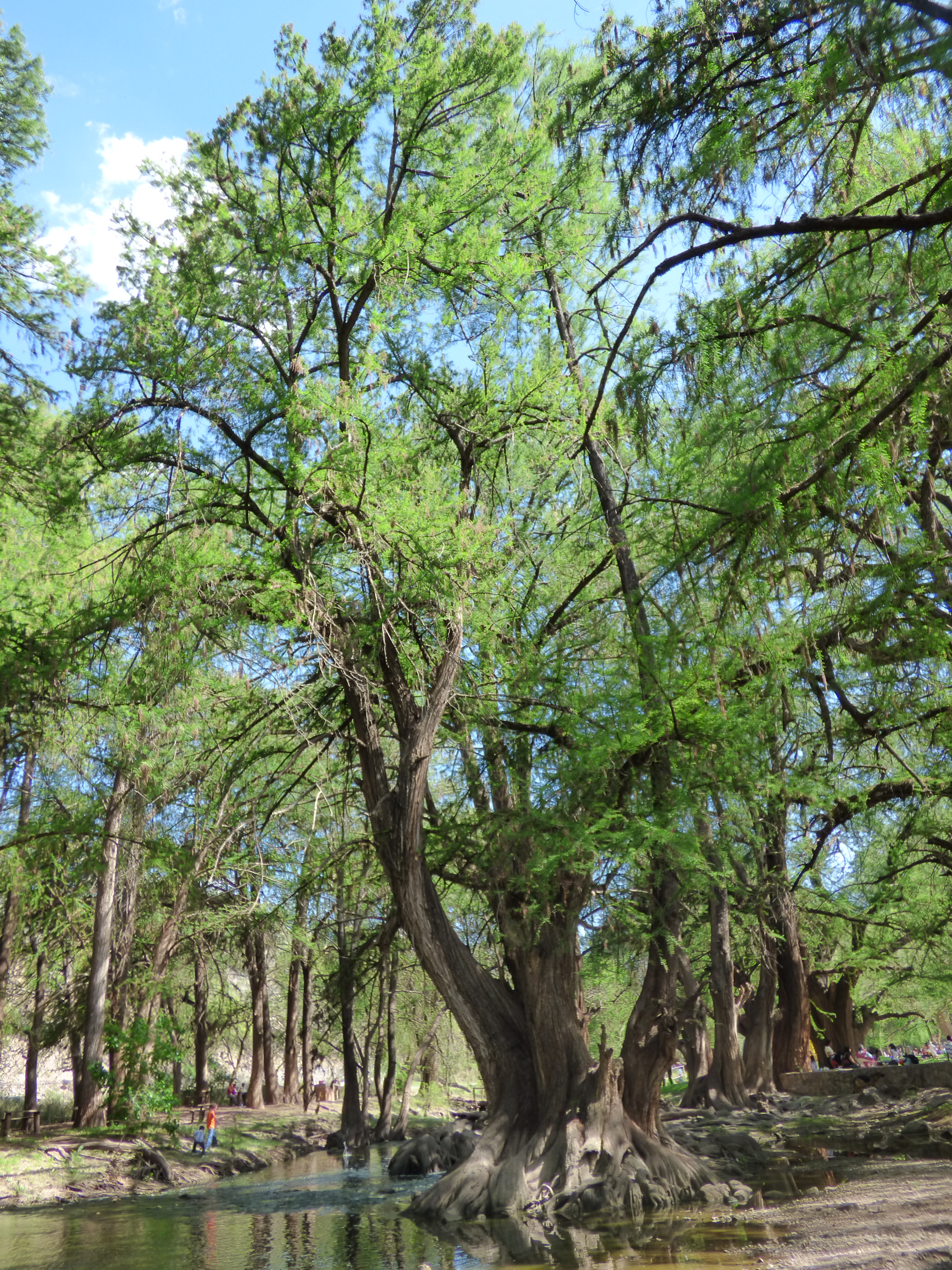
- at El Sabinal, Aguascalientes, Mexico

Conservation status
- Least Concern (IUCN 3.1)

Scientific classification
- Kingdom: Plantae
- Clade: Tracheophytes
- Clade: Gymnosperms
- Division: Pinophyta
- Class: Pinopsida
- Order: Cupressales
- Family: Cupressaceae
- Genus: Taxodium
- Species: T. mucronatum

Binomial name
- Taxodium mucronatum Ten.
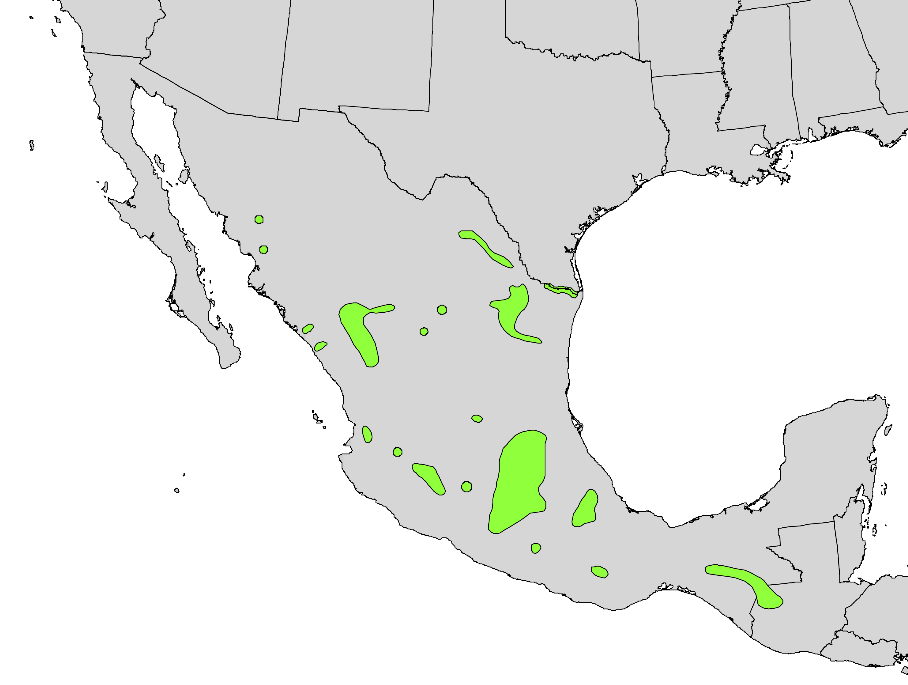
- Natural range

Synonyms
- Taxodium distichum var. mucronatum (Ten.) A.Henry; Taxodium mexicanum Carrière; Taxodium distichum var. mexicanum (Carrière) Gordon; Cuprespinnata mexicana (Carrière) J.Nelson; Taxodium huegelii C.Lawson

= Taxodium mucronatum =

Species of conifer

Taxodium mucronatum, the Montezuma bald cypress, Montezuma cypress, sabino, or ahuehuete, is a coniferous tree in the family Cupressaceae. It is primarily native to Mexico and Guatemala, with a few populations in the southwestern United States. Ahuehuete is derived from the Nahuatl name for the tree, āhuēhuētl, which means 'upright drum in water' or 'old man of the water'.

== Description ==
It is a large evergreen or semi-evergreen coniferous tree growing to 40 m (130 ft) tall and with a trunk of 1–3 m (3.3–9.8 ft) diameter (occasionally much more; see below). The leaves are spirally arranged but twisted at the base to lie in two horizontal ranks, 1–2 cm (0.39–0.79 in) long and 1–2 mm (0.039–0.079 in) broad. The cones are ovoid, 1.5–2.5 cm (0.59–0.98 in) long and 1–2 cm (0.39–0.79 in) broad. Unlike bald cypress and pond cypress, Montezuma cypress rarely produces cypress knees from the roots. Trees from the Mexican highlands achieve a notable stoutness.

One specimen, the Árbol del Tule in Santa María del Tule, Oaxaca, Mexico, is the stoutest tree in the world with a diameter of 11.42 m (37.5 ft). Several other specimens from 3–6 m (9.8–19.7 ft) diameter are known. The second stoutest tree in the world is the Big Baobab, an African baobab.

== Distribution and habitat ==
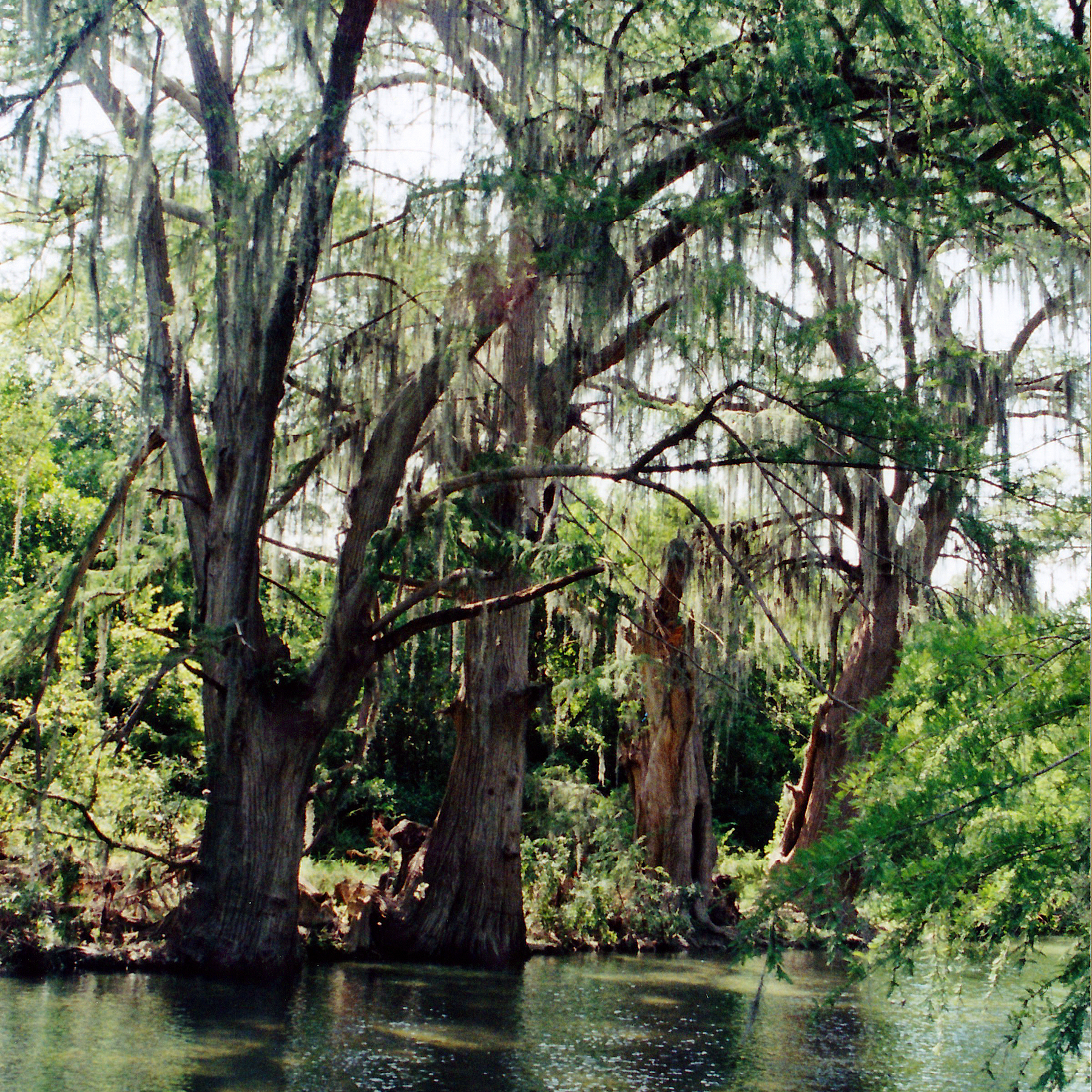
Montezuma bald cypress (Taxodium mucronatum), growing on the Rio Pilón near Villagrán, Municipality of Villagrán, Tamaulipas, Mexico (9 August 2005)

Montezuma cypress is primarily a riparian tree, growing along upland riversides, but can also be found next to springs and marshes. It occurs from 300 to 2,500 m (980 to 8,200 ft), in Mexico mainly in highlands at 1,600–2,300 m (5,200–7,500 ft) in altitude. T. mucronatum is very drought-tolerant and fast-growing and favors climates that are rainy throughout the year or at least with high summer rainfall.

Taxodium mucronatum is native to much of Mexico as far south as the highlands of southern Mexico. Three disjunct populations exist in the United States. One is in southernmost Texas in the Rio Grande Valley, the second is as riparian forest along Texas hill country rivers including the Rio Frio, Sabinal and Guadalupe rivers and another is in southern New Mexico, near Las Cruces. Within Guatemala, the tree is restricted to Huehuetenango Department.

== Culture ==
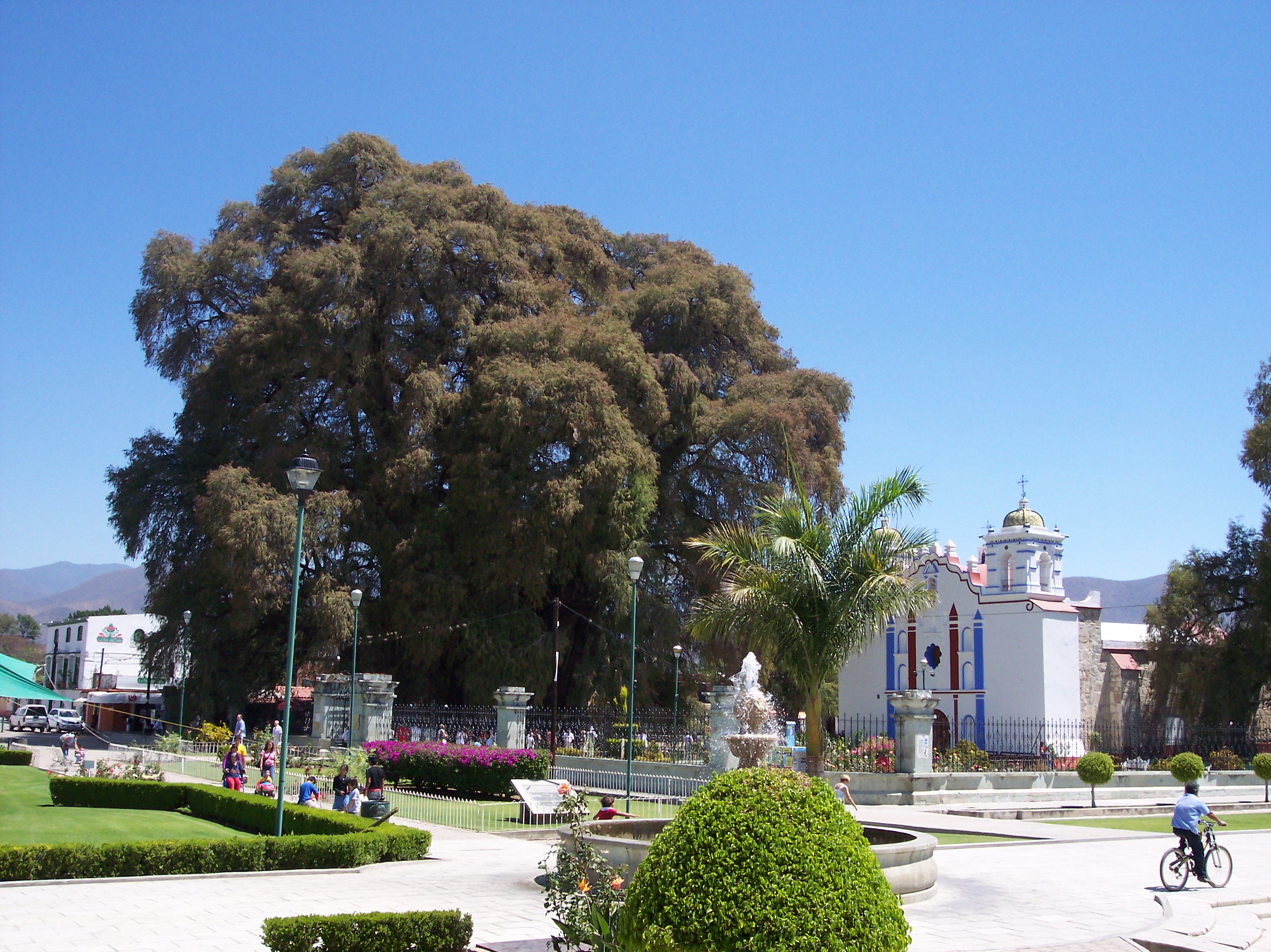
"Árbol del Tule", in Santa María del Tule, Oaxaca, Mexico

The sabino became the national tree of Mexico in 1910. The tree is sacred to the native peoples of Mexico, and is featured in the Zapotec creation myth. To the Aztecs, the combined shade of an āhuēhuētl and a pōchōtl (Ceiba pentandra) metaphorically represented a ruler's authority. According to legend, Hernán Cortés wept under an ahuehuete in Popotla after suffering defeat during the Battle of La Noche Triste.

This plant is mentioned in the 2015 short story "Rivers" by John Keene, which reimagines the story of Mark Twain's Adventures of Huckleberry Finn.

== Uses ==
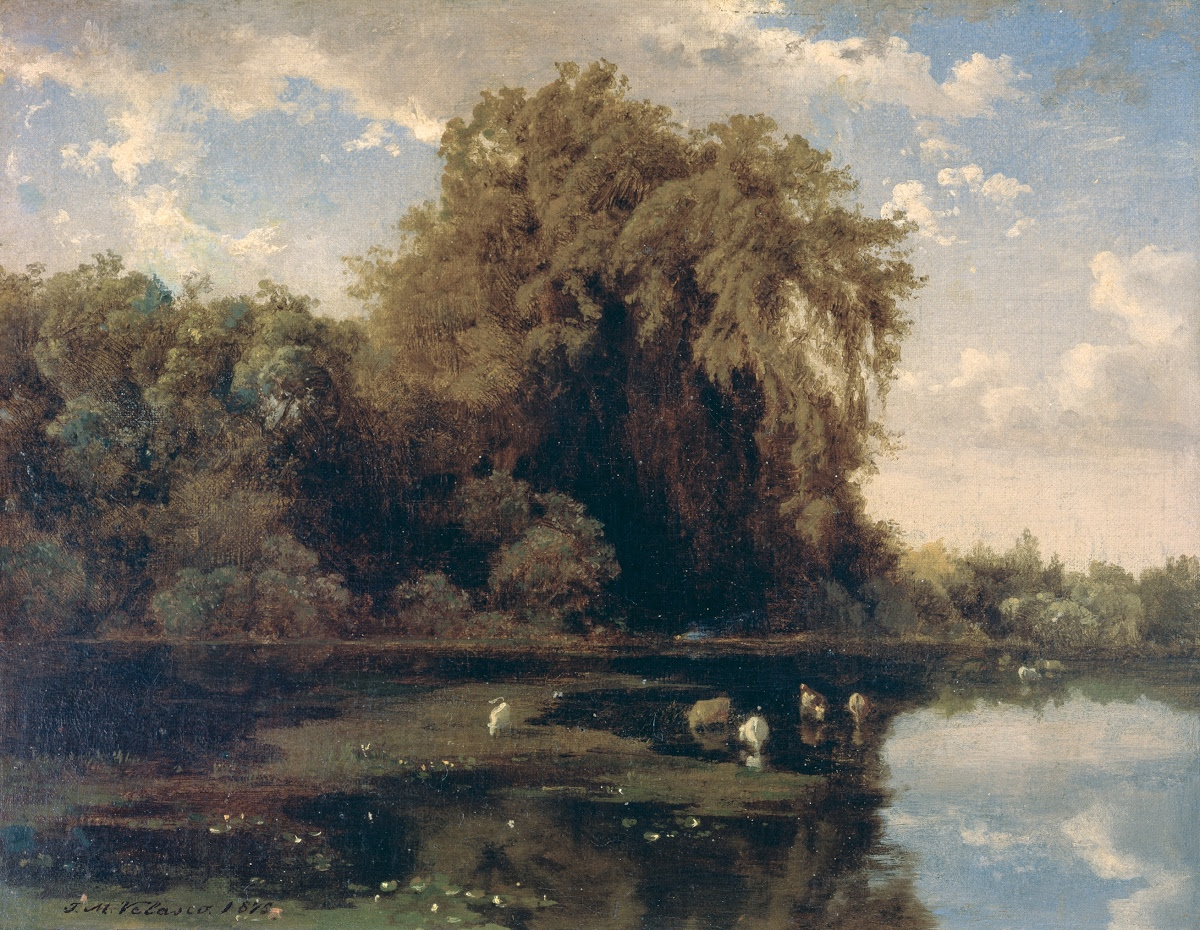
An 1875 painting, Ahuehuetes en Chapultepec, by José María Velasco Gómez depicting the cypress by the lake in Chapultepec.

Montezuma cypresses have been used as ornamental trees since Pre-Columbian times. The Aztecs planted āhuēhuētl along processional paths in the gardens of Chapultepec because of its association with government. Artificial islands called chinampas were formed in the shallow lakes of the Valley of Mexico by adding soil to rectangular areas enclosed by trees such as āhuēhuētl; they also lined the region's canals prior to Spanish conquest.

Ahuehuetes are frequently cultivated in Mexican parks and gardens. The wood is used to make house beams and furniture,. The Aztecs used its resin to treat gout, ulcers, skin diseases, wounds, and toothaches. A decoction made from the bark was used as a diuretic and an emmenagogue. Pitch derived from the wood was used as a cure for bronchitis The leaves acted as a relaxant and could help reduce itching. In some parts of Mexico the foliage is used to decorate church altars during religious ceremonies.

John Naka, a bonsai master, donated his very first bonsai, a Montezuma cypress, to the National Bonsai and Penjing Museum of the United States.

A linear grove is located in the main courtyard of the Getty Center Art Museum, thriving since 1995.

== Hybrids ==
- Taxodium × 'LaNana' (T. distichum × T. mucronatum)
- Taxodium 'Zhongshansa' (T. distichum × T. mucronatum)

== General references ==
- Eguiluz T. 1982. Clima y Distribución del género pinus en México. Distrito Federal. Mexico.
- Rzedowski J. 1983. Vegetación de México. Distrito Federal, Mexico.
- Martínez, Maximinio. 1978. Catálogo de nombres vulgares y científicos de plantas mexicanas.
