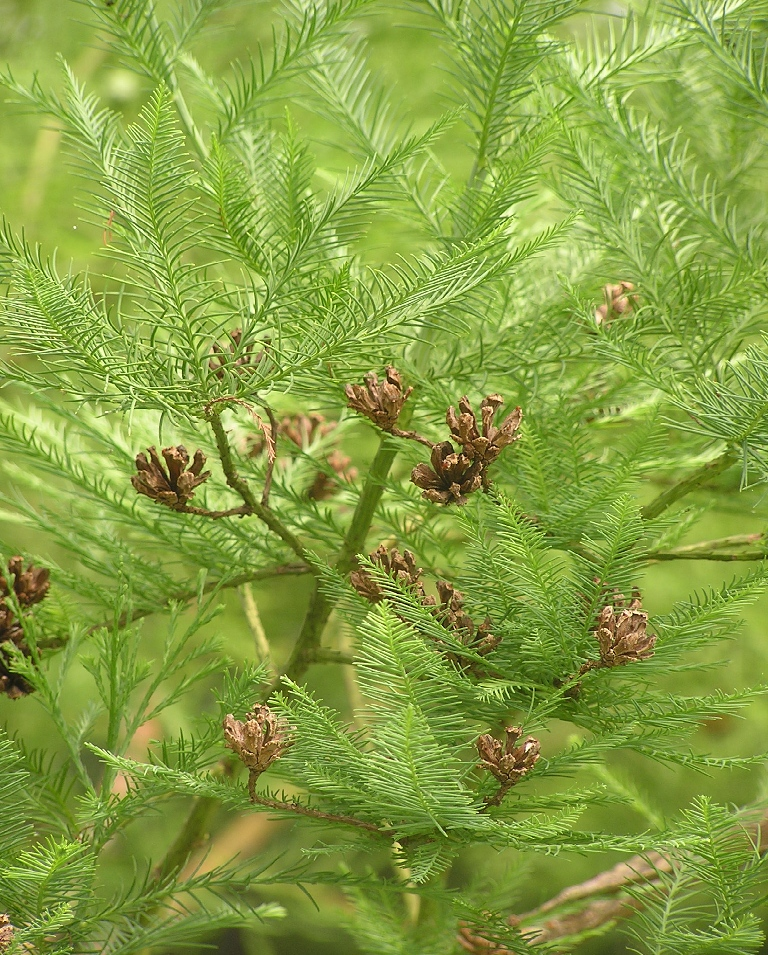
- Glyptostrobus pensilis

Scientific classification
- Kingdom: Plantae
- Clade: Tracheophytes
- Clade: Gymnosperms
- Division: Pinophyta
- Class: Pinopsida
- Order: Cupressales
- Family: Cupressaceae
- Subfamily: Taxodioideae
- Genus: Glyptostrobus; Endl.

Type species
- Glyptostrobus heterophyllus (Brongn.) Endl.

Species
- †G. europaeus; †G. nordenskioldii; G. pensilis

= Glyptostrobus =

Glyptostrobus Temporal range: Late Cretaceous–Recent

Genus of conifers

Glyptostrobus is a small genus of conifers in the family Cupressaceae (formerly in the family Taxodiaceae). The sole living species, Glyptostrobus pensilis, is native to subtropical southeastern China, from Fujian west to southeast Yunnan, and also very locally in northern Vietnam and Bolikhamsai province of eastern Laos near the Vietnam border. The name Glyptostrobus comes from Greek, meaning ‘carved cone’.

== Fossil record ==
The genus formerly had a much wider range, covering most of the Northern Hemisphere, including the high Arctic in the Paleocene and Eocene. The oldest known fossils are late Cretaceous in age, found in North America. It contributed greatly to the coal swamps of the Cenozoic era. It was reduced to its current range before and during the Pleistocene ice ages.

== Description ==
G. pensilis is a medium-sized to large tree, reaching 30 m (98 ft) tall and with a trunk diameter of up to 1 m (3.3 ft), possibly more. The leaves are deciduous, spirally arranged but twisted at the base to lie in two horizontal ranks, 5–20 mm (0.20–0.79 in) long and 1–2 mm (0.039–0.079 in) broad, but 2–3 mm (0.079–0.118 in) long and scale-like on shoots in the upper crown. The cones are green maturing yellow-brown, pear-shaped, 2–3 cm (0.79–1.18 in) long and 1–1.5 cm (0.39–0.59 in) diameter, broadest near the apex. The cones are formed of a cluster of closely fitting and faceted scales that are attached to a squat rachis at their bases. They open when mature to release the small, 5–20 mm (0.20–0.79 in) long, winged seeds.

== Habitat ==
It typically grows in river banks, ponds and swamps, growing in water up to 60 cm (24 in) deep. Like the related genus Taxodium, it produces 'cypress knees' when growing in water, thought to help transport oxygen to the roots.

== Conservation ==
The species is nearly extinct in the wild due to overcutting for its valuable decay-resistant, scented wood, but it is also fairly widely planted along the banks of rice paddies where its roots help to stabilise the banks by reducing soil erosion.

Near Nanhua Temple in Shaoguan, Guangdong Province, researchers have located a remnant population of G. pensilis that has collapsed to just nine ancient trees, some dating from the Ming Dynasty. However, there are no juvenile trees present nearby, meaning the trees have failed to reproduce. Of the remaining trees, few appeared healthy, and no cones or seeds were observed on any individual.
