= Árbol del Tule =

Montezuma cypress in Oaxaca, Mexico; stoutest known tree trunk in the world

Tule
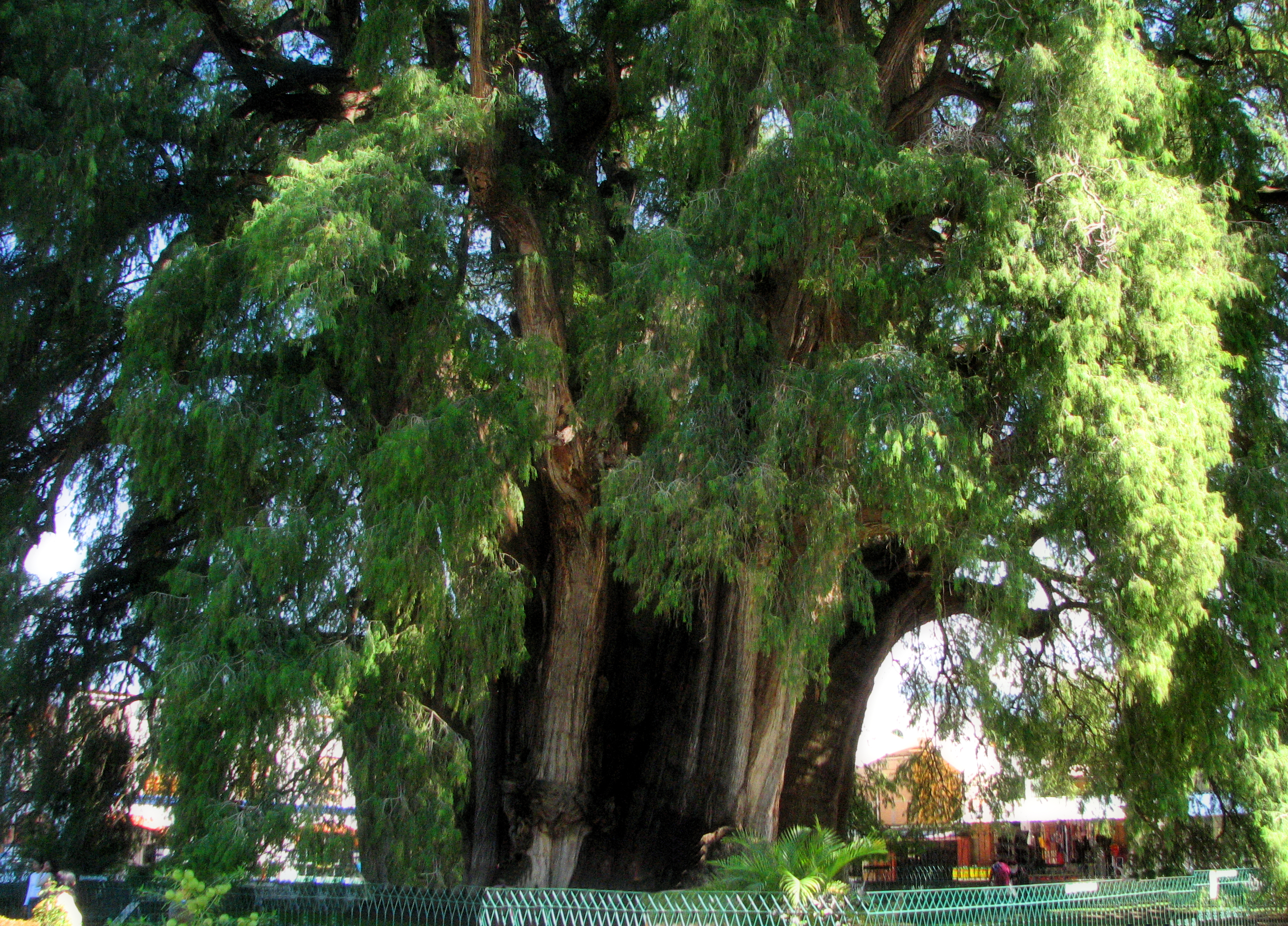
- Full width of trunk

- Location within Mexico
- Species: Montezuma cypress (Taxodium mucronatum)
- Location: Tule, Oaxaca, Mexico
- Coordinates: 17°02′47.4″N 96°38′10″W
- Girth: 42.0 m (137.8 ft)
- Date seeded: 400; 1626 years ago – 600; 1426 years ago

El Árbol del Tule (Spanish for The Tree of Tule) is a tree located in the church grounds in the town center of Santa María del Tule in the Mexican state of Oaxaca, approximately 9 km (6 mi) east of the city of Oaxaca on the road to Mitla. It is a Montezuma cypress (Taxodium mucronatum), or ahuehuete (meaning "old man of the water" in Nahuatl). It has the stoutest tree trunk in the world. In 2001, it was placed on a UNESCO tentative list of World Heritage Sites, but was removed from the list in 2013.

== Dimensions and age ==
In 2005, its trunk had a circumference of 42.0 m (137.8 ft), equating to a diameter of 14.05 m (46.1 ft), an increase from a measurement of 11.42 m (37.5 ft) m in 1982. However, the trunk is heavily buttressed, giving a higher diameter reading than the true cross-sectional of the trunk represents; when this is taken into account, the diameter of the 'smoothed out' trunk is 9.38 m (30.8 ft). This is slightly wider than the next most stout tree known, a giant sequoia with a 8.90 m (29.2 ft) diameter.

The height is difficult to measure due to the very broad crown; the 2005 measurement, made by laser, is 35.4 m (116 ft), shorter than previous measurements of 41–43 m (135–141 ft).

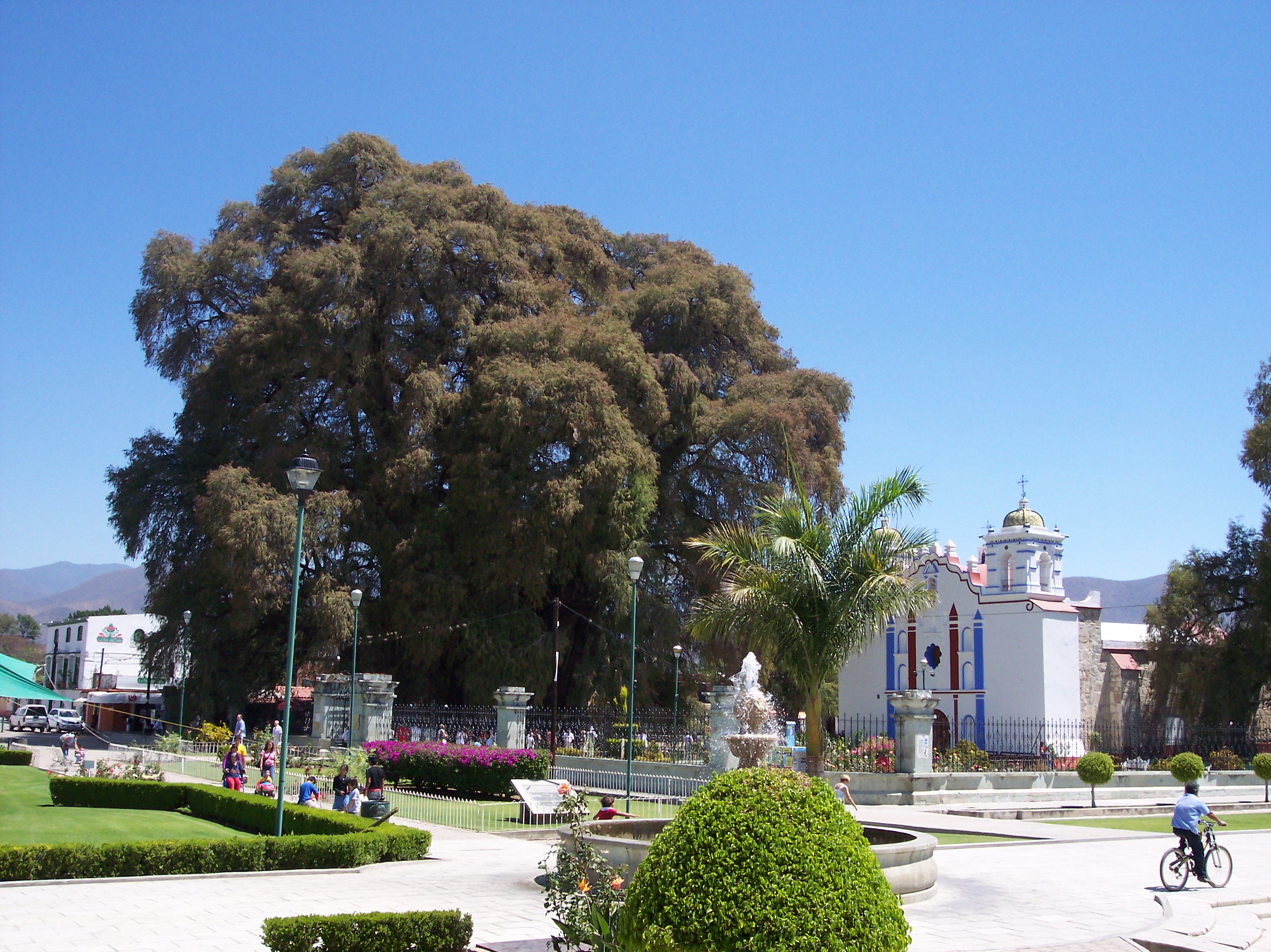
Full view of the Árbol del Tule

It is so large that it was originally thought to be multiple trees, but DNA tests have proven that it is only one tree. This does not rule out another hypothesis, which states that it comprises multiple trunks from a single individual.

The age is unknown, with estimates ranging between 1,200 and 3,000 years, and even one claim of 6,000 years; the best scientific estimate based on growth rates is 1,433–1,600 years. Local Zapotec knowledge holds that it was planted about 1,400 years ago by Pechocha, a priest of the Aztec wind god Ehecatl – this age is in broad agreement with the scientific estimate; its location on a sacred site (later taken over by the Roman Catholic Church) would also support this.

In 1990, it was reported that the tree is slowly dying because its roots have been damaged by water shortages, pollution, and traffic, with 8,000 cars travelling daily on a nearby highway.

== See also ==
- List of individual trees
- List of oldest trees
