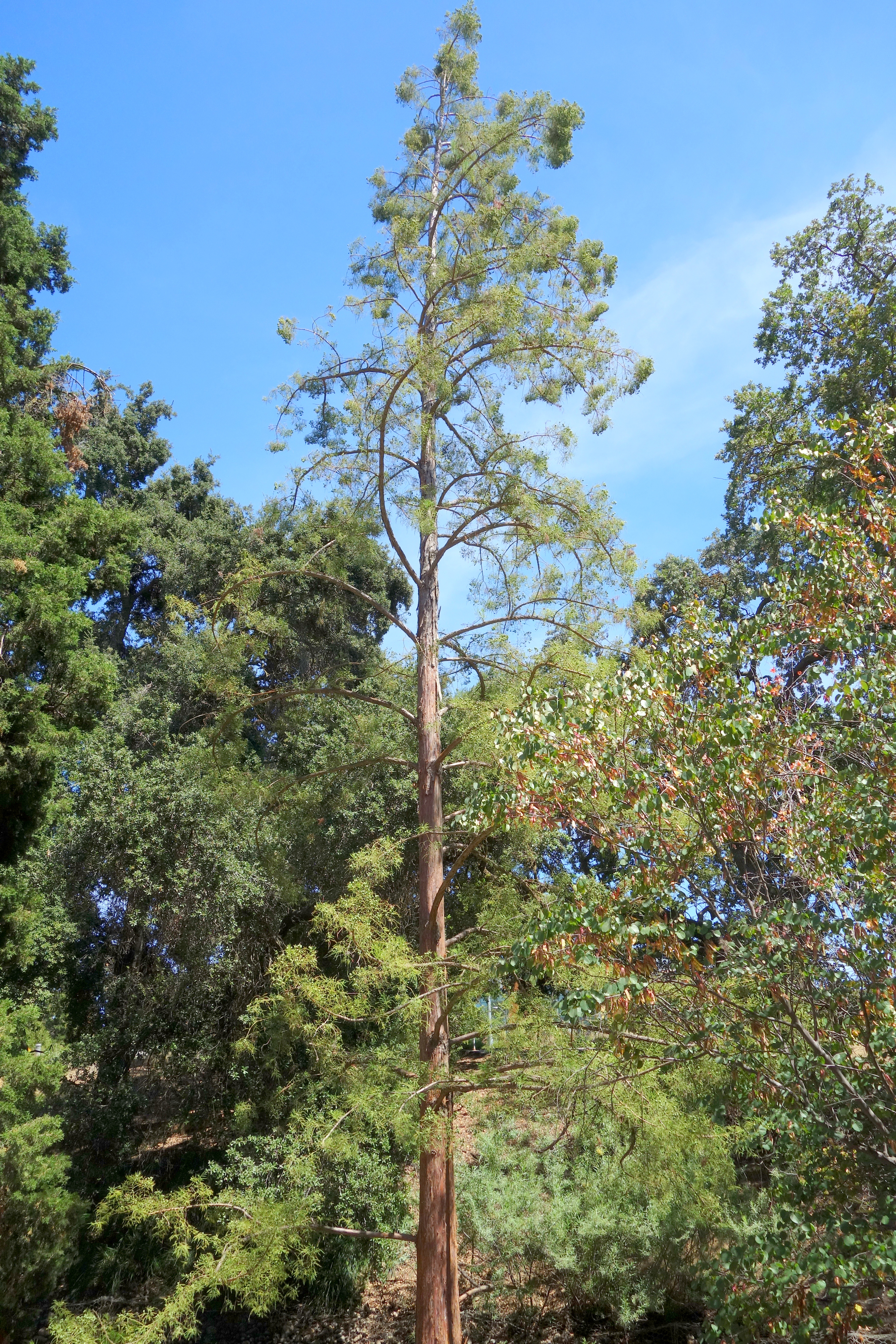

Conservation status
- Critically Endangered (IUCN 3.1)

Scientific classification
- Kingdom: Plantae
- Clade: Tracheophytes
- Clade: Gymnosperms
- Division: Pinophyta
- Class: Pinopsida
- Order: Cupressales
- Family: Cupressaceae
- Genus: Glyptostrobus
- Species: G. pensilis

Binomial name
- Glyptostrobus pensilis (Staunton ex D.Don) K.Koch, 1873

= Glyptostrobus pensilis =

Species of conifer

Glyptostrobus pensilis, known in Chinese as 水松 (Shuǐ sōng), and also Chinese swamp cypress, is an endangered conifer in the cypress family, Cupressaceae, and the sole living species in the genus Glyptostrobus.

== Description ==
It is a medium-sized to large tree, reaching 30 m (98 ft) tall and with a trunk diameter of up to 1 m (3.3 ft), possibly more. The leaves are deciduous, spirally arranged but twisted at the base to lie in two horizontal ranks, 5–20 mm (0.20–0.79 in) long and 1–2 mm (0.039–0.079 in) broad, but 2–3 mm (0.079–0.118 in) long and scale-like on shoots in the upper crown. The cones are green maturing yellow-brown, pear-shaped, 2–3 cm (0.79–1.18 in) long and 1–1.5 cm (0.39–0.59 in) diameter, broadest near the apex. They open when mature to release the small, 5–20 mm (0.20–0.79 in) long, winged seeds. Like the related genus Taxodium, it produces 'cypress knees', or pneumatophores, when growing in water, thought to help transport oxygen to the roots.

== Distribution and habitat ==
G. pensilis is native to subtropical southeastern China, from Fujian west to southeast Yunnan, and also very locally in Central Vietnam and down to central Laos, where stands exist in the Nakai-Nam Theun area. It typically grows in river banks, ponds and swamps, growing in water up to 60 cm (24 in) deep.

== Conservation ==
The species is nearly extinct in the wild due to overcutting for its valuable decay-resistant, scented wood, but it is also fairly widely planted along the banks of rice paddies where its roots help to stabilise the banks by reducing soil erosion. A large population of the species in the Pearl River delta was apparently destroyed during the siege of Panyu in 111 BCE, and there appear to be no remaining wild plants in China. Few of those in Vietnam are seed-bearing. A population of Chinese swamp cypress was recently discovered in central Laos. The species is found in several botanical gardens around the world. It was previously reported that there were four specimens of this tree growing in Bank Hall Gardens, Lancashire, United Kingdom, but it has now been confirmed that they are in fact the swamp or bald cypress from the southeastern USA, Taxodium distichum.

== Remarkable specimens ==
The largest known cultivated tree is located at the Christchurch Botanic gardens in New Zealand. The tree measures 25.20 m (82.67 ft) tall, 12.3 m (40.3 ft) wide and 3.21 m (10.53 ft) in girth.

== Gallery ==
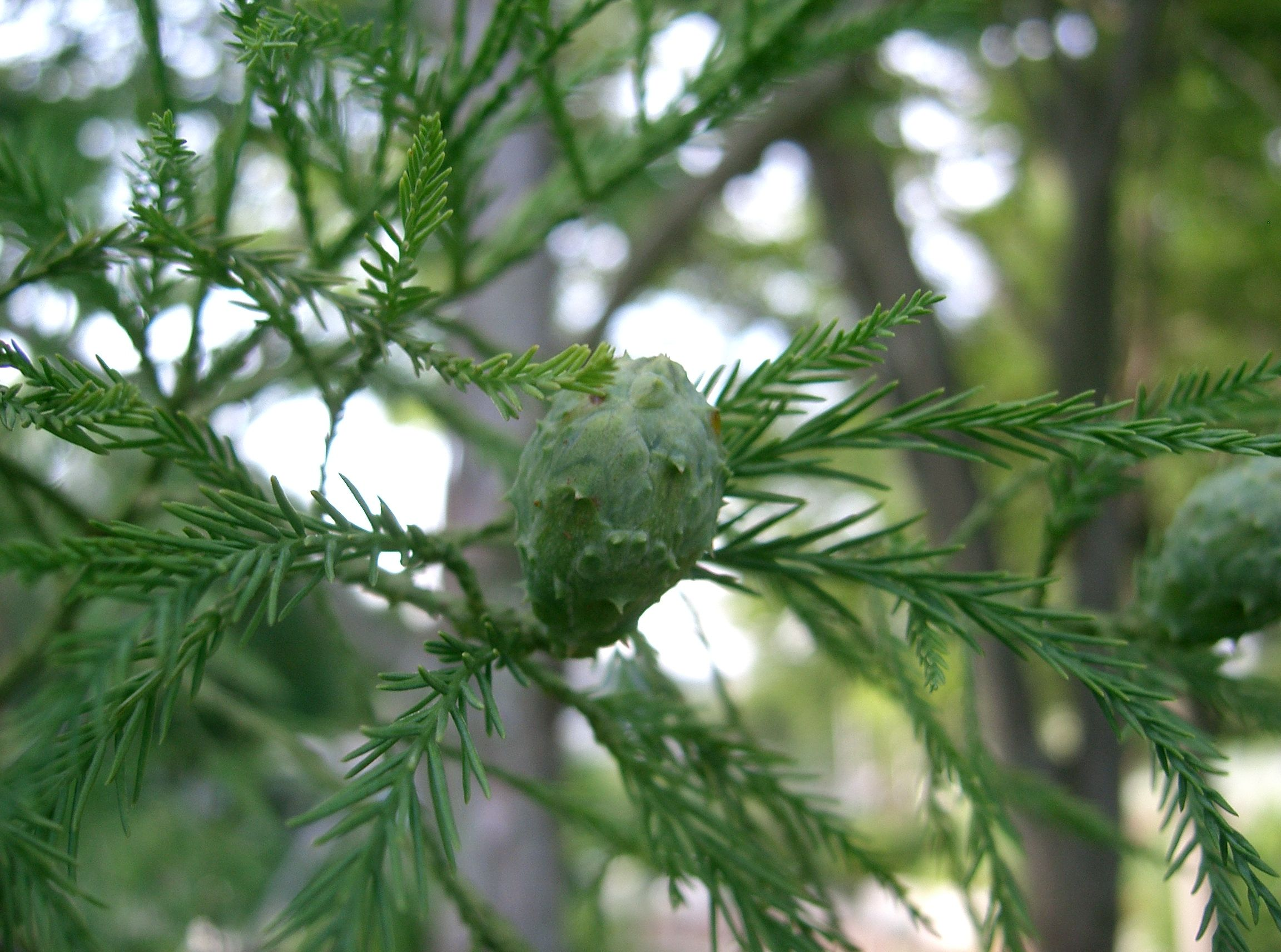
Unripe cone

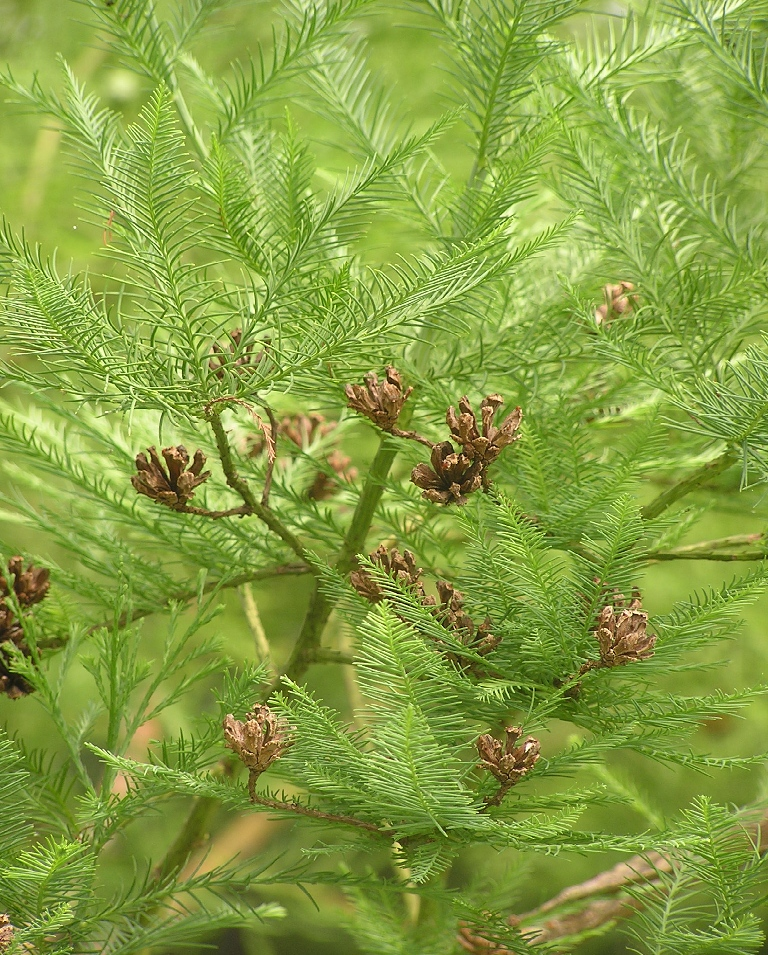
Ripe cones

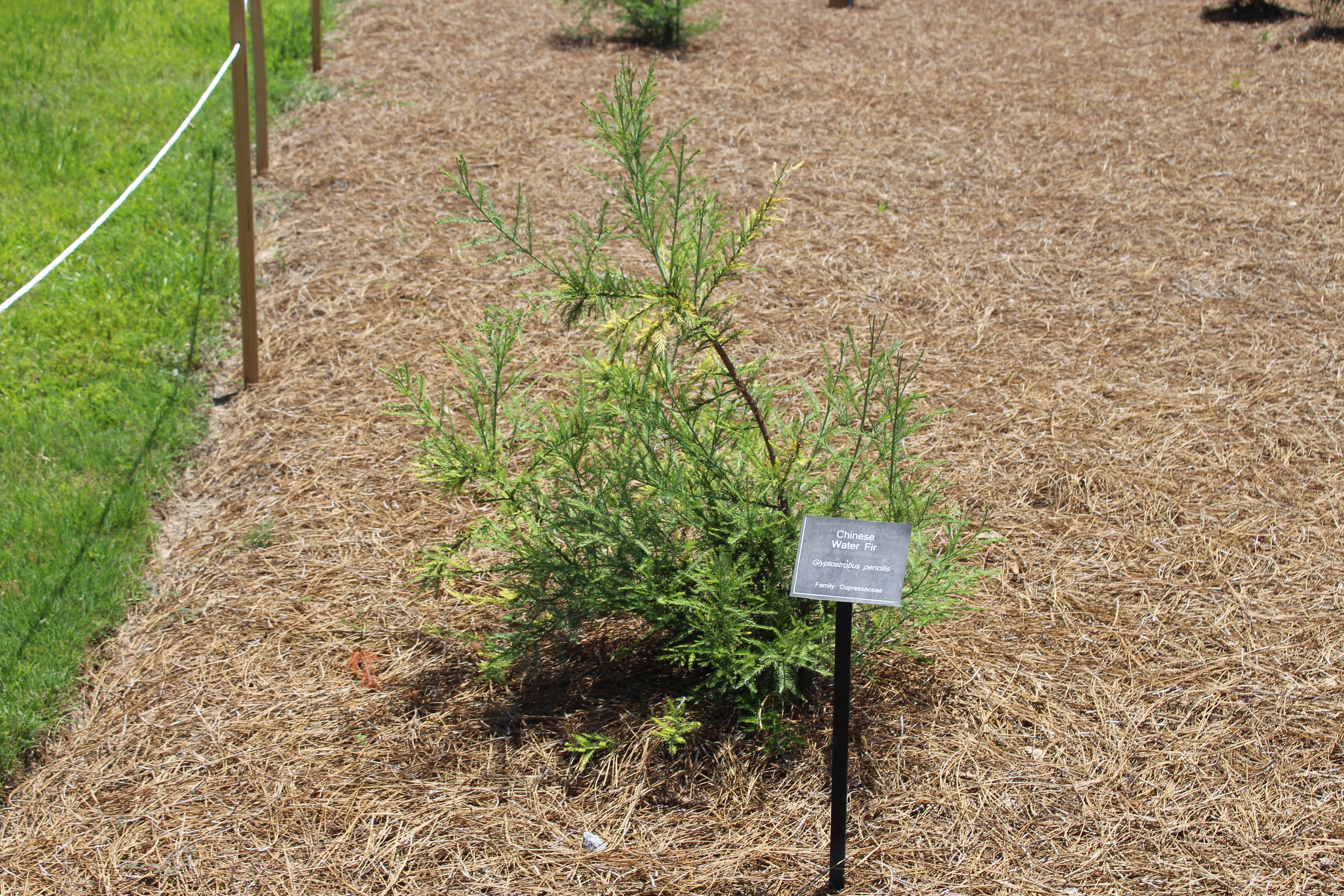
Seedling in the Coastal Georgia Botanical Gardens, US

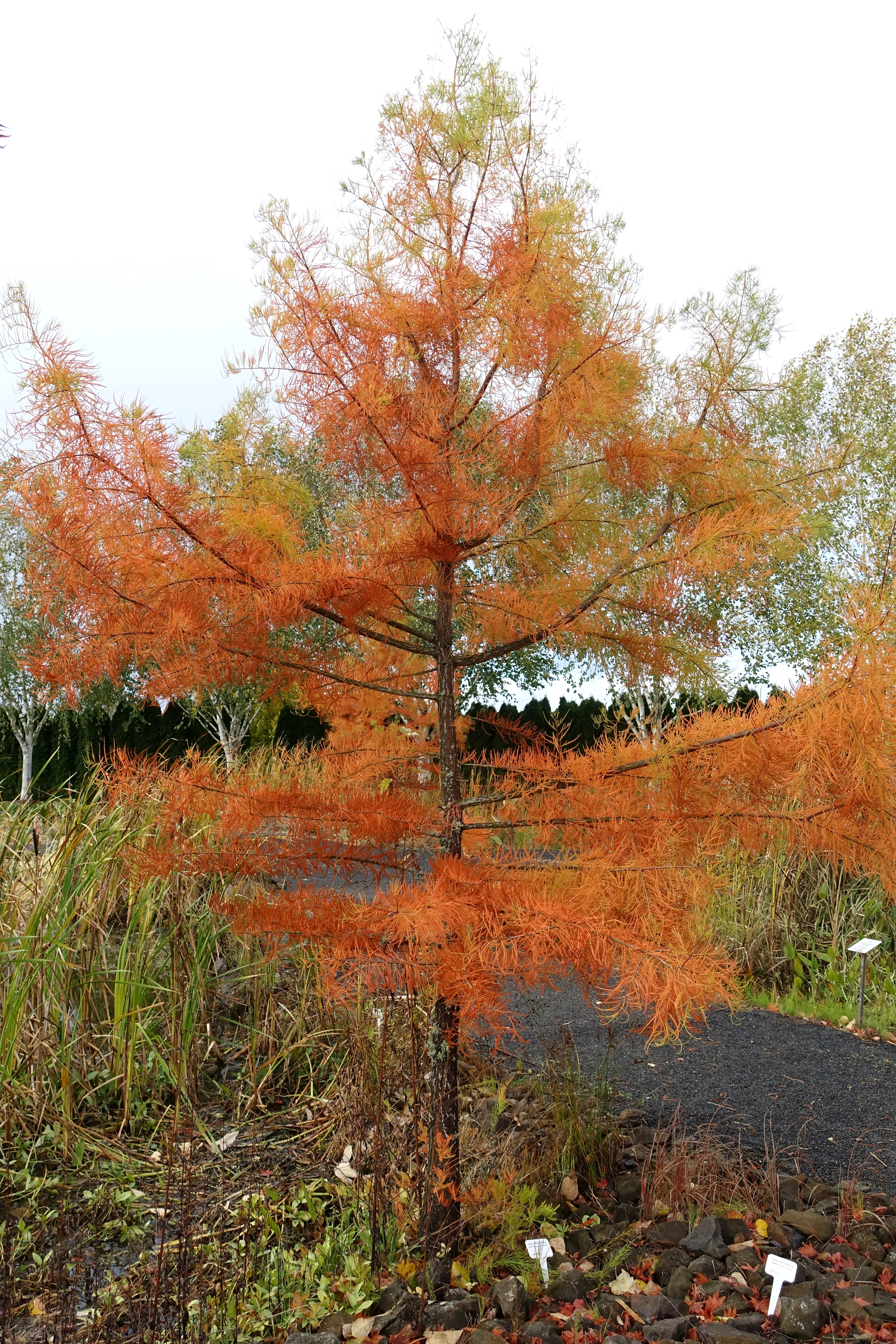
Young tree in the Oregon Garden in autumn; it is deciduous

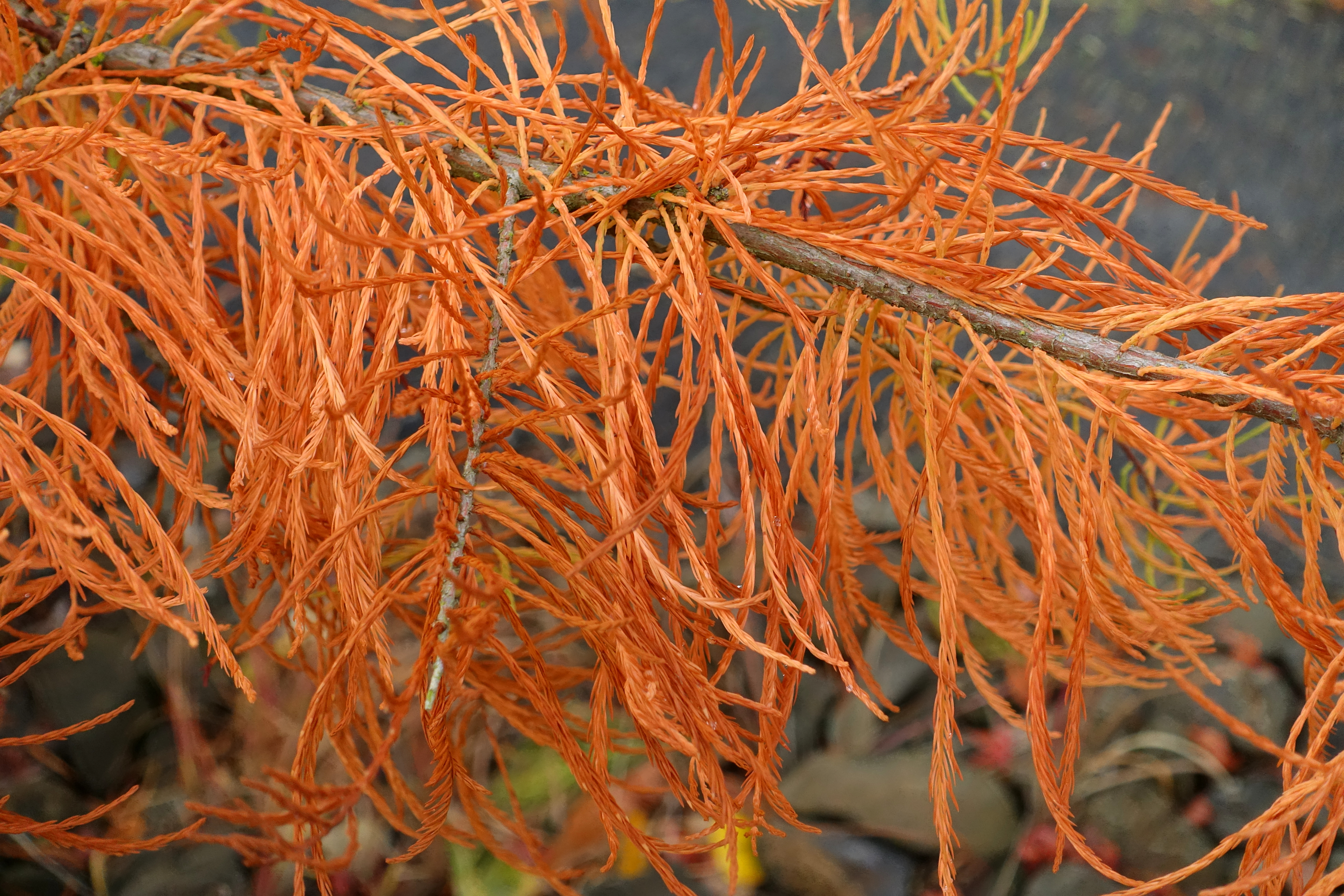
Close-up of autumn foliage

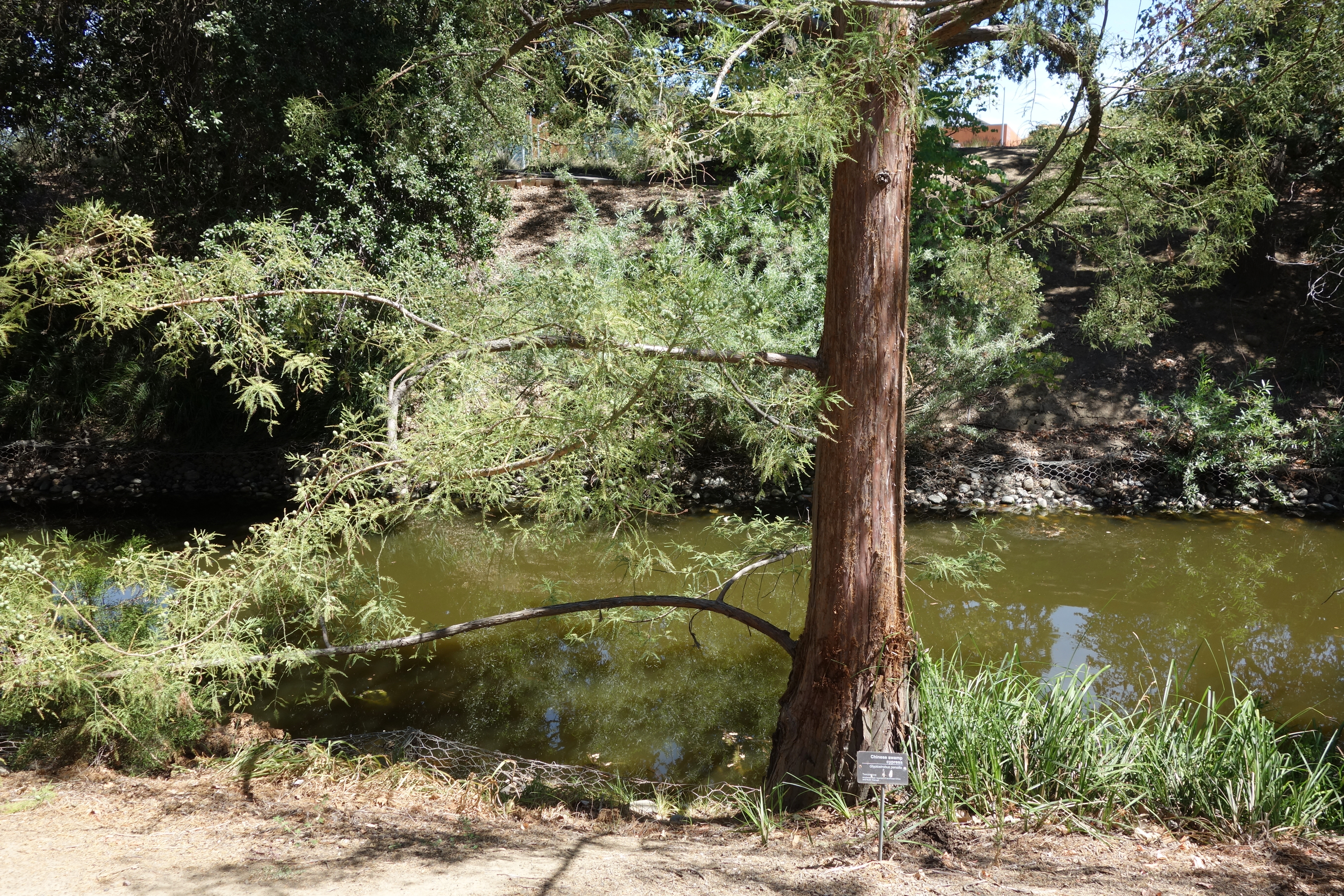
A wet environment

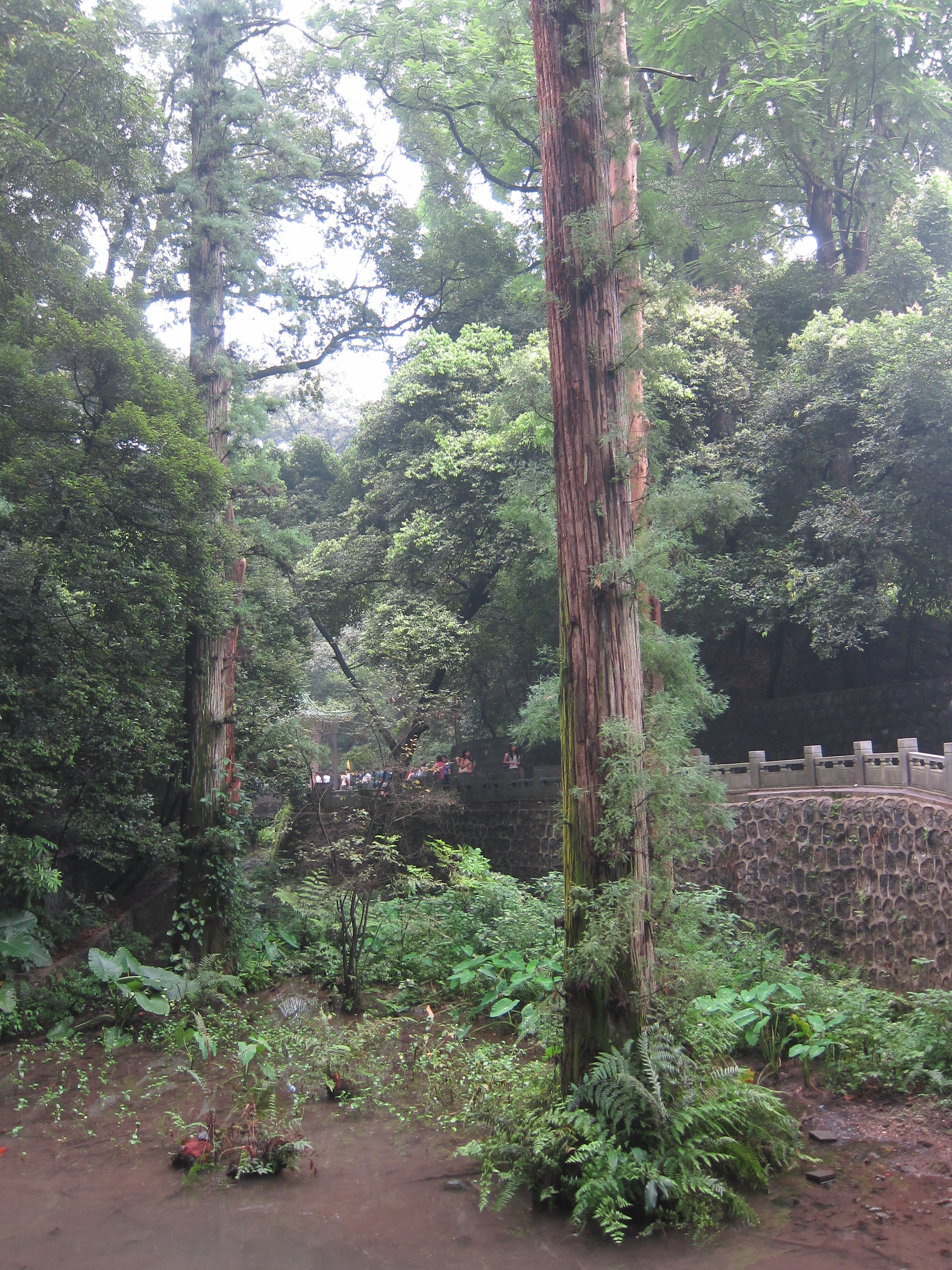
400- to 500-year-old trees in Nanhua Temple

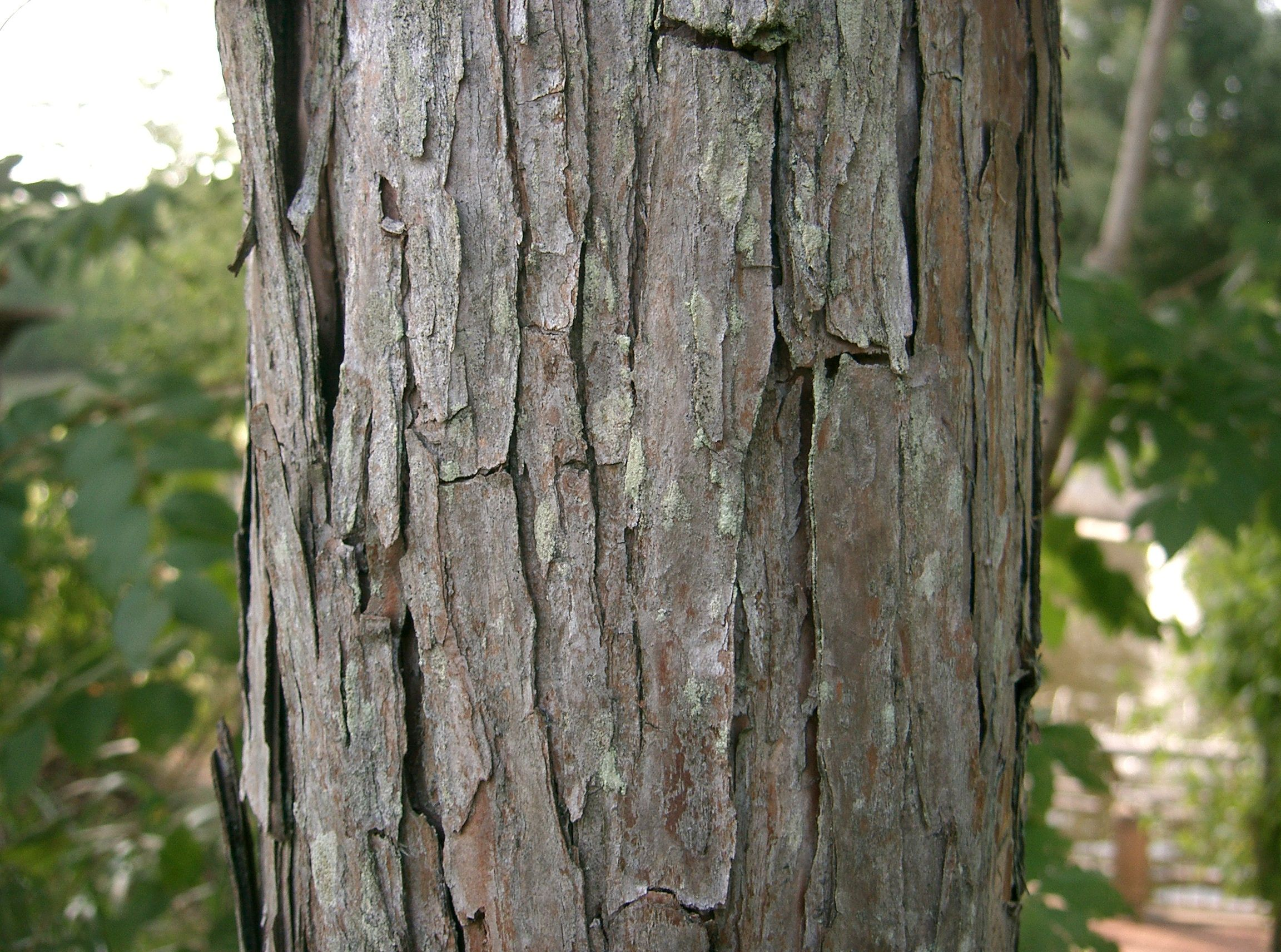
Bark of trunk
