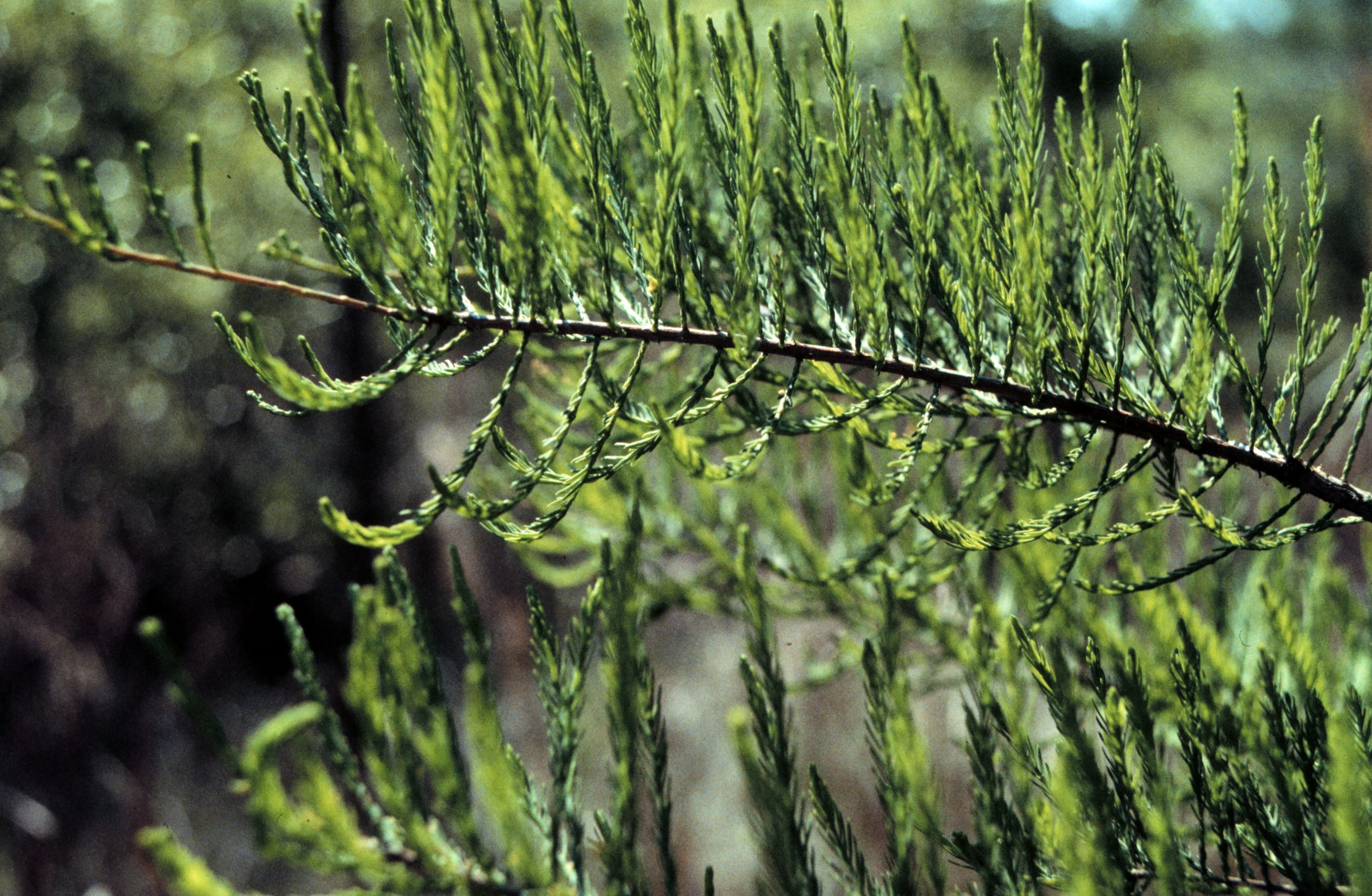
- Foliage

Conservation status
- Secure (NatureServe)

Scientific classification
- Kingdom: Plantae
- Clade: Tracheophytes
- Clade: Gymnosperms
- Division: Pinophyta
- Class: Pinopsida
- Order: Cupressales
- Family: Cupressaceae
- Genus: Taxodium
- Species: T. ascendens

Binomial name
- Taxodium ascendens Brongn.

= Taxodium ascendens =

Species of conifer

Taxodium ascendens, the pond cypress, is a deciduous conifer in the cypress family, Cupressaceae, native to North America. Many botanists treat it as a variety of bald cypress, Taxodium distichum (as T. distichum var. imbricatum) rather than as a distinct species, but it differs in habitat, occurring mainly in still blackwater rivers, ponds and swamps without silt-rich flood deposits. It predominates in cypress dome habitats.

== Description ==
Taxodium ascendens is a medium-sized deciduous conifer that is native to the southeastern United States. Taxodium ascendens reaches on average 15–18 metres (49–59 ft) in height. Pond cypress are typically between 50 – 85 ft tall and 15–30 ft wide. Compared to T. distichum, the leaves are shorter (3–10 mm long), slenderer and are on shoots that tend to be erect rather than spreading. The trunk is expanded at the base, even on young trees, assisting the tree in anchoring in the soft, muddy soil. The cones also tend to be smaller, not over 2.5 cm diameter. The pond cypress leaves are more needle-shaped (like the shaft of an awl or a screwdriver), in a spiral arrangement that stays close to the stem. The leaves are deciduous, simple, alternate, awl-like needles. Its cones are round, ovulate, between 1/2–1 1/4 inches (1.3–3.2 cm) long. The bark is also a paler gray color. Cypresses are known for their prominent "knees" and buttressed trunks that define the species however Taxodium ascendens is less likely to have "knees" than Taxodium distichum. Like bald cypresses, pond cypresses growing in water have a characteristic growth trait called cypress knees; these are woody projections called 'pneumatophores', which are sent above the water from the roots.Due to the dry nature of the habitat for the pond cypress, it has developed thicker, fire resistant bark.

== Distribution ==
This species is native to the southeastern United States, from southeastern Virginia to southeastern Louisiana and south into Florida except for the Florida Keys. Stunted individuals of pond cypress are notable in the dwarf cypress savanna of the Everglades National Park. Taxodium ascendens is most frequently found in the southeastern United States ranging from Virginia to Louisiana.

== Habitat ==
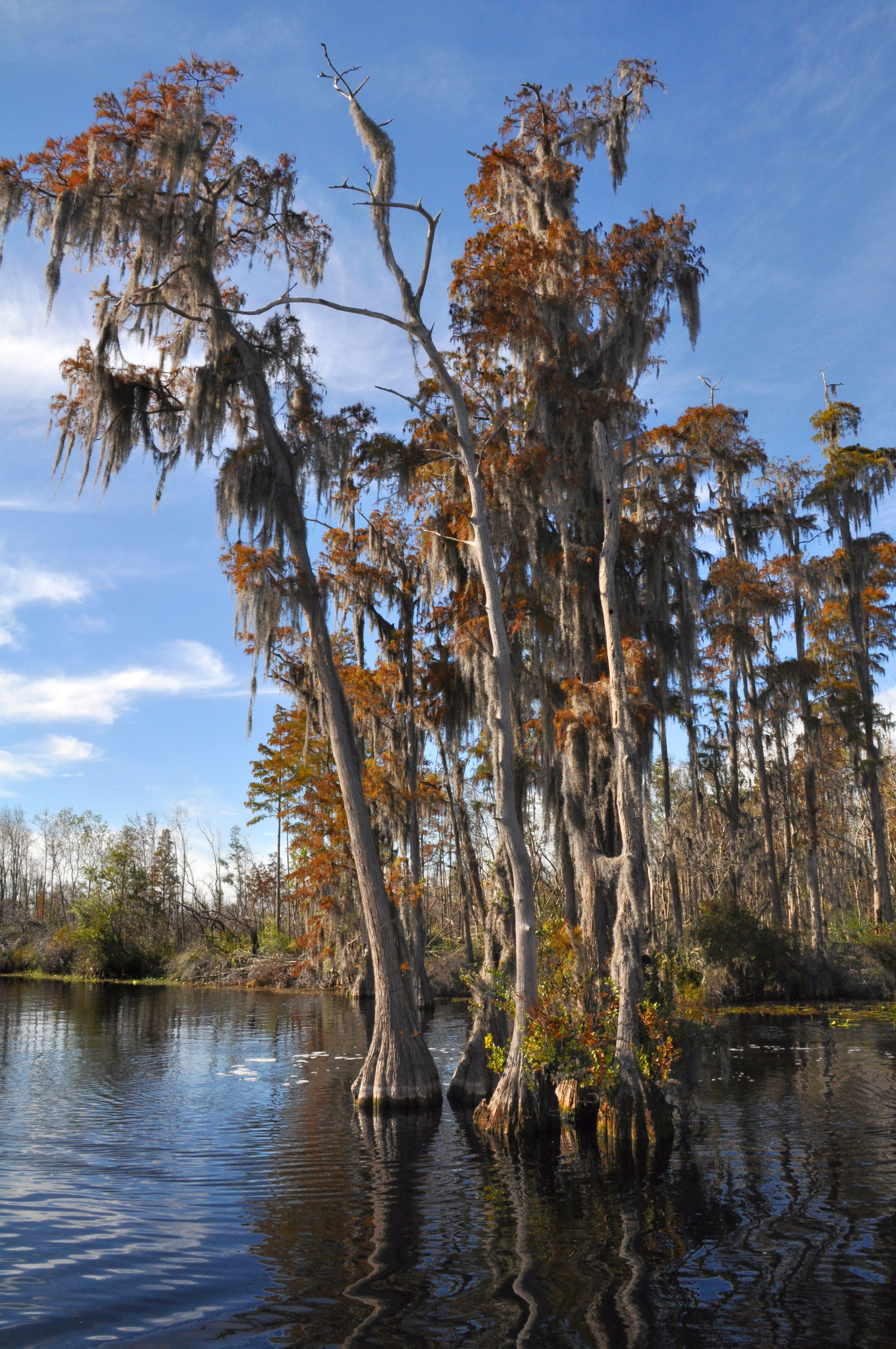
T. ascendens in black water, Okefenokee Swamp, Georgia, USA

Taxodium ascendens occurs naturally in shallow ponds, lake margins, swamps and wetlands. It prefers wet, poorly drained and acidic soils, at an altitude of 0–30 metres (0–98 ft) above sea level. The pond cypress preferred habitat is along the banks of ponds and lakes where the water is stagnant. This tree is native to southern swamps, bayous and rivers, and is known to tolerate extended periods of intense flooding. Pond cypress are most frequently found in isolated depressions fed by nutrient-poor, shallow ground water. Taxodium ascendens grows easily in average, medium to wet, moisture-retentive but reasonably well-drained soils in full sun. It prefers moist, acidic, sandy soils, but tolerates a wide range of soil conditions ranging from average moisture soils to wet soils in standing water.

== Taxonomy ==
Taxodium ascendens was discovered and identified by botanist Adolphe-Théodore Brongniart in 1833. The pond cypress is also known by other synonyms "Taxodium distichum var. imbricatum (Nutt.) Croom" and "Taxodium distichum var. ascendens (Brongn.) Mast."

== Uses ==
Taxodium ascendens is typically used for ornamental purposes or decoration in more urban environments unlike the bald cypress which can be used in heavy duty construction. Pond cypress are also used in wetland restoration and enhancement.

== Ecology ==
Like many other large semiaquatic plants, Taxodium ascendens roots and trunk provides structural complexity to shelter to young aquatic animals such as the larvae of amphibians and juvenile fish. Specifically the endangered flatwoods salamander will only lay their eggs in dry ponds populated with Taxodium ascendens.

Taxodium ascendens is susceptible to fires during the drier arid seasons where ponds lose the majority of their water but these trees have developed a thicker bark to better survive these conditions.

== Etymology ==
The varietal name "imbricatum" means overlapping, in reference to the manner in which the leaves lie on the twigs. The term “ascendens” suggests the leaves that point or grow upward in an arching or curving fashion.

== Conservation status ==
The pond cypress is considered "apparently secure" (S4) in North Carolina, "critically imperiled" (S1) in Virginia, and "exotic" in Delaware.
