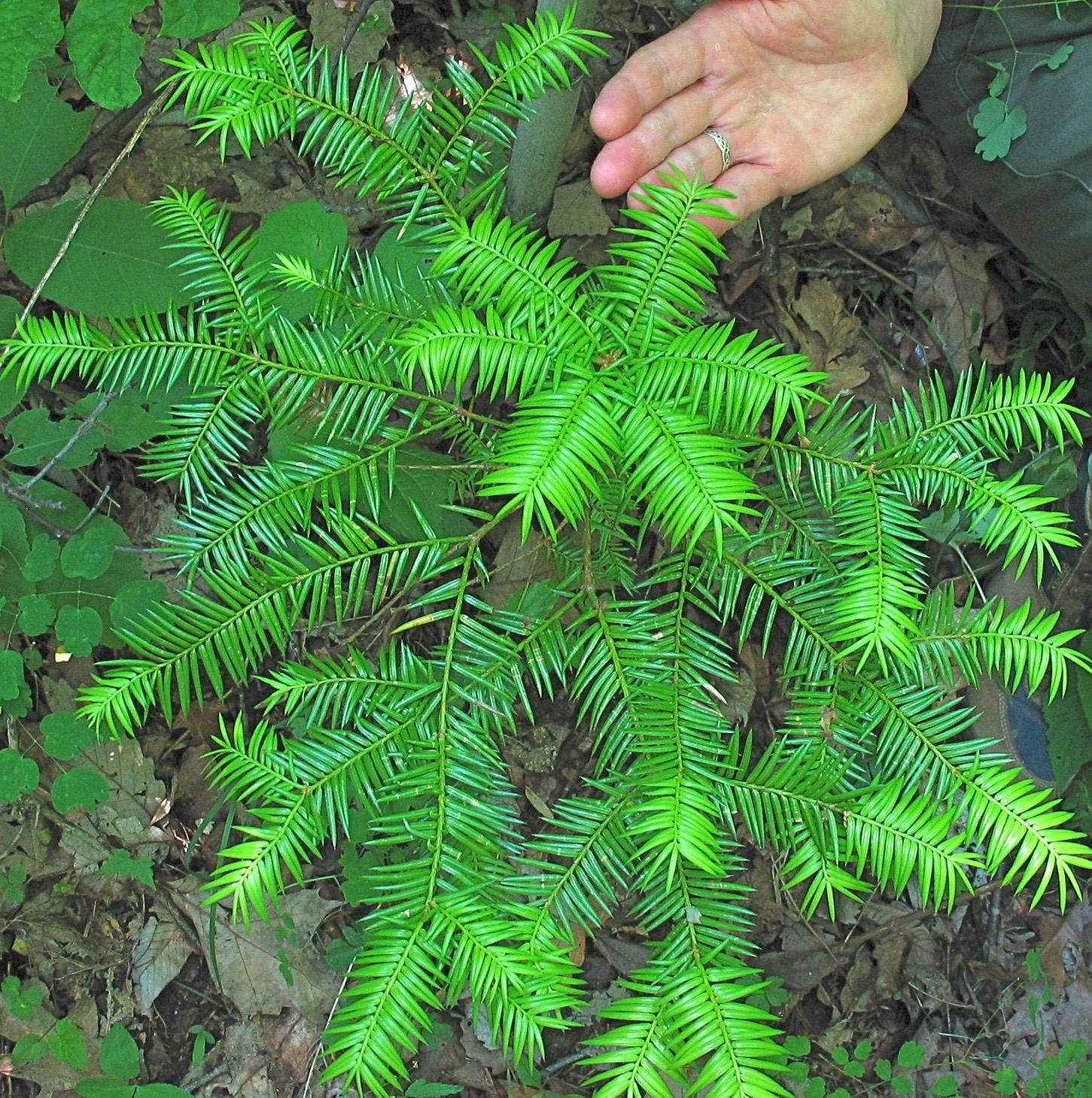
- A young Torreya taxifolia

Conservation status
- Critically Endangered (IUCN 3.1)

- Critically Imperiled (NatureServe)

Scientific classification
- Kingdom: Plantae
- Clade: Tracheophytes
- Clade: Gymnosperms
- Division: Pinophyta
- Class: Pinopsida
- Order: Cupressales
- Family: Taxaceae
- Genus: Torreya
- Species: T. taxifolia

Binomial name
- Torreya taxifolia Arn.
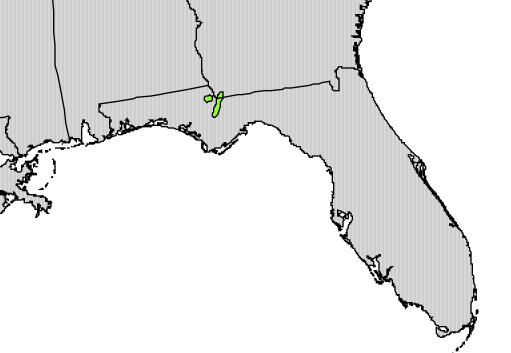
- Native range

Synonyms
- Caryotaxus taxifolia (Arn.) Henkel & W.Hochst.; Foetataxus taxifolia (Arn.) K.Koch; Tumion taxifolium (Arn.) Greene; Torreya montana hort.; Foetataxus montana J.Nelson, nom. illegit.

= Torreya taxifolia =

Species of plant

Torreya taxifolia, commonly known as Florida torreya or stinking-cedar, but also sometimes as Florida nutmeg or gopher wood, is an endangered coniferous subcanopy tree of the yew family, Taxaceae. It is native to only a small glacial refugium in the southeastern United States, at the state border region of northern Florida and southwestern Georgia.

== Taxonomy and naming ==
In 1838 this novel species was described by George Arnott Walker-Arnott from specimens sent to John Torrey and collected in Florida by Hardy Bryan Croom.

Arnott commemorated Torrey in the generic epithet. The etymology of the specific epithet is from Latin taxus, meaning 'yew', and folium, meaning 'leaf': i.e., 'yew-leaved'. Other species of Torreya have longer, less yew-like leaves, but this is not the reason that it was given this name, as the other species were described after this one.

The University of North Carolina Herbarium has a single specimen, originally from the Jesup Herbarium of Dartmouth College, sent by Croom in 1833 from the "Apalache River" (now, Apalachicola River). Curiously, it was first labelled as "Taxus montana Willd.", a South American tree, which was then later changed to Podocarpus taxifolia from southern New Zealand, and finally relabelled as Torreya taxifolia.

Taxonomic and naming changes also occurred when European botanists analyzed herbarium samples. The species was moved to the junior synonym Caryotaxus taxifolia in 1865 by Johann Baptist Henkel and Wilhelm Christian Hochstetter in their monograph on the conifers of the world, Synopsis der Nadelhölzer. In 1873 Karl Heinrich Emil Koch moved the species to Foetataxus taxifolia. In 1891 Edward Lee Greene validated Constantine Samuel Rafinesque-Schmaltz's generic epithet Tumion and erroneously moved this species there as Tumion taxifolium.

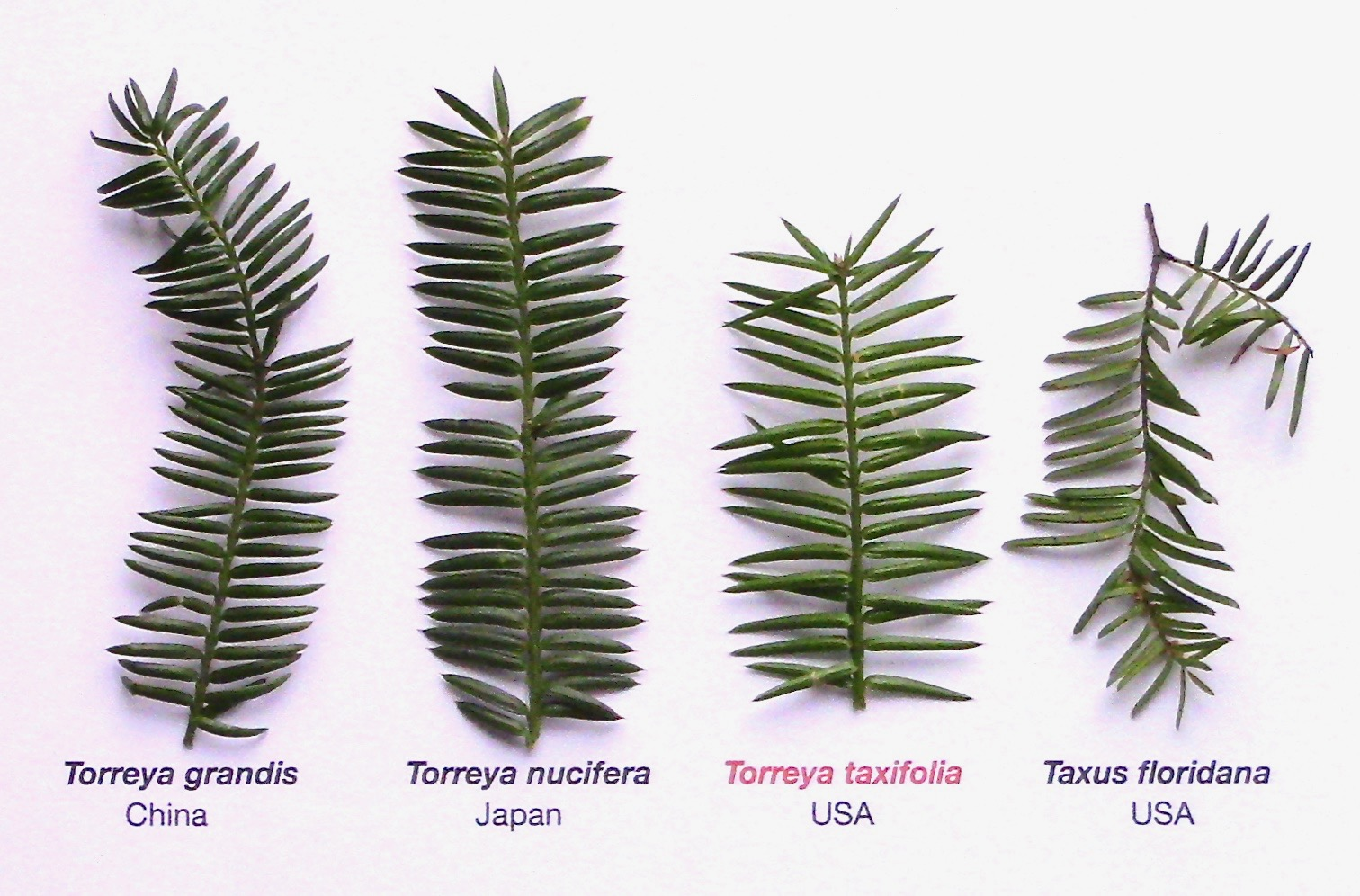
Torreya taxifolia compared with two Asian species and Florida yew

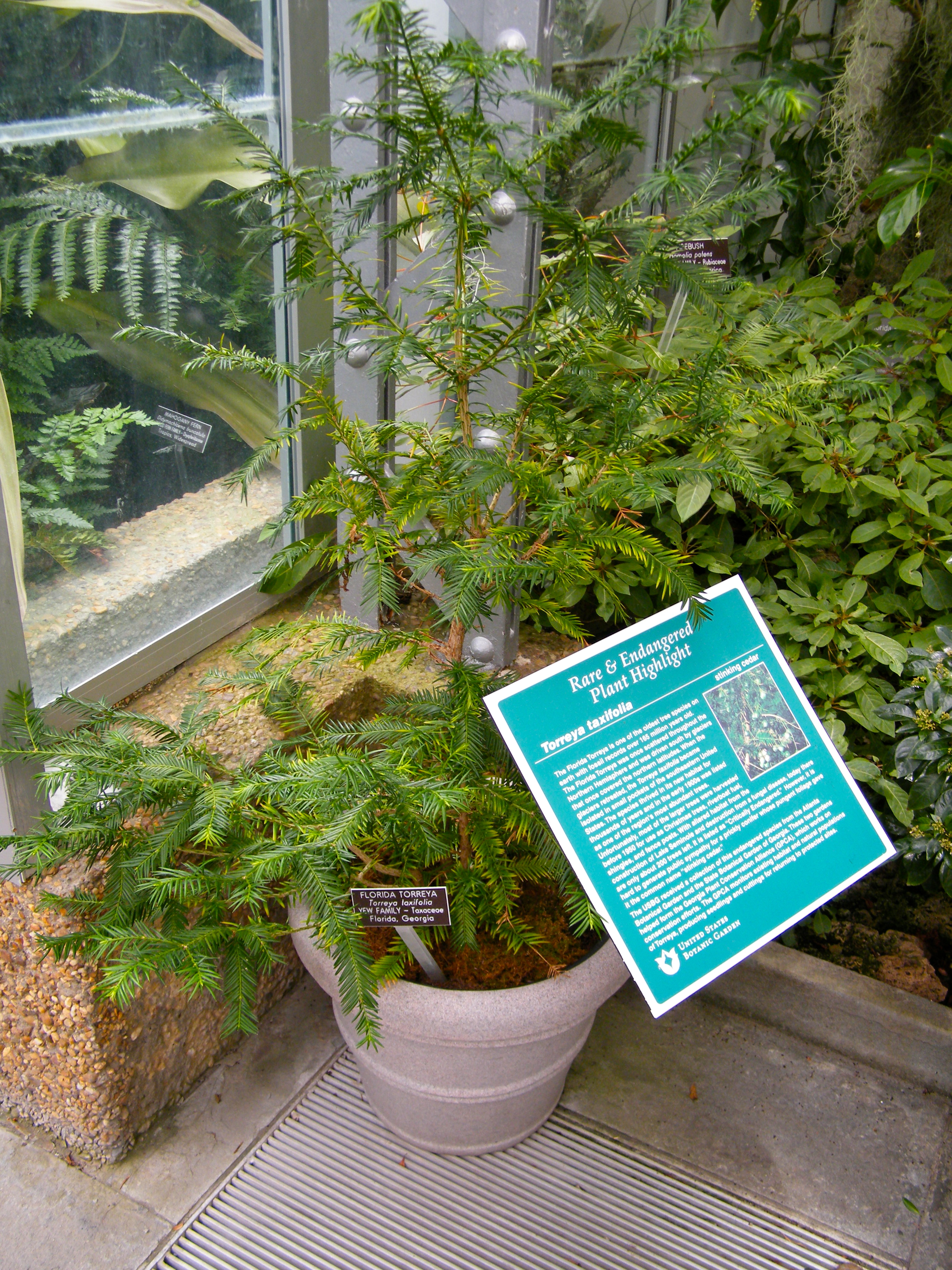
Wild specimen at the National Botanic Gardens

In Thomas Nuttall's entry about Torreya taxifolia in his book about American trees, which was published in 1849 although it had been for the most part completed in 1841, he relates that in the correspondence Torrey had sent him, mention had been made of specimens of another species of taxoid tree which had been sent to him by Croom from the same region. To this plant Nuttall "doubtfully attaches the name" Taxus montana, somewhat of a nomen nudum, because Nuttall never actually described the plant besides quoting a summary description from Torrey's letter to him. Nuttall is doubtful about the taxon, because according to him it seems "scarcely distinct" from T. brevifolia of the Pacific Northwest. Following the publication of this work, however, he was attributed as the author of this scientific name. By 1865 this name was misapplied to Torreya taxifolia under the name Torreya montana. Henkel and Hochstetter synonymised this taxon with T. taxifolia in their work mentioned above. According to the Index Kewensis this was in error; the name Taxus montana had actually already been given to a species, now Prumnopitys montana, described (validated, in fact) in 1806 by Carl Ludwig Willdenow from specimens collected by Alexander von Humboldt and Aimé Bonpland on their famous scientific exploration of the Americas, and Nuttall had in fact referred to Willdenow's species. John Nelson, in his more utilitarian as opposed to scientific 1866 horticultural handbook of firs and pines for growing in Britain, introduced the name Foetataxus montana to write about Torreya taxifolia, apparently unaware of the German publication the previous year. In fact, all these sources were wrong, for Nuttall states that he found a newer specimen of Croom's, of the same taxon, in the Herbarium of the Academy of Natural Sciences of Philadelphia labelled as Taxus floridana! Despite that the original synonymy with T. floridana, all these names are still maintained in the synonymy of Torreya taxifolia in some modern databases as of 2020.

== Type species of genus Torreya ==
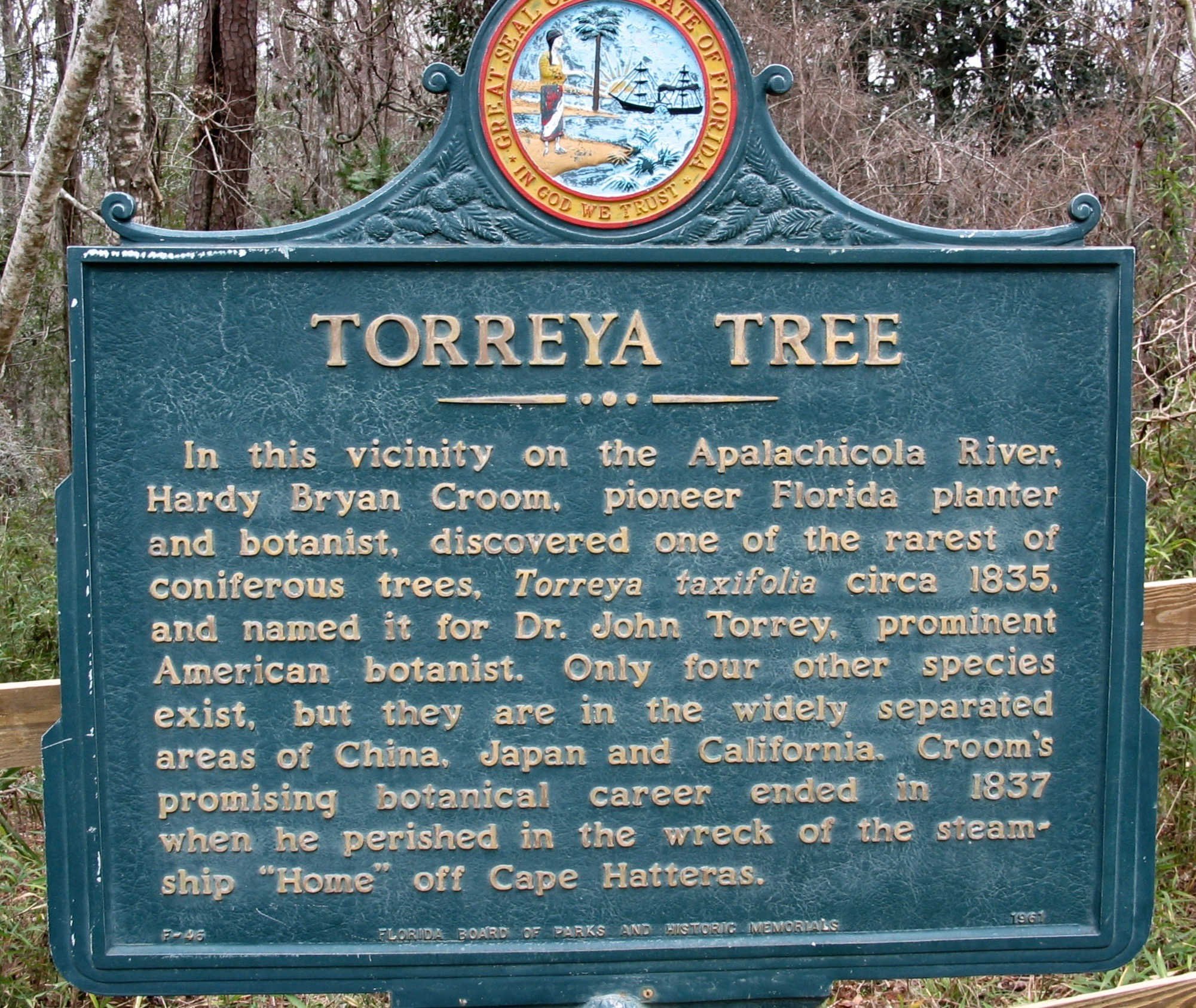
Plaque on the tree's discovery by Hardy Bryan Croom (Torreya State Park, Florida)

Torreya taxifolia is the type species of the genus Torreya, owing to the timing of its entering herbaria used in Western science. The genus has far greater representation in east Asia and also in the mountains of California (Torreya californica) than in its relictual range in Florida.

Family level classification has been controversial, but with genetic analysis it is generally placed in the yew family, Taxaceae. Its closest relative within the yew family is genus Amentotaxus. The genus Cephalotaxus also used to be considered a close relative, but it is now classified within an entirely different family, Cupressaceae.

Vegetative structure among Torreya species is very similar, as seen in the image here comparing four branchlets. All samples were taken and photographed onsite at Cox Arboretum in Georgia (US). All were young saplings growing in similar light and soil conditions. Florida yew, Taxus floridana, is easily distinguished from Florida torreya by touch: while both genera have pointed leaf tips, the yew tip is soft while torreya is so hardened it easily punctures skin.

== Common names ==
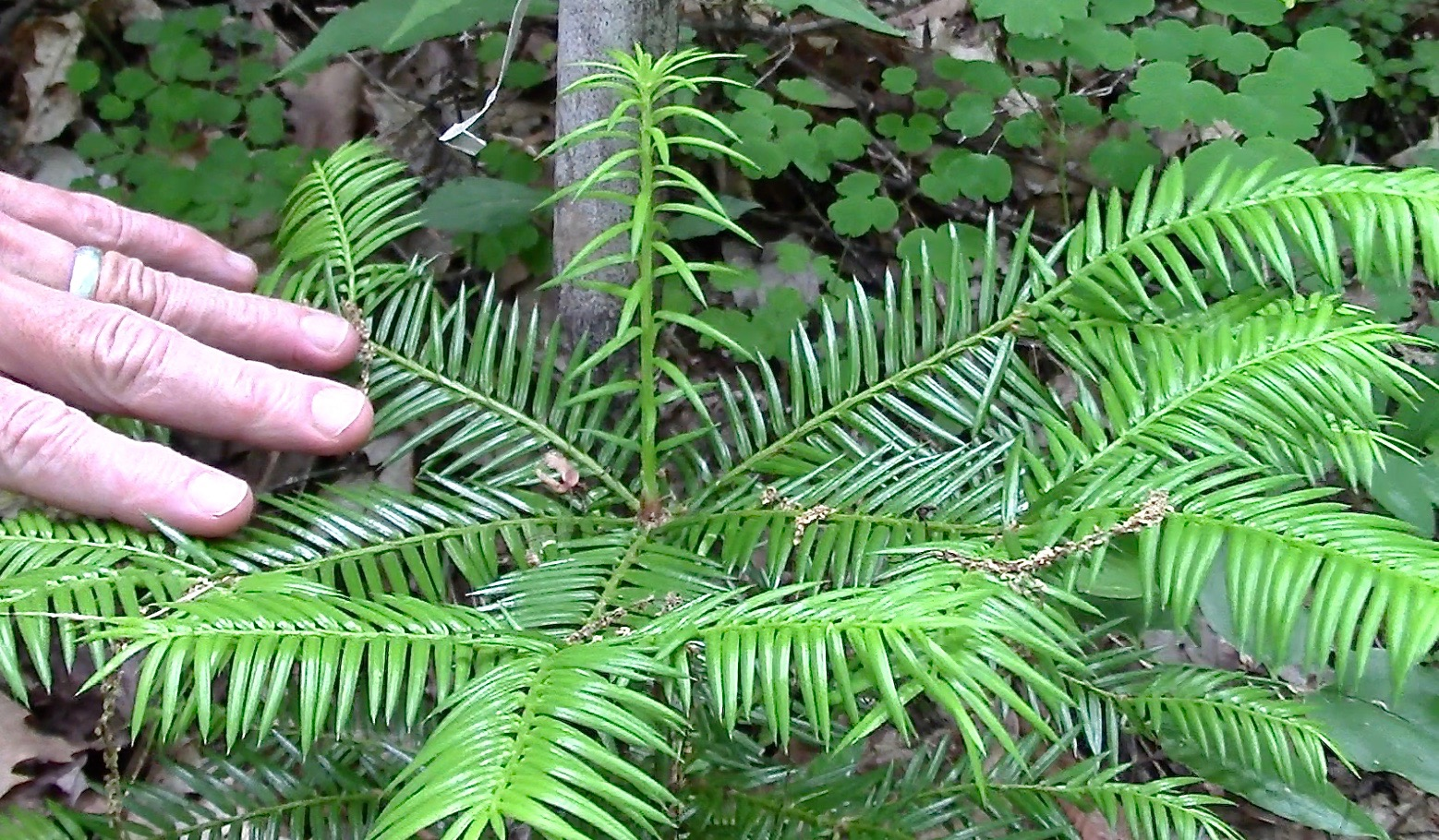
Torreya taxifolia new growth

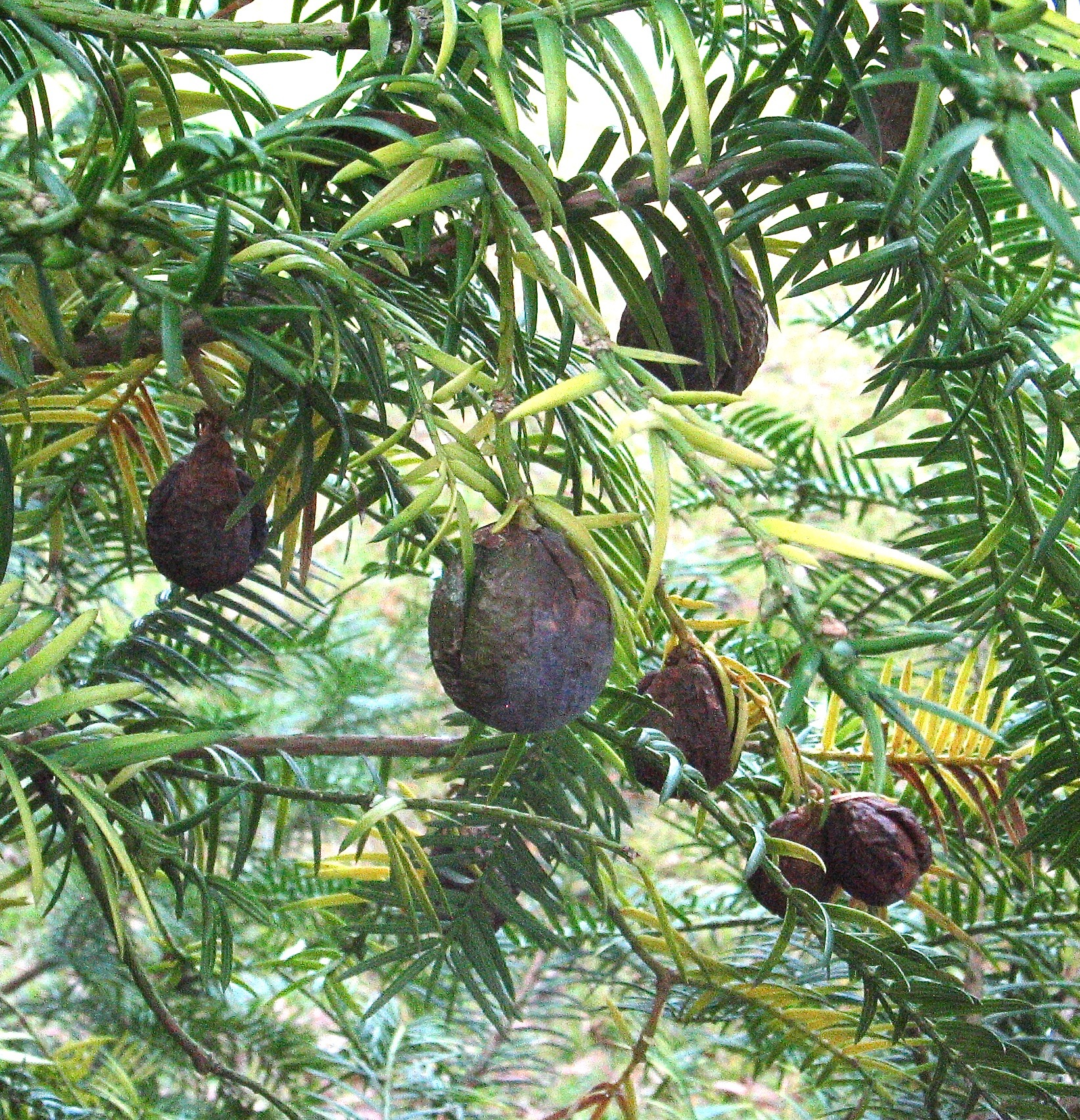
Ripe torreya seeds, October 2013, Mt. Olive, North Carolina

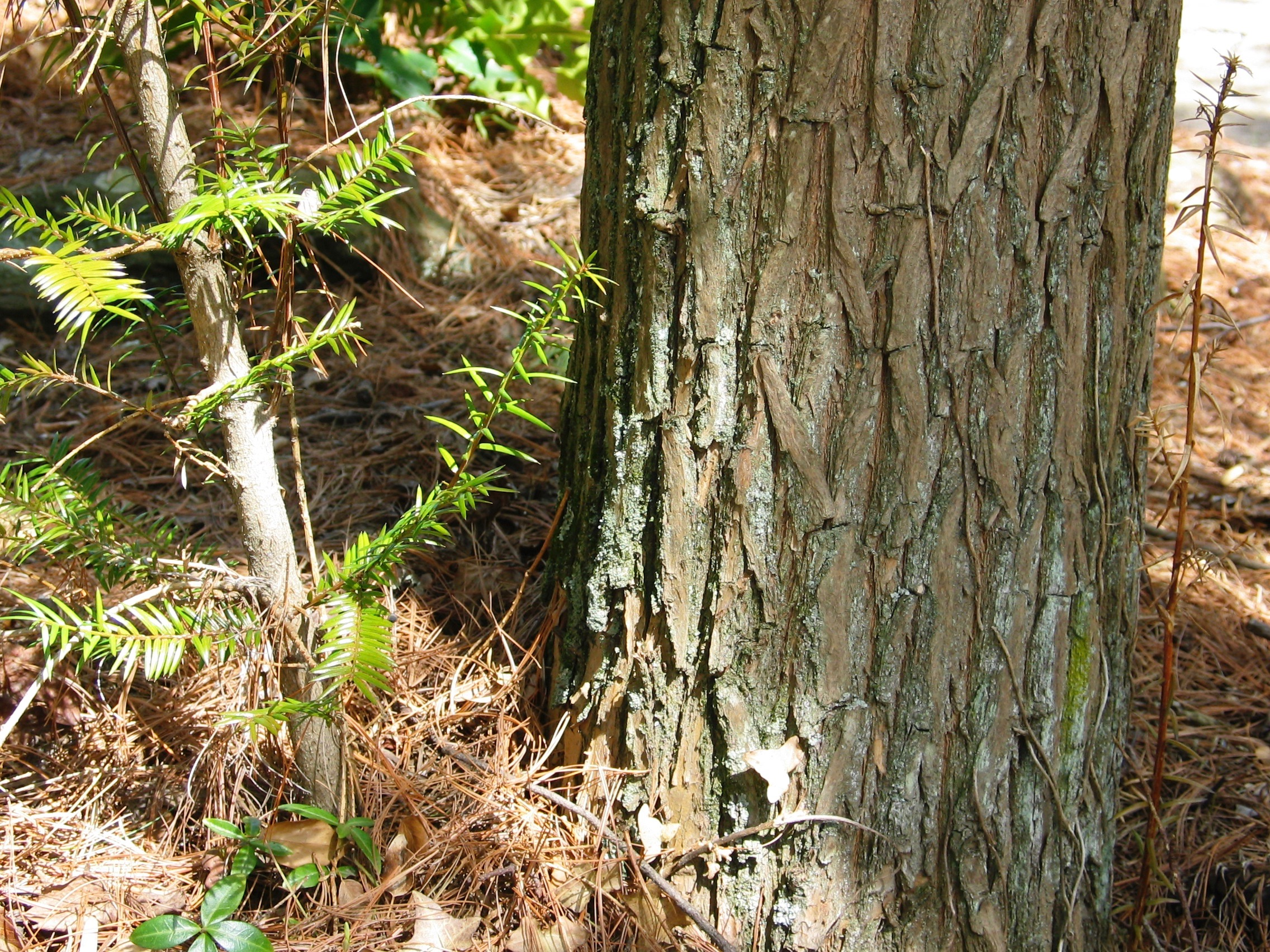
One of the original 1939 plantings of Florida Torreya at the Biltmore Estate near Asheville, NC (2004).

The United States government official page listing the endangered status of Torreya taxifolia shows only one common name, Florida torreya. The current (2020) version of the official recovery plan for the species lists three common names, in order: Florida torreya, Florida nutmeg, and stinking cedar. The current (1993) page for this species of the U.S. Department of Agriculture Fire Effects Information System, lists six common names, in this order: Florida torreya, Florida nutmeg, gopherwood, polecat wood, Savin, stinking cedar.

Internationally, the common names listed for Torreya taxifolia are, in order, Florida Nutmeg Tree, Florida Torreya, Gopherwood, and Stinking Cedar. This is in accordance with the latest (2010) update of the species page of The IUCN Red List of Threatened Species. The Integrated Taxonomic Information System lists two common names: Florida nutmeg and Florida torreya.

There is a long history of documented common names that are also paired with descriptions of the species features that may have given rise to such names. One of the first prominent botanists whose documentation of the species includes common names was Thomas Nuttall. Writing in the early 1840s, he proposed the name "yew-leaved torreya." He noted that locally the species was known as "stinking cedar." He ascribed this name to the "strong and peculiar odour" of the timber, especially when it is "bruised or burnt". He also mentioned that the seed, covered in an aril, is approximately the size of a nutmeg.

In 1865 the German botanists Johann Baptist Henkel and Wilhelm Christian Hochstetter noted that the Americans called the tree "stinking cedar" and "wild nutmeg". They explained that the name "nutmeg" is derived from the bone-hard shelled and acorn-sized seeds, which are covered in an aril somewhat similar to that of true nutmeg. They also described that when the leaves are crushed they exude a pungent and disagreeable odour, which is why the local Americans used the name "stinking cedar". They themselves called the plant "Torrey's Nuss-Eibe", which translates into English as "Torrey's nut-yew." According to the British gardening writer John Nelson in 1866, Torreya species in general were known as "stinking cedars" or "stinking nutmegs" by the locals. Recommending the name "mountain yew" for British use, Nelson was unaware that this Florida species grows almost at sea level — and thus nowhere near any mountains Of all species of its genus, Florida torreya is the only one whose historically native habitat is not in mountainous terrain.

In the spring of 1875, Harvard botanist Asa Gray embarked on a trip to the panhandle of Florida, to "make a pious pilgrimage to the secluded native haunts of that rarest of trees, the Torreya taxifolia". The trees observed by Gray during that trip grew up to a meter in circumference and 20 meters tall. Pertaining to its common name, he wrote:

"The people of the district knew it by the name of 'Stinking Cedar' or 'Savine' — the unsavory adjective referring to a peculiar unpleasant smell which the wounded bark exhales. The timber is valued for fence-posts and the like, and is said to be as durable as red cedar. I may add that, in consequence of the stir we made about it, the people are learning to call it Torreya. They are proud of having a tree which, as they have rightly been told, grows nowhere else in the world."

== Description ==
=== Technical description ===
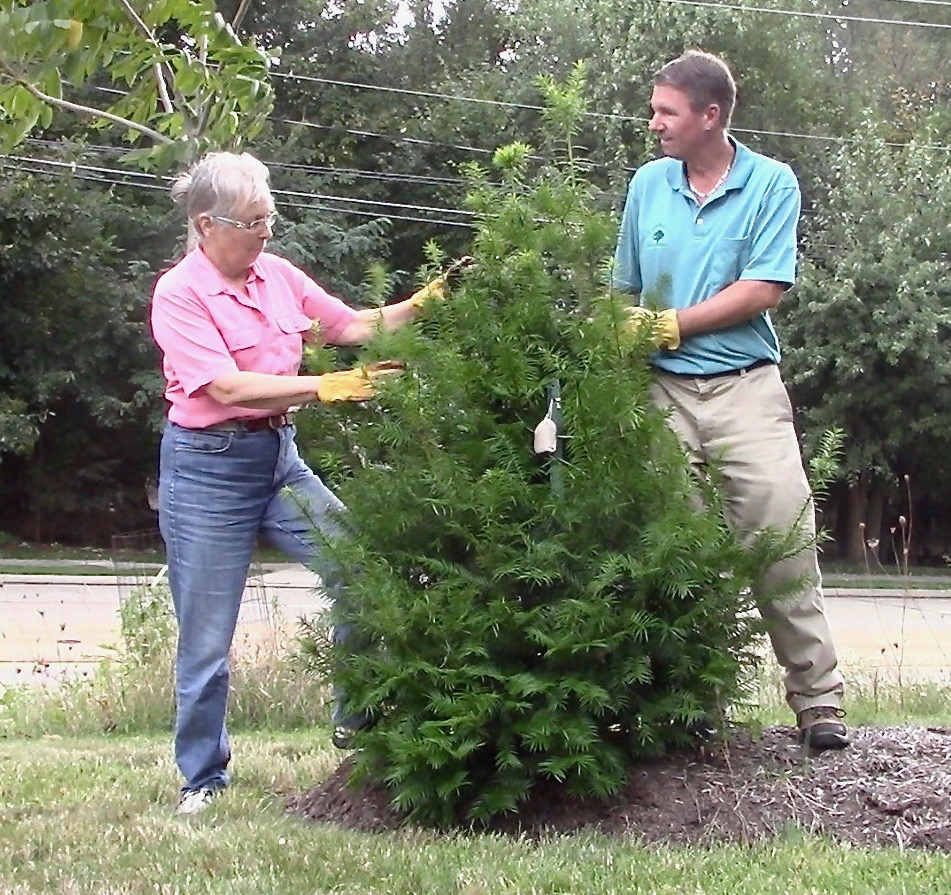
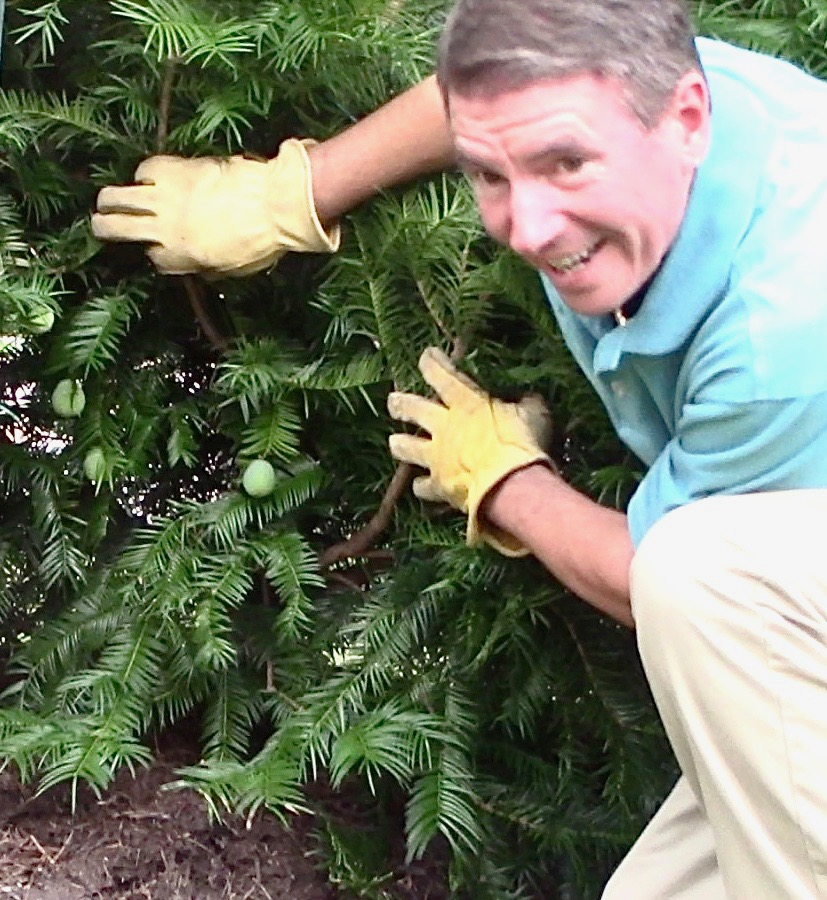
Florida torreya will grow as a symmetrical cone-shaped conifer, with leafy branches remaining at ground level, if horticulturally planted and maintained in full sun. LEFT: October 2018 Fred Bess shows Connie Barlow, founder of Torreya Guardians, one of the two male trees he planted in his front yard in Cleveland, Ohio. RIGHT: Close-up of seeds in one of his two female trees.

Torreya taxifolia is an evergreen tree that may reach heights of 18 metres (59 ft) with an 80 centimetres (31 in) diameter trunk, although it typically grew to 9–12 metres (30–39 ft) tall and 30–50 centimetres (12–20 in) in diameter, and most stands today are composed of immature trees of less than 3 metres (9.8 ft) tall. The crown is open and conical in overall shape, with whorled branches. These branches are spreading to slightly drooping. The bark of two-year-old branches are coloured yellowish-green, yellowish-brown or grey. On mature trees the bark is only about 0.5 inches (1.3 cm) thick and is irregularly divided by shallow fissures.

The stiff, needle-like leaves are sharp to the touch and are arranged in two ranks on the branches. Images on this page show their dimensions; sizes vary depending on access to sunlight and the tree's overall health. The leaves are glossy green above and light green below, with a very slightly sunken grayish stripe of stomata on either side of the midrib on the underside, and slightly round in transverse profile on the topside. The leaves have an unpleasant, strongly pungent, resinous odor when crushed.

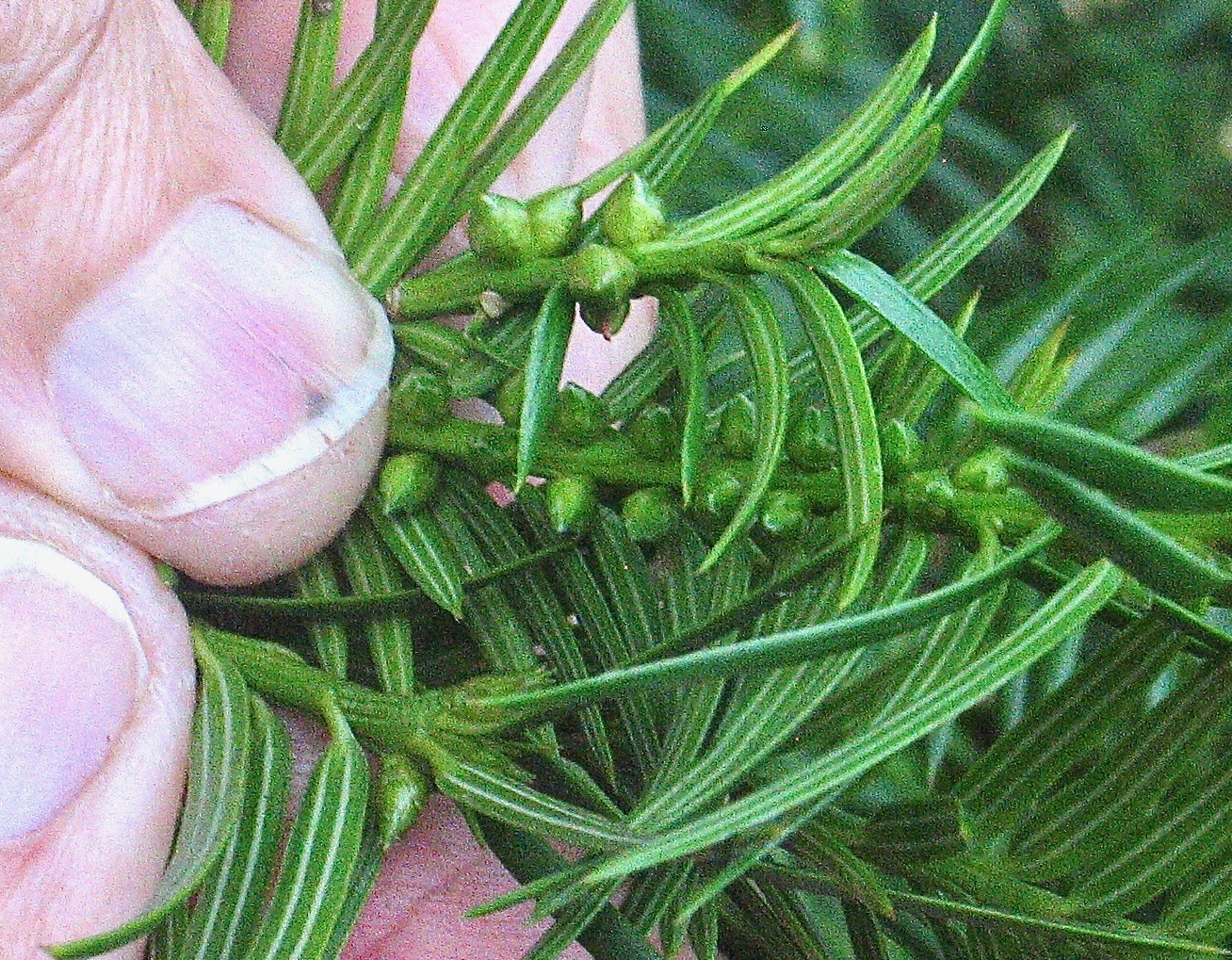
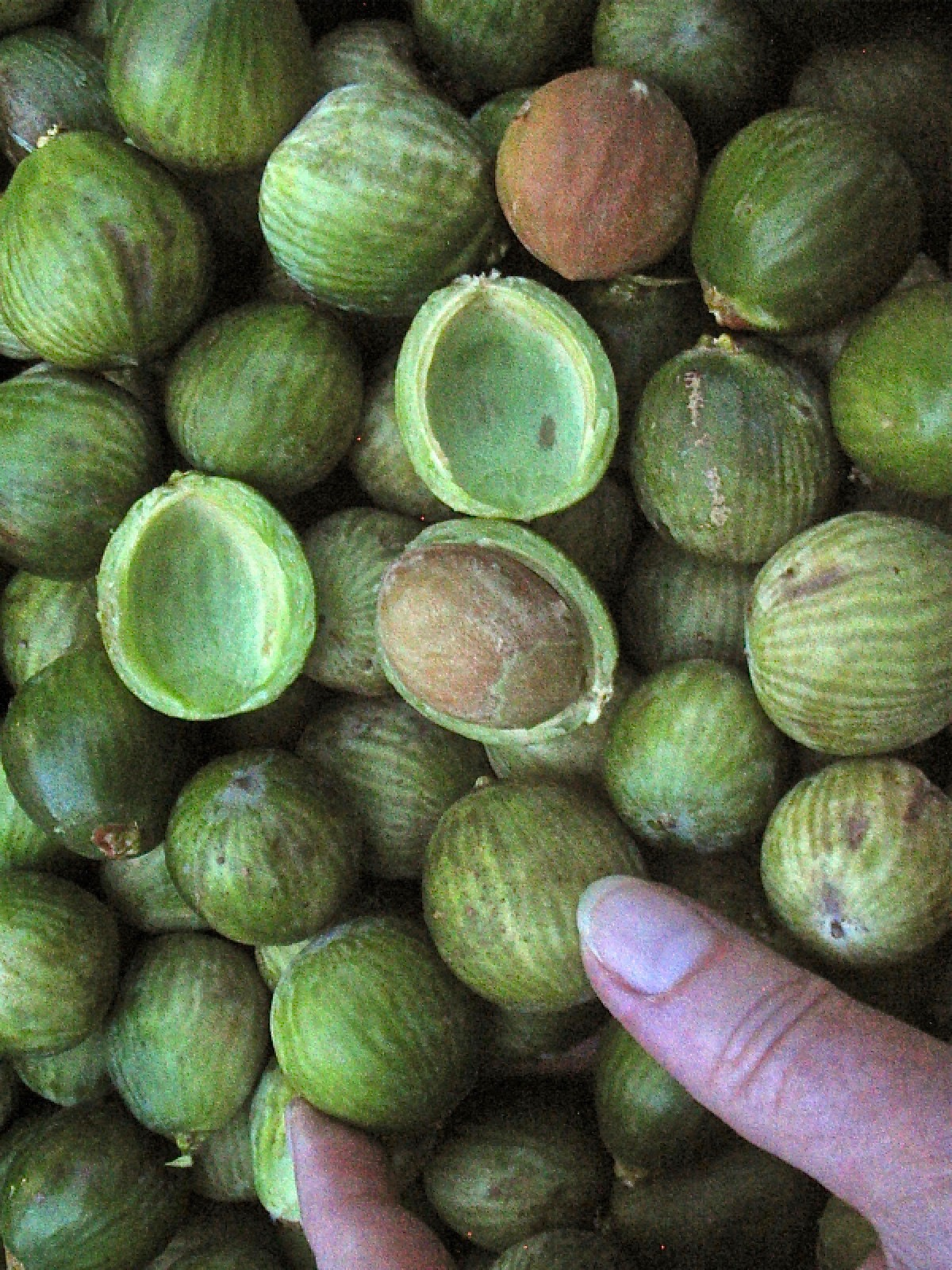
LEFT: October 2013 the ability of a Florida torreya to bear both male and female cones on the same tree was documented at the home of A.J. Bullard in Mt. Olive, NC. RIGHT: Mature seeds are large and flesh-covered.

Genus Torreya is subdioecious, with separate male and female plants that may however include branches bearing cones of the opposite sex. Male cones appear in the axils of the needles of the prior year, while female cones appear in the axils of the needles of the current year. However, the female cones do not ripen until the second year. The male (pollen) cones resemble those of a common yew, but are much larger and have imbricated scales (bracts) at their base. They are 5–7 mm long, grouped in lines along the underside of a shoot. The female cones when young are more angular than the male (as seen in the photo to the right). They are grouped two to five together near the tip of a branchlet. Tiny at first, they mature in about 18 months to a drupe-like structure with the single large nut-like seed (photo at right) surrounded by a fleshy covering called an aril, 2.5–3.5 centimetres (0.98–1.38 in) long including aril, about the size of a nutmeg. The aril is green but becomes streaked with purple as it matures, advancing to orange or fully purple in late fall. Unlike true yews, in which the aril forms a "cup" around the seed, in this plant the aril completely encloses the seed, leaving only a minute perforation at the end. When the aril is removed, the seed bears a striking resemblance to a large acorn.

=== Subcanopy growth adaptations ===
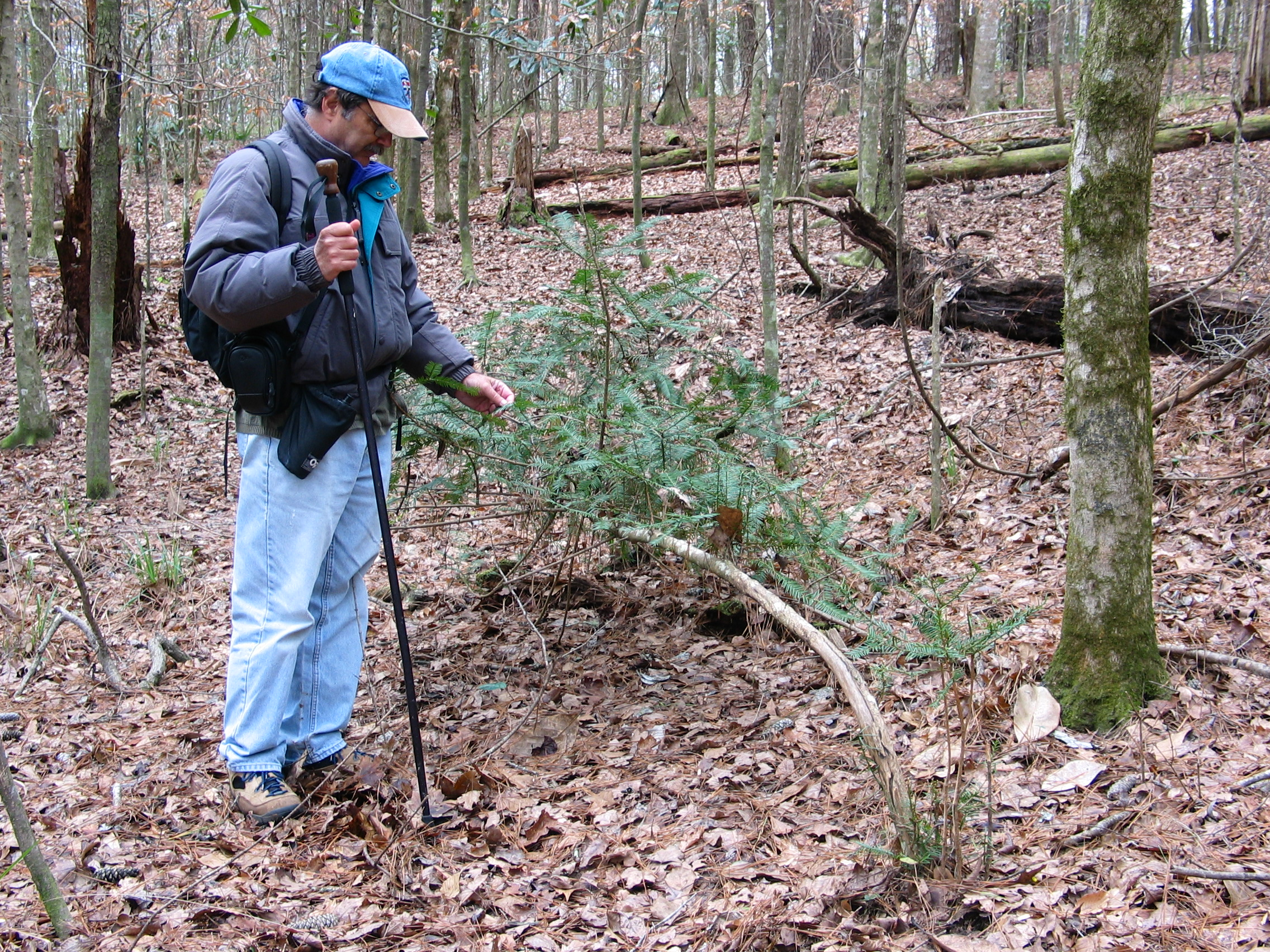
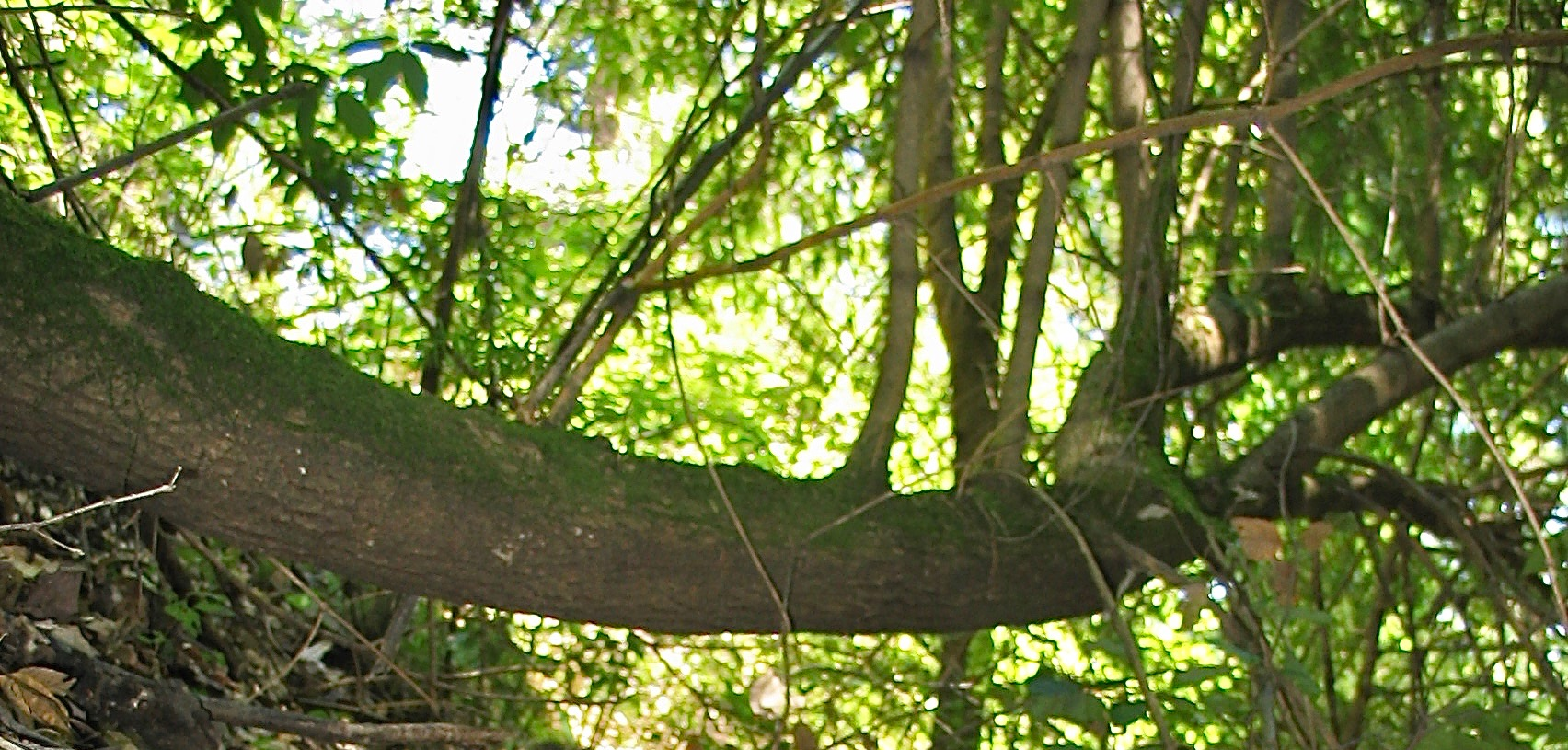
Florida torreya (LEFT, winter) adopts a leaning orientation in quest of sunlight under a deciduous canopy in northern Florida. Its close cousin, California torreya (RIGHT, summer), leans in the extreme beneath an evergreen canopy of Coast redwood and Douglas-fir in its native range.

Species within the Torreya genus are all adapted to establish and grow slowly as subcanopy woody plants in forest habitats of moderate to dense shade. In this way, their leaf structure and growth habit resemble species of yew, genus Taxus, which is a close relative.

Stems will lean in very shady conditions, in quest of patches of sunlight. Extremely leaning stems within a shady subcanopy gather moss as they age. An old leaning stem that fails to access sunlight will perish, but not before the long-lived root crown has given rise to one or more younger stems searching for sunlight in different directions.

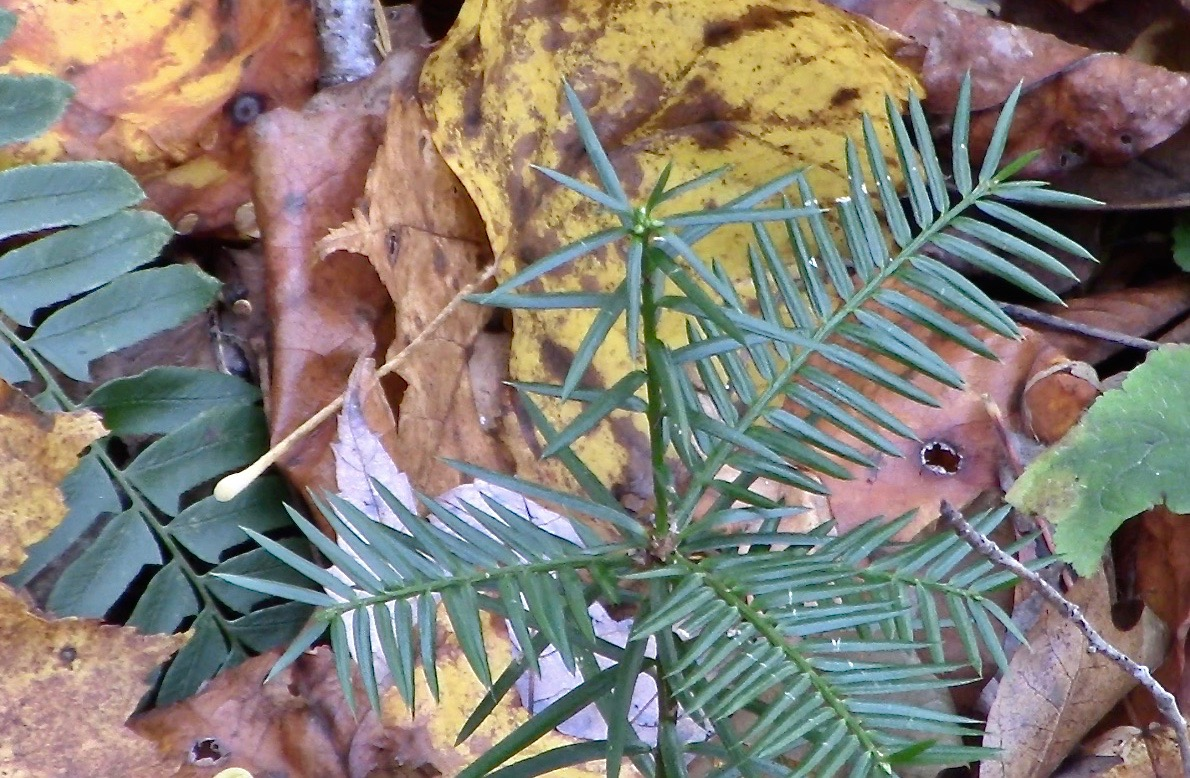
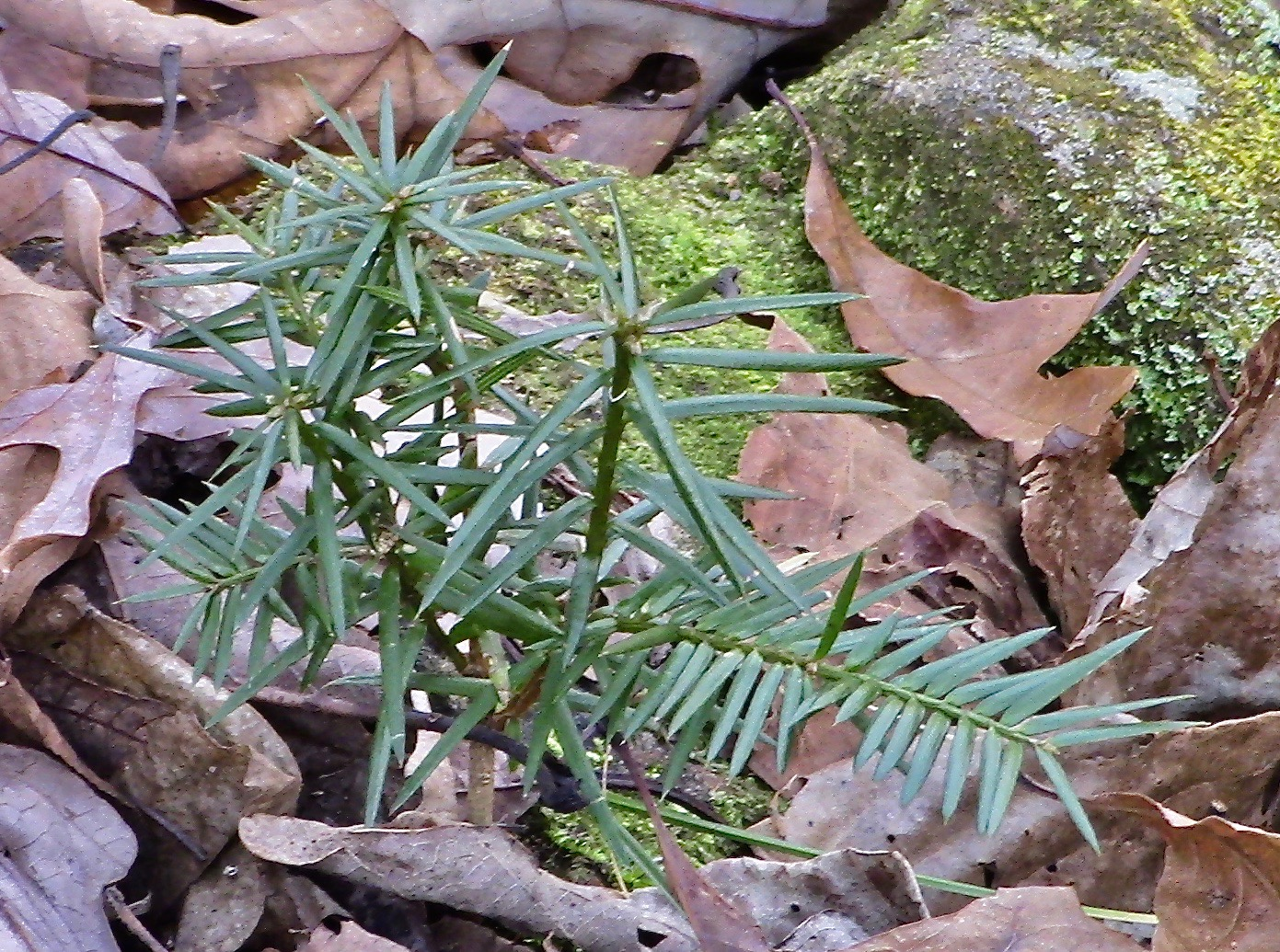
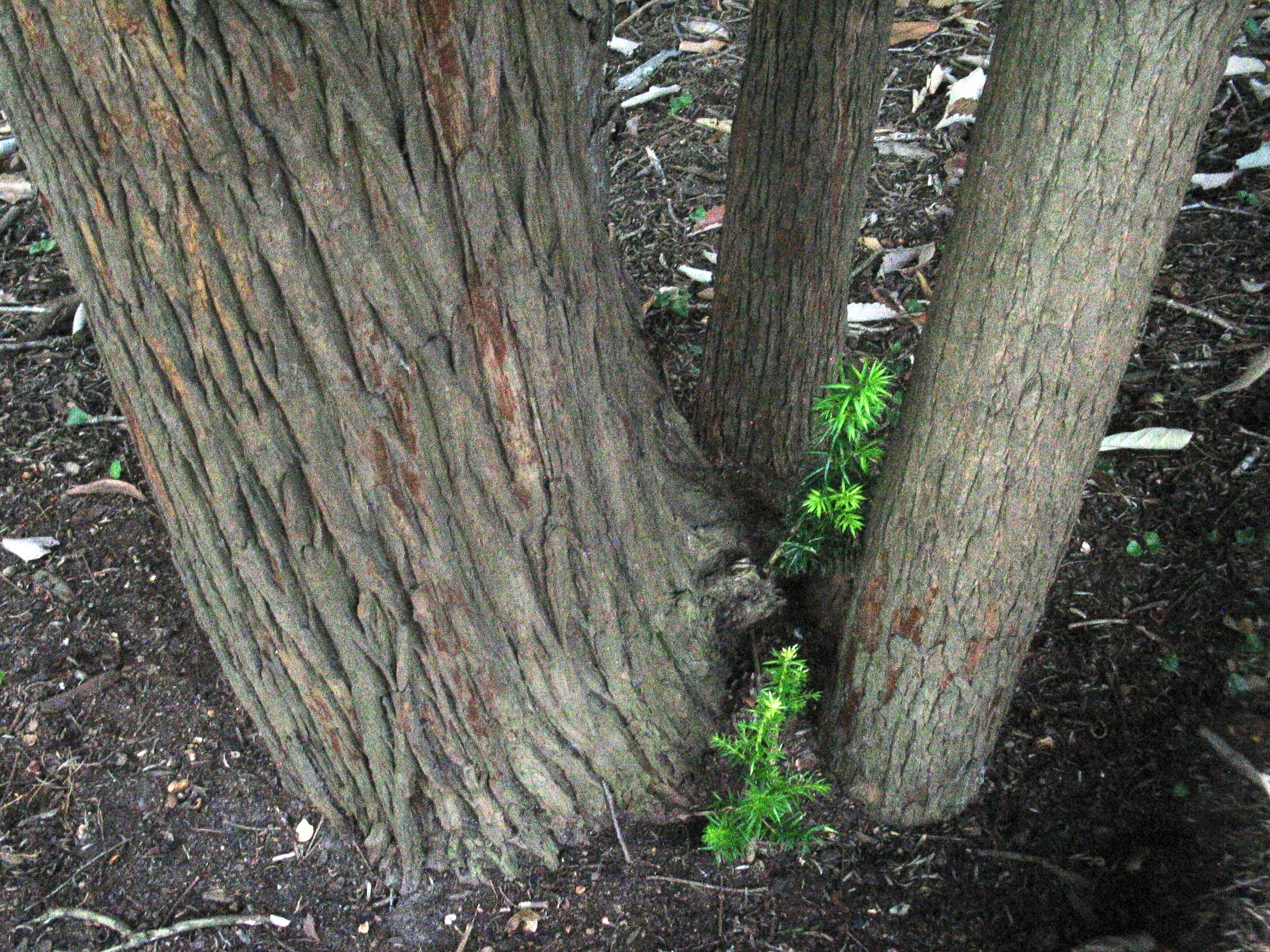
Four years after a seed was planted in a deciduous forest in North Carolina, this seedling (LEFT) had not yet been damaged by rodent or deer herbivory. In contrast, a seedling of similar age (MIDDLE) had become multi-stemmed owing to herbivory in a forest in Alabama. But even when this species encounters sunlight, it still produces additional basal stems occasionally, as in this old horticultural planting in North Carolina (RIGHT).

Basal sprouting new stems from the root crown is thus another vital adaptation for long-term persistence in a subcanopy ecological niche. Basal sprouting will occur if young seedlings are browsed by herbivores. It also occurs in saplings when a multi-stemmed growth form enables a wider quest for patches of sunlight. But even in healthy, mature trees, new basal growth is present as a hedge against damage to the main stem. (References in the image caption.)

== Distribution ==
=== Wild population ===
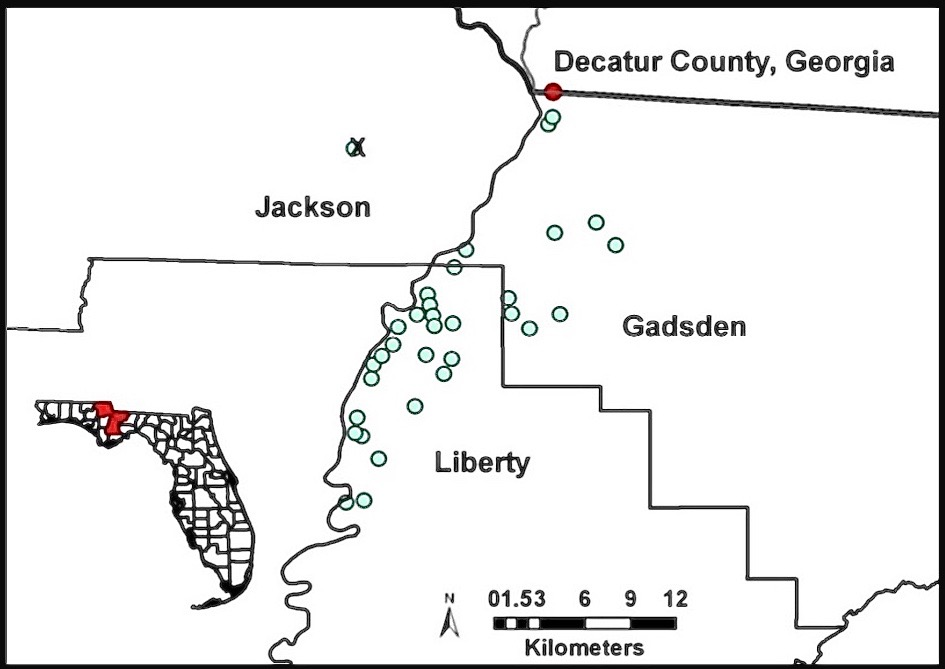
Map showing the counties and locations of populations of Florida torreya along the Apalachicola River. The lone population in Jackson County is marked with an X, as it no longer exists.

Torreya taxifolia is restricted to limestone bluffs and ravines along the east bank of the Apalachicola River in the central part of the northern Florida Panhandle and immediately adjacent southernmost Georgia. There used to be one small colony west of the Apalachicola at Dog Pond in Jackson County, but it no longer exists.

This endemic tree grows along the Apalachicola River just south of the confluence of the Chattahoochee River and the Flint River, which drain the southern Blue Ridge Mountains, a subrange of the Appalachian Mountains. It occurs only in the Florida counties of Gadsden and Liberty and extends one mile into Decatur County, Georgia. The area in which it naturally occurs is 203 square kilometres (50,000 acres), stretching 35 kilometres (22 miles) along the Apalachicola River.

Alvan Wentworth Chapman, a leading botanist of his time in the southeastern states, wrote in 1885 that "Florida torreya" was found only in "widely separated clumps or groves" and appeared to be "exclusively confined" to the cliffs along the east shore of the river and to "the precipitous sides of the ravines" that dissected those cliffs. "It is never seen in the low ground along the river, nor on the elevated plateau east of it, nor, indeed, on level ground anywhere."

=== Prehistoric distribution ===
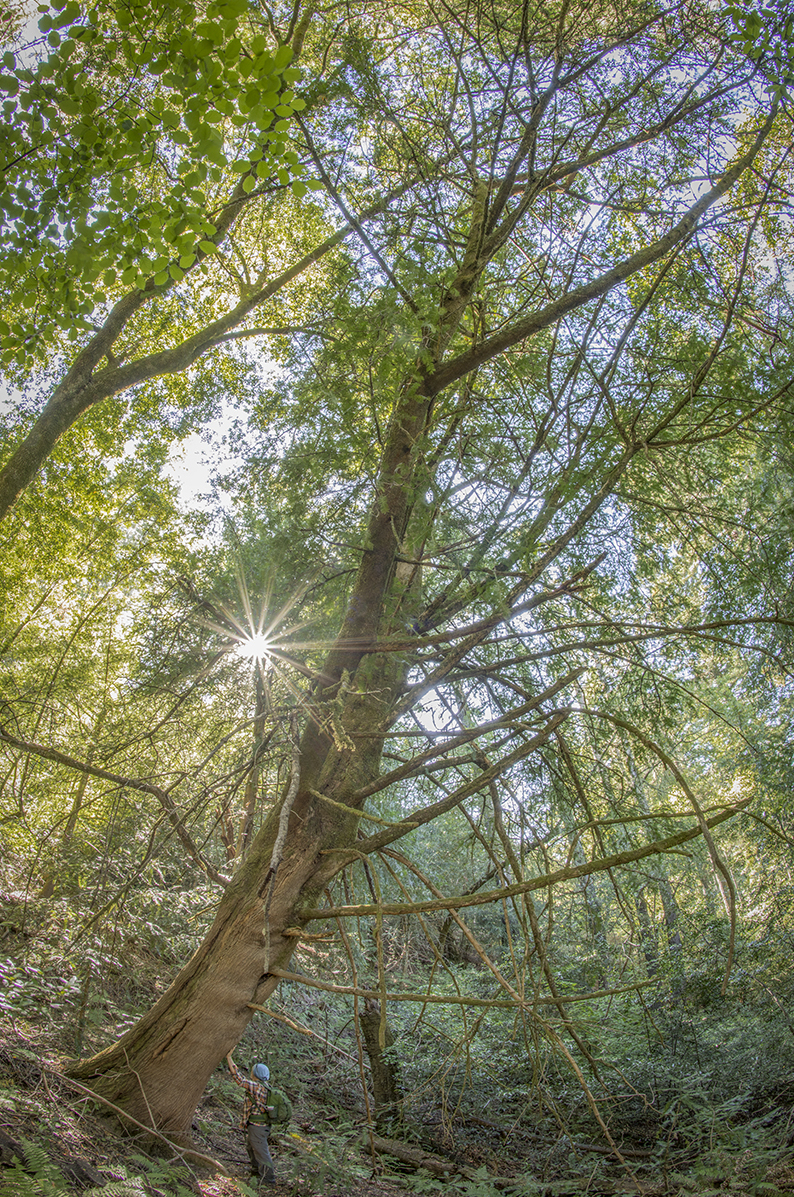
A champion size California torreya in Samuel Taylor State Park, north of San Francisco (2022). For scale, see the person touching the tree.

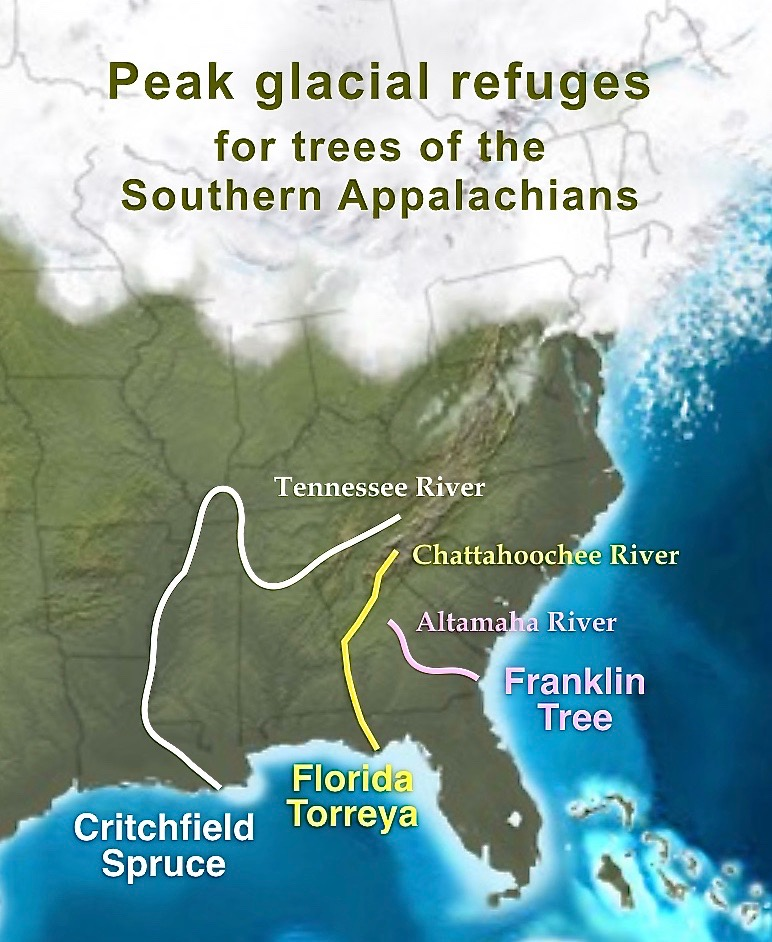
Peak glacial refuges and their famous relict trees, near river-system outlets in eastern North America. Critchfield Spruce went extinct before botanical explorers arrived. Florida torreya is critically endangered. The Franklin Tree (Franklinia alatamaha) went extinct in the wild soon after samples were collected and propagated in Philadelphia, PA.

Torreya taxifolia is a member of an ancient genus at least 160 million years old. Fossil evidence indicates genus Torreya was widely distributed across the Northern Hemisphere beginning in the Jurassic period and as recently as the Pliocene. Like other globally disjunct genera of the Arcto-Tertiary Geoflora, Torreya was forced southward during the cooling of the Plio-Pleistocene epochs. In North America, the genus found refuge as numerous, but small and isolated, populations in California's coastal mountains and the west slope of the Sierras, which still constitute the native range of Torreya californica. Glacial advance was far greater on the eastern side of North America. But there, no mountains offered refuge as far south as the genus apparently needed to retreat. Hence, the only refuge that maintained Torreya through the coldest episodes of the Pleistocene yet also during the warming Holocene were ravines along the east shore of the Apalachicola River of northern Florida. Today, this location entails the entirety of the native range of Torreya taxifolia, thus making it a paleoendemic.

Each of the U.S. Fish and Wildlife Service official documents pertaining to Torreya taxifolia portrays this species as a glacial relict. The 1984 official listing of the species as endangered included this description:

"The Florida torreya and other endemics of the Apalachicola River system have received much attention from scientists and local residents. The relictual nature of this area accounts for the presence of many unique species (James, 1967). During recent glaciations, species migrated southward by way of the Apalachicola River system, which served as a refugium during cooling periods. The Apalachicola River is the only Deep River system that has its headwaters in the southern Appalachian Mountains. With the receding of the glaciers, cool moist conditions persisted on the bluffs and ravines of the Apalachicola River after climatic change rendered the surrounding area much drier and warmer."

The initial recovery plan in 1986 gave more details on the prehistory, stating, "Torreya is a genus of four or five species from Florida and Georgia, California, China, and Japan. The present geographic distribution of the genus is similar to the distributions of several other plant genera. The distributions, together with fossil evidence, suggest that these genera had wide distributions during the Tertiary Period that were subsequently reduced by climatic changes during the Quaternary (James 1961, Delcourt and Delcourt 1975)."

The most recent (2020) recovery plan update states, "Based on fossil records, we can speculate that the geographical range of T. taxifolia included North Carolina and perhaps, it was forced south by glaciers, and when they retreated, it became isolated in small areas of the southeastern United States." This 2020 federal document describes the fossil history in this way: "Fossil records of Torreya are limited to seeds, leaves, and secondary wood of the Upper Cretaceous (Boeshore and Gray 1936, Chaney 1950). The records indicated that the distribution of the genus in past geological times was much wider than the present distribution. A fossil named T. antigua, which has some characteristics in common with T. taxifolia and T. californica, was described from the Mid-Cretaceous of North Carolina and was also collected from the near MacBride's Ford, Georgia (Boeshore and Gray 1936)."

Fossil pollen of genus Torreya and other genera within Taxaceae is generally deemed indistinguishable, one from another, and also from genera within families Taxodiaceae and Cupressaceae. Therefore, it is difficult to support past presence or absence of such genera in geographic locales where macrofossil plant material is rare or absent, even if substantial pollen (as in Quaternary bogs) is available. Nonetheless, because the Torreya genus entails sister species of a strongly disjunct distribution pattern of geographic ranges throughout the Northern Hemisphere, with macrofossil evidence at northerly latitudes during warm episodes of the Tertiary Period, it is clear that the eastern North American species of genus Torreya occupied more northerly habitats during many millions of years of history prior to the Quaternary glaciation.

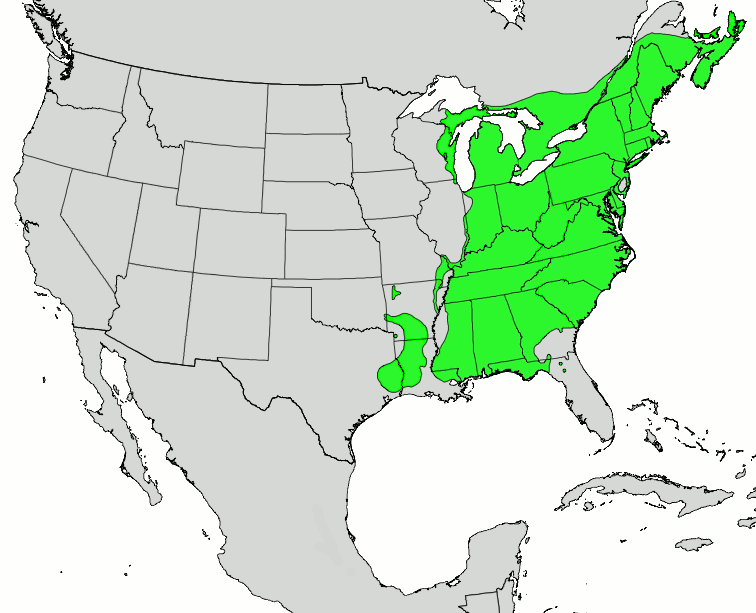
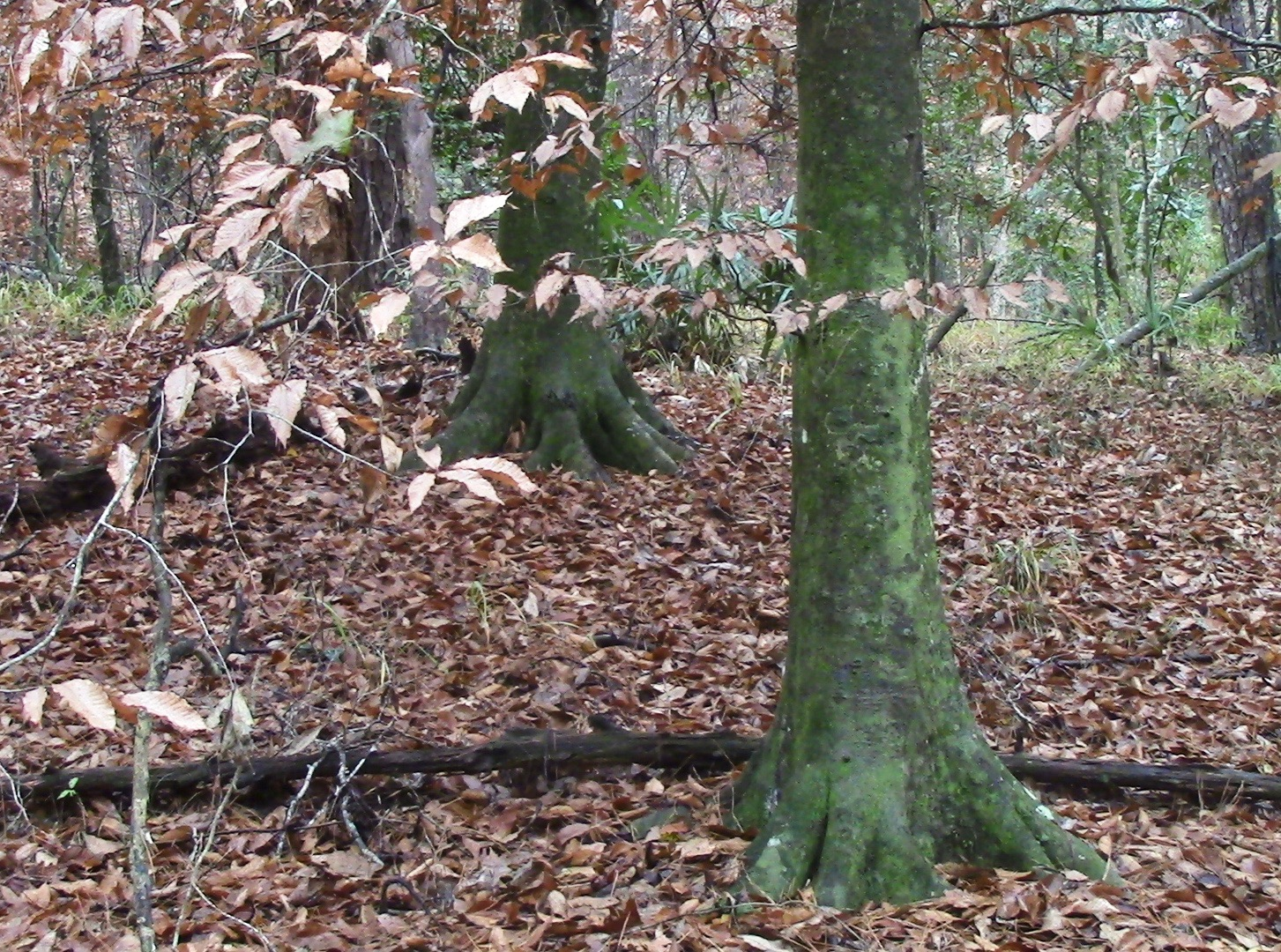
American beech, Fagus grandifolia, is in its southernmost range in Torreya State Park. In this December 2014 photo in the park, the papery brown leaves of a beech still cling to its branches.

The relictual character of the historically native range of this conifer species has been recognized for more than a century. The 1884 Annual Report of the Commissioner of Agriculture (USA) characterizes Torreya taxifolia (for which "Stinking Yew" and "Savin" are listed as common names): "No doubt the Torreya is a relic of a past epoch, when it may have had a wide range at the time when the elephant and mastodon were denizens of this country."

Botanist Henry C. Cowles visited the area in 1904 and his observations were quoted at length by two colleagues, John M. Coulter and W.J.G. Land in a 1905 paper in Botanical Gazette. Cowles observed that torreya in the wild, "were associated with a remarkable and somewhat extensive group of northern mesophytic plants, and the conclusion is irresistible that Torreya is a northern plant of the most pronounced mesophytic tendencies, and to be associated with such forms as the beech-maple-hemlock forms of our northern woods, our most mesophytic type of association."

== Ecology ==
=== Habitat ===
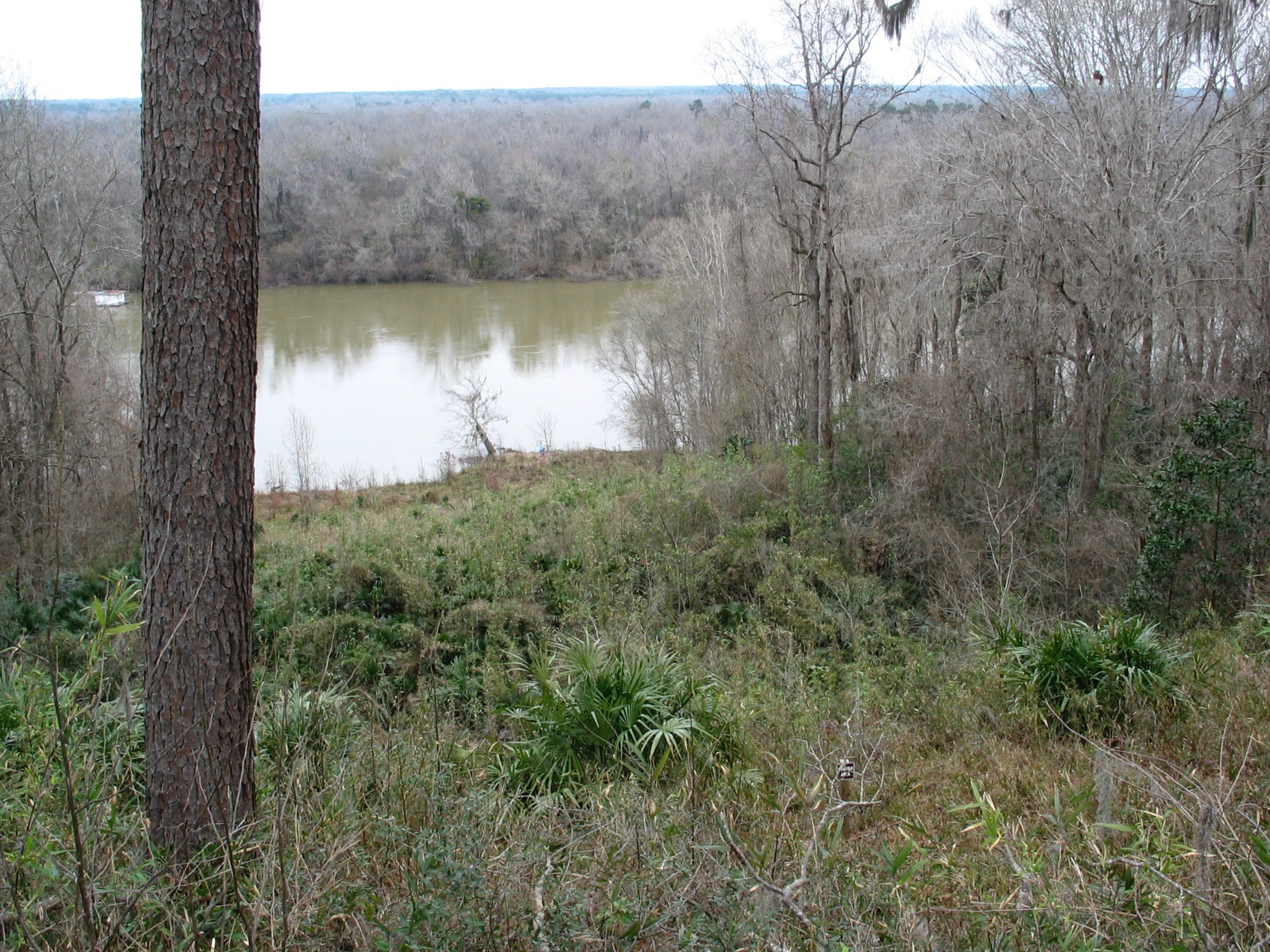
View of the Apalachicola River from the highlands of the east shore in Torreya State Park, February 2004.

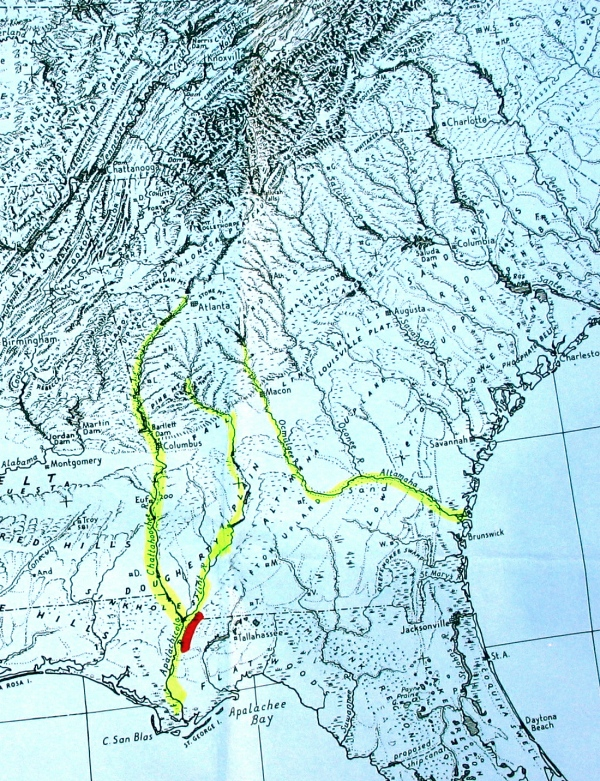
The native range of Florida torreya (orange) is on the east side of the Apalachicola River, just downstream of the junction of the Chattahoochee and Flint rivers. The downstream end of the Altamaha River is where the Franklinia tree was discovered.

Torreya taxifolia occurs along limestone bluffs of the eastern shore of the Apalachicola River in a region with a warm and humid climate, occasionally influenced in winter by cold waves from the north that dip temperatures below the freezing point. It grows mostly in the shade of wooded ravines and steep, north-facing slopes under a canopy of other mesic species requiring rich soils, characteristic of the ecological system known as "Southern Coastal Plain Mesic Slope Forest". Canopy tree species thus include Fagus grandifolia, Liriodendron tulipifera, Acer floridanum, Liquidambar styraciflua, Quercus alba, and occasionally pines (Pinus taeda, Pinus glabra). Often these woods are hung with vines (e.g. Smilax spp., Bignonia capreolata). Another rare conifer, Taxus floridana, occasionally grows with Torreya taxifolia. These ravines, known locally as "steepheads", have nearly permanent seeps.

The combination of subcanopy shade, a preference for north-facing slopes, and the nearly permanent seeps within the ravines suggest that Torreya taxifolia has already retrenched to the subhabitats within this glacial refugium that offer the coolest conditions during the extremes of summer heat.

Because the confined native range of Torreya taxifolia, which includes Torreya State Park, is a well known glacial refugium, the ecological conditions and plants that it associates with there do not provide the full picture of the habitat preferences of this species at this warming time of the Holocene. For this reason, the citizen advocacy group known as Torreya Guardians includes a page on their website titled "Historic Groves of Torreya Trees: Long-Term Experiments in Assisted Migration." "Naturalized groves" is the highest category listed, followed by "mature trees producing seeds" and "mature trees not producing seeds." As of 2022, 14 sites of historic groves are listed, described, mapped, and linked, along with six academic papers that describe the importance of such groves for assessing the viability of assisted migration as climate warms. The northernmost grove of horticulturally planted Torreya taxifolia that produces seeds is in Cleveland, Ohio.

=== Seed dispersal ===
Squirrels are abundant short-distance dispersers of the large seed of Torreya taxifolia today. The 1986 recovery plan (page 3) states that at Maclay Gardens (a horticultural planting in Tallahassee, Florida), "gray squirrels gather the seeds as soon as the arils turn purplish." But larger dispersers may have once carried seeds in their guts and deposited them in feces at longer distances from the parent tree.

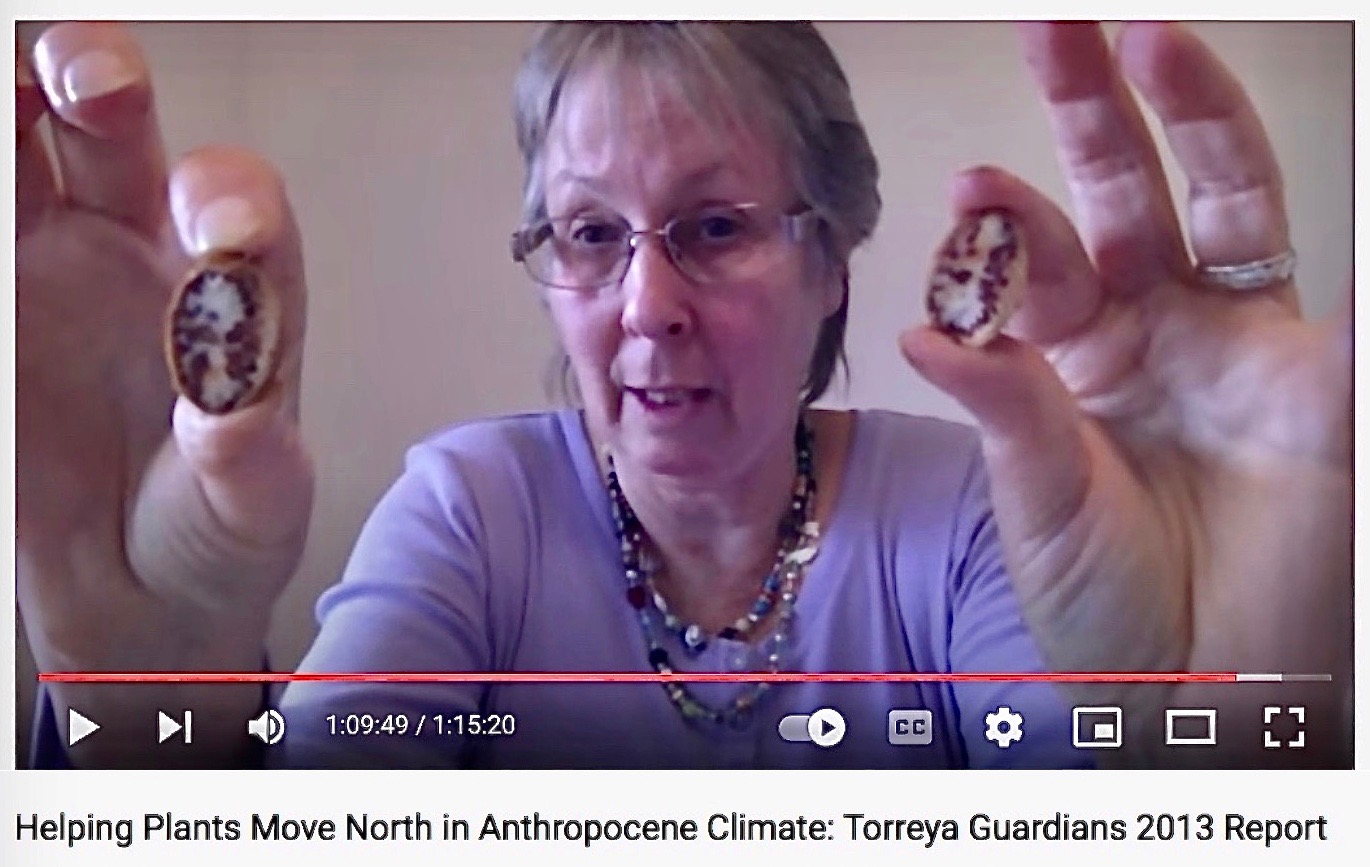
Connie Barlow showing the inside of a cut ripe seed of Torreya taxifolia in her first video for Torreya Guardians, November 2013.

In her 2001 book, The Ghosts of Evolution, Connie Barlow suggested that T. taxifolia may be an evolutionary anachronism similar to the Osage orange (Maclura pomifera) and Kentucky coffeetree (Gymnocladus dioicus), which are thought to have been dispersed by now-extinct megafauna, such as the mastodon. Barlow suggested that the original seed disperser of Torreya might have been a now-extinct large tortoise. In the Winter 2004/2005 issue of Wild Earth magazine, an article by Barlow and Paul S. Martin titled "Bring Torreya taxifolia North — Now" offered another possible cause of dispersal problems as the glaciers retreated: extirpation of local squirrels by newly arrived Paleo-Indians inhabiting the riverside habitat and possibly also setting fires destructive of the species. Barlow's hypothesis later shifted to an intrinsic topographical barrier: perhaps "the large-seed of Torreya (which is sometimes capable of floating for several days) easily caught a fast and obstacle-free river ride southward from the Appalachian Mountains by way of the Chattahoochee River at the onset of cooling during the Pliocene or Pleistocene. But there was no river-flow way to return north during any of the interglacial warmings."

== Extinction threats ==
T. taxifolia became one of the first federally listed endangered plant species in the United States in 1984. The IUCN has listed the species as critically endangered since 1998. It is considered "the rarest conifer in North America."

The Center for Plant Conservation describes Florida torreya as "one of the rarest conifers in the world," reporting that in the mid-twentieth century it suffered a catastrophic decline, as all reproductive age trees died. Approximately 0.3% of the original population remains, mostly as resprouting stems. The continuing threats are "changes in hydrology, forest structure, heavy browsing by deer, loss of reproduction capability, as well as dieback from fungal disease." Staff of the Atlanta Botanical Garden wrote in 2022 that "populations have declined from nearly 700,000 trees to around 700 trees today." The dieback is alarming not only for its speed and severity. Prior to its decline, "T. taxifolia was estimated to be the seventh most abundant tree species within the Apalachicola Bluffs region."

In its most recent (2020) update to the Florida torreya recovery plan, the United States Fish and Wildlife Service concluded that the naturally occurring population was continuing to decrease, with little to no reproduction observed and no recruitment in its wild habitat along ravine slopes on the eastern bank of the Apalachicola River. The remaining trees were still impacted by "disease, herbivory, and deer rub, along with other confounding factors." The agency reported that the ongoing decline of torreya numbers and health was exacerbated in 2018 when the entire native range of the species took a direct hit from the Category 5 Hurricane Michael. The agency reported an estimated 80–90% loss of canopy tree cover, causing direct kills of some torreya while exposing others to injurious levels of sunlight and heat.

=== Vulnerabilities of restricted range size ===
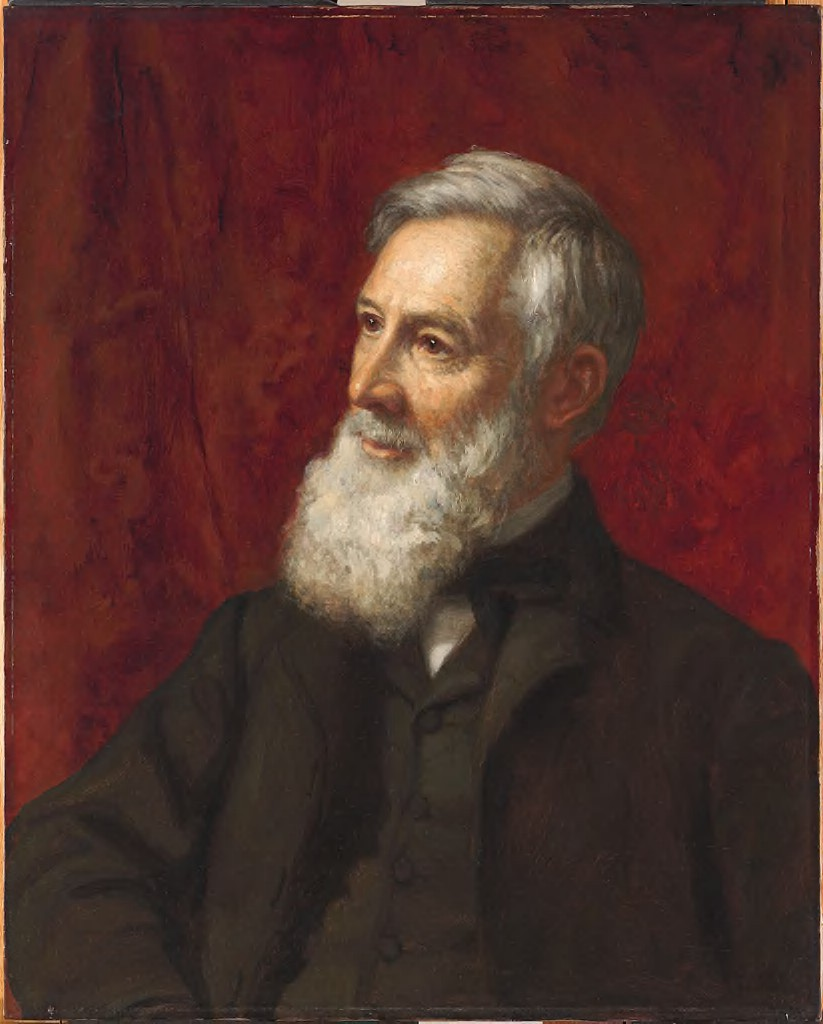
Portrait of Asa Gray (1810–1888), by George P. A. Healy

The focus of concern for the future of Torreya taxifolia has shifted through time. The exceptionally small scale of its native range, however, has always been a primary concern.

Restricted range and human overuse were named as primary threats by Harvard botanist Asa Gray in the report of his self-described "pilgrimage" to the species in the spring of 1875. Fresh seedlings and the species' propensity to regrow new stems from the same rootstock were noted by him as a hedge against extinction:

"Seedlings and young trees are not uncommon, and some old stumps were sprouting from the base, in the manner of Californian Redwood. So this species may be expected to endure, unless these bluffs should be wantonly deforested — against which their distance from the river and the steepness of the ground offer some protection. But any species of very restricted range may be said to hold its existence by a precarious tenure."

A. W. Chapman in 1885 pointed to human overharvesting "for posts, shingles, and other exposed constructions" of the extremely durable wood as the primary threat. In the 1830s big trees had been so abundant that their trunks were sawn into planks and used to construct the village of Aspalaga Landing.

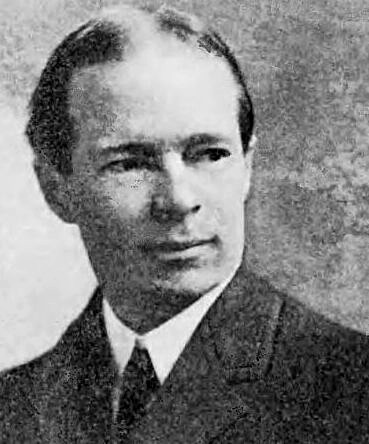
Henry C. Cowles (1869–1939), University of Chicago Botanist

As a new century began, there was still no mention of Torreya taxifolia decline by any threat other than humanity. Its relictual character still evoked strong interest. In a 1904 conference contribution, University of Chicago botanist Henry C. Cowles wrote,

"In these ravines, and especially on the northward-facing slopes, is to be found a mesophytic association of plants that is abundant far to the north, but which reaches its southern limit here.... It seems likely, then, that we should regard Torreya taxifolia as a northern mesophytic left stranded today only in Florida. It presumably is one of the plants that failed to follow up the last retreat of the Pleistocene ice, and is preserved here perhaps because of exceptionally favorable topographic conditions."

October 2018 brought a reminder of the inherent risks of an endangered plant endemic to only a very small range. As reported June 2019 in The Atlanta Journal-Constitution newspaper, in the spring of 2018 Atlanta Botanical Garden transplanted 700 Torreya taxifolia trees to Torreya State Park in Florida, "with noted Harvard biologist E. O. Wilson, 88, as a guest of honor. Then, Hurricane Michael destroyed the entire stand, dumping hardwoods on top of little saplings."

=== The die-off begins ===
Sometime between 1938 and 1962 it became clear that not only harvesting was reducing the remaining torreya trees to thin, resprouting stems. There was strong evidence of one or more above-ground pathogens that killed virtually all replacement stems not long after they had emerged from still-healthy rootstock. In a 1967 paper titled, "Stem and Needle Blight of Florida Torreya," a team of Florida plant pathologists described a "fungus disease contributing to a progressive state of decline which threatens the existence of the species both in its natural habitat and wherever it is grown." The team, led by S.A. Alfieri, included in their report a concise history of the unresolved nature of disease discovery and the speed of its spread.

Alfieri et al. presented that the first person to notice that Torreya taxifolia trees were dying in their wild habitat was an extension service forester in northern Florida, Lewis T. Nieland. He made his observation in 1938, but he did not write a formal paper about it. In that same year, Herman Kurz made a detailed study of torreya ecology, yet he remarked that there was no danger of the species vanishing from its habitat, so long as the human taking of stems could be kept in check. In 1954 Kurz and Robert K. Godfrey surveyed the population and noticed no evidence of decline by any stem-killing pathogen.

Eight years later, Kurz and Godfrey surveyed the species again — and reversed their conclusion. Their 1962 report, published as a "Letter" in the journal Science, offered a dire prediction: "Its extinction is well-nigh an accomplished fact." What they saw instead of healthy groves were "skeleton trunks, a few of which have abortive sprouts at their bases." As to the identity of the pathogen, they suggested, "apparently a fungal disease of the stems. We know nothing more than that."

=== The role of pathogens in the die-off ===
The 1967 article by S. A. Alfieri Jr. et al, as summarized in the previous section, became a turning point in conservation concern for Florida torreya. Henceforth, conservation initiatives focused on determining why disease had killed virtually all the older stems, the identities of the disease agent (or agents), and how to proceed with species rehabilitation.

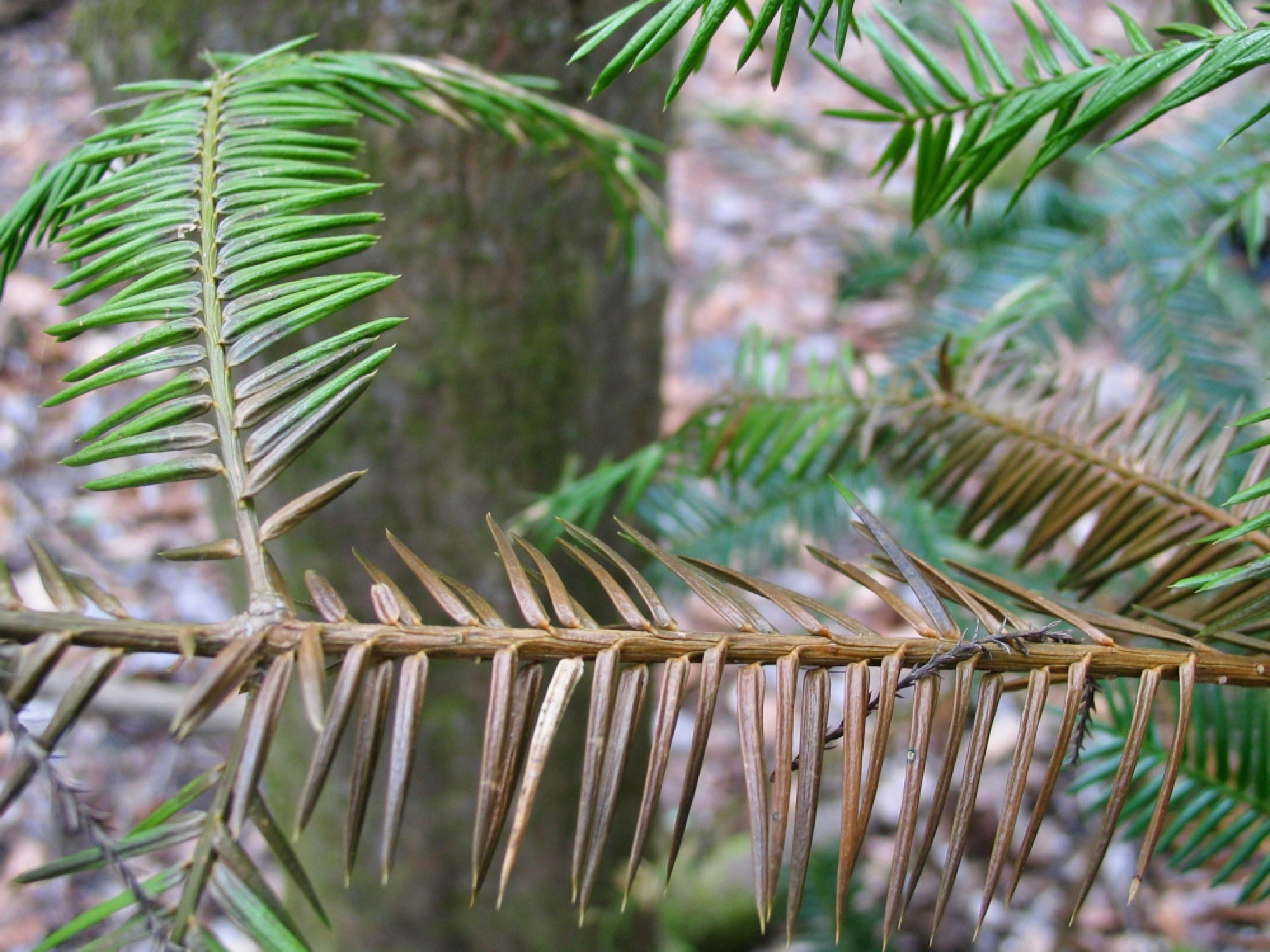
Diseased branch of a wild Torreya taxifolia, Torreya State Park, Florida (2004).

Alfieri, with additional colleagues, continued studies of Torreya pathogens well into the 1980s. His 1987 pathology team identified a half-dozen "associated microorganisms," mostly fungi. The team reported that since 1962, "natural populations have drastically diminished for reasons not fully understood. No reproduction from seed is taking place and only stump sprouts can be found in native areas." The canker disease had also appeared in horticultural specimens planted outside the native range, such as in the University of Florida campus in Gainesville and in the Alfred B. Maclay Gardens State Park in Tallahassee.

An achievement in disease understanding was offered by the team in their 1987 paper: "the first documented report of pathogenicity." It was team member Nabih Elias El-Gholl who had made the initial discovery in 1985, now worked into a full report in this 1987 publication. The pathogen, Fusarium lateritium, is a kind of filamentous fungus that infected and killed torreya needles in laboratory experimentation. It has a global distribution and infects a variety of agricultural plants. Fusarium is a species-rich genus, and it is highlighted here because in 2011 its role in torreya pathology gained renewed attention as a lethal pathogen. At that time, the fungal agent was documented as the cause of stem cankers, and in 2013 it was given a new species name, Fusarium torreyae.

=== The role of habitat deterioration in the die-off ===
Following the 1984 listing of Torreya taxifolia as federally endangered, the first recovery plan (1986) included a list of numerous fungal species "associated with diseases" affecting this species. No pathogen was presented as the dominant or sole cause of the sudden and extreme die-off of virtually all the reproductively mature stems.

Fusarium genus was included in the list, though linked with "root rot" rather than needle necrosis as the disease symptom. The recovery plan, however, suggested that pathogens may be the "proximate causes," with "environmental factors" entailing the ultimate cause or causes:

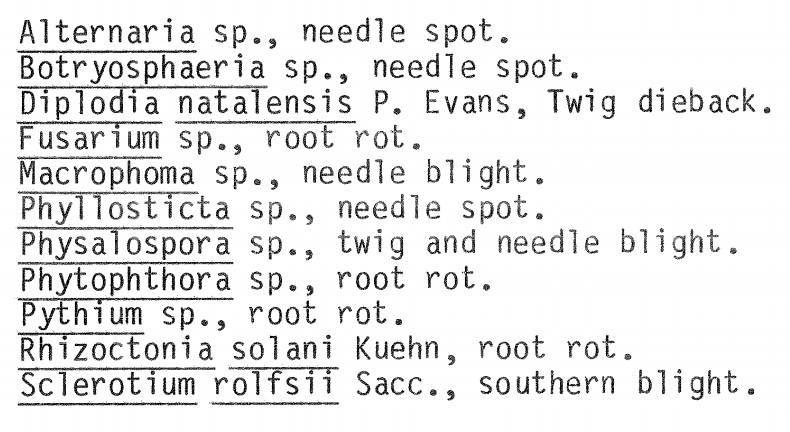
Fungal pathogens associated with Torreya taxifolia, listed in the 1986 recovery plan, US Fish and Wildlife Service.

"The occurrence of multiple fungi, some of them known to be soil inhabitants and opportunistic pathogens of several plant species, suggests that the fungal infections are merely symptoms of another underlying cause of decline" (page 6). "The decline of Torreya taxifolia in its native habitat may ultimately be due to environmental factors that stressed the trees, including alteration of its forest habitat, alteration of vegetation above the ravines it inhabits, alteration of water seepage into the ravines, or droughts. The proximate causes of the decline are an assortment of fungal infections, resulting in stem cankers, stem and leaf blight, and possibly other problems. The decline has affected all wild Florida torreya trees (Godfrey and Kurz 1962) and possibly all cultivated trees" (page 2).

The recovery plan put environmental deterioration into the context of the geological time scale of climate change:

"The basic limiting factor of Florida torreya is its restricted geographic range and habitat, rendering the species vulnerable to human disturbance of its habitat and to natural factors, such as climate change, which are likely to be felt by all of the populations.... The decline has been so great that few if any seed-bearing trees exist in the wild, making recovery of the populations through natural sexual reproduction impossible" (page 5). "It is possible that relatively minor human alterations of the habitat may seriously affect torreya; it is possible that the present-day physical environment of the Apalachicola bluffs and ravines is only marginally suitable to Florida torreya. The species may be restricted to the area because it failed to migrate northward at the end of the Pleistocene" (page 6).

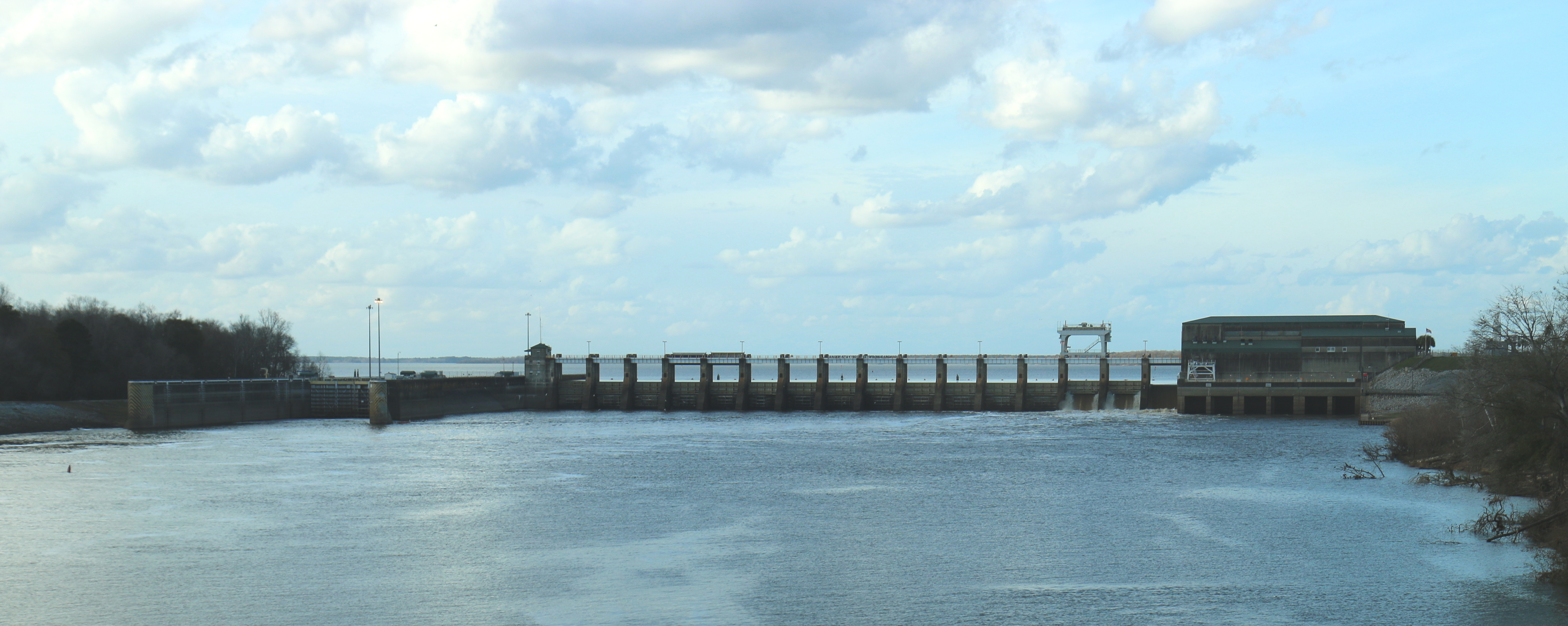
Jim Woodruff Dam in 2017

Noting that torreya "appears to occupy sites where a steady supply of moisture is available from seepage, and where it is shady in the summer" (page 6), the plan then offered possible human factors that may have deteriorated those habitat conditions. "Alteration of the pine forests on uplands above the ravines" was one possible factor. Logging within the ravines was also noted. Ravine temperatures could have been affected by "construction of the Jim Woodruff Dam, completed in 1956."

The Jim Woodruff Dam was one human alteration in the landscape for which quantitative data was available and could be assessed. Mark W. Schwartz would be the scientist to make that evaluation. But first, he would join with Rob Nicholson of Harvard's Arnold Arboretum, to undertake the "first objective" of the federal recovery plan: to gather cuttings from the remaining wild specimens in the native range in order "to produce a genetically diverse collection of sexually mature, reasonably healthy trees in cultivation to preserve a representative gene pool to serve as stock for possible reintroduction into the native habitat" — which itself would begin only "when there is reason to believe that the trees would survive to maturity" (page 8).

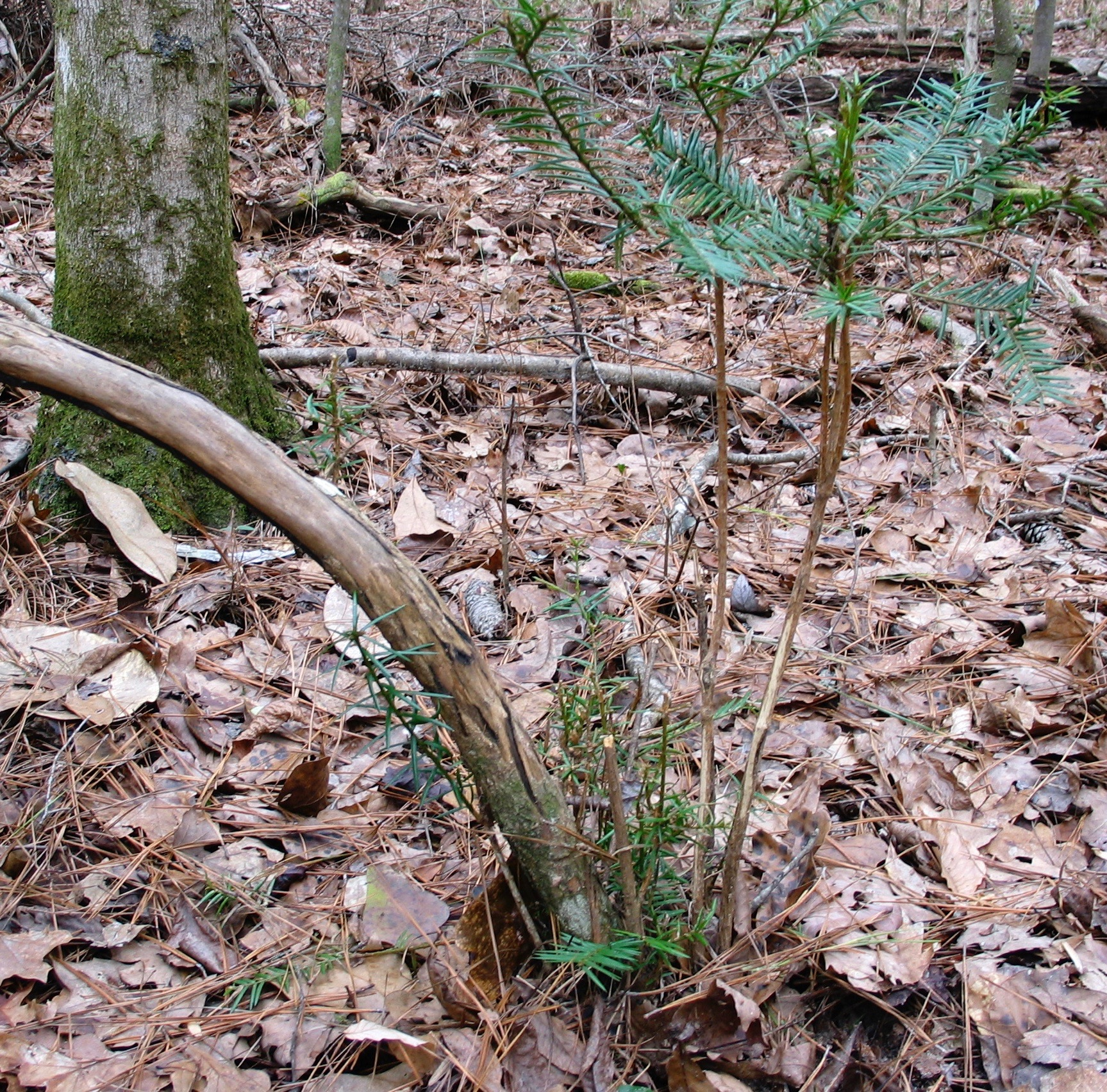
Herbivore damage on resprouting torreya at Torreya State Park, 2004

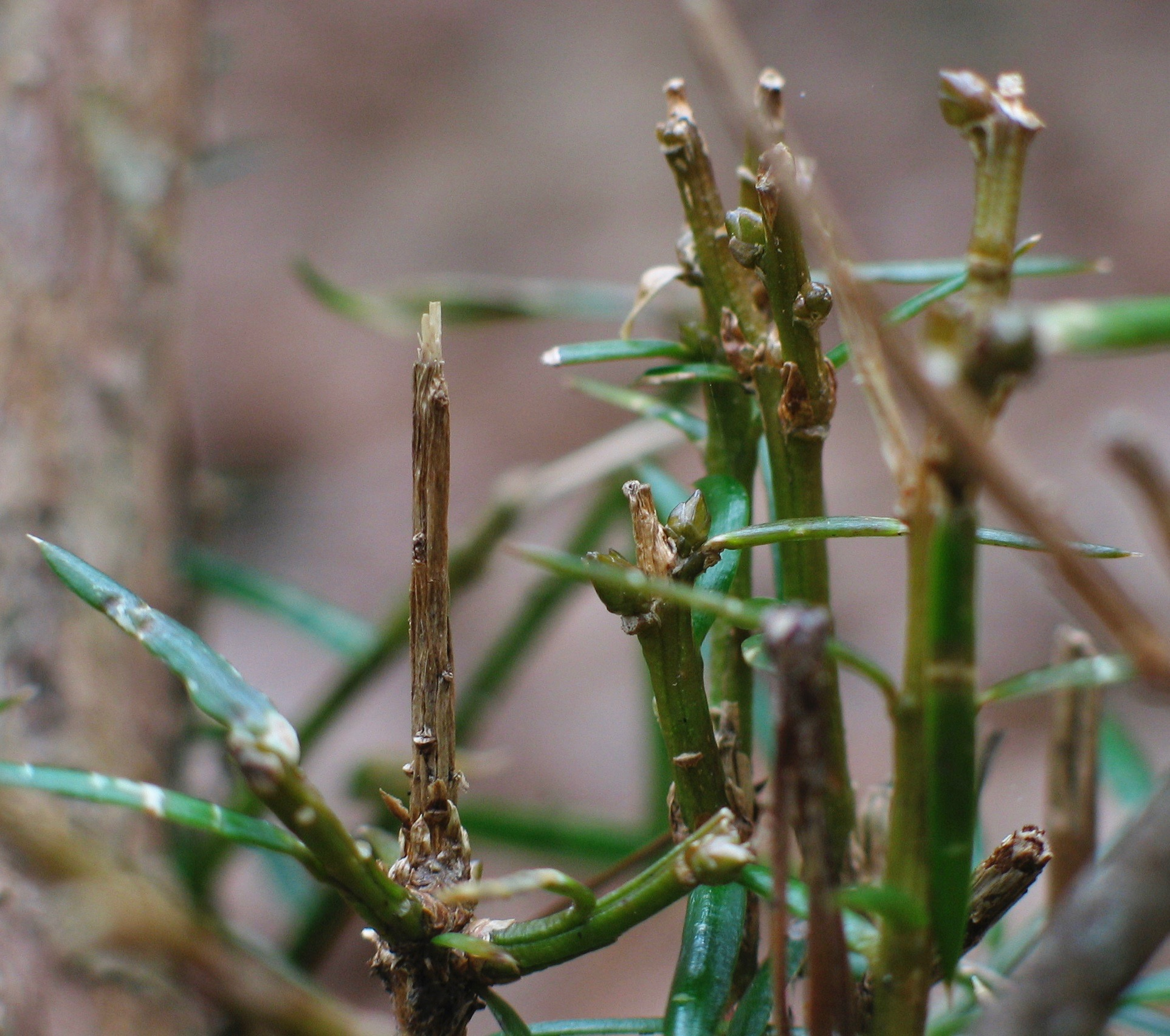
Close-up of herbivore damage.

With more than 2,000 branchlets cut from the wild and being rooted in facilities at Arnold Arboretum and other institutions, Mark Schwartz joined with Sharon M Hermann in the field to officially catalog "The Continuing Population Decline of Torreya taxifolia", which was published in 1993. In 1995 Schwartz and Hermann teamed with Cristoph S. Vogel in publishing the results of their field and lab work in assessing a number of environmental variables that could have stressed the torreya population enough to induce one or more pathogens to become lethal. The team posed and assessed a total of eight hypotheses for the decline: three possible "biotic agents" and five possible "abiotic triggers."

The "abiotic triggers" assessed were: (1) Water stress, (2) Microclimatic warming, (3) Regional warming, (4) Hydrologic change, and (5) Fire suppression. The team documented that both regional drought and dam construction were "coincident with the timing of the decline," but such triggers were not, in their view, commensurate with the scale of torreya die-off: "While we cannot rule out the possibility that moisture, temperature or soil nutrient stress contributed to inciting disease in T. taxifolia, the argument that one of these concurrent environmental changes single-handedly incited a decline is very weak." The team did acknowledge, in Table 2, that, "If T. taxifolia is limited by warm temperatures, a slight increase in temperature may render it susceptible to native pathogens. This species may be an early casualty of global warming."

Because the team focus and expertise was ecological rather than pathological, their assessment of the three hypotheses for "biotic agent" causes relied on existing pathological publications rather than new research of their own. Their assessment was negative as to: (1) Introduced pathogen, (2) Pathogen vectors (e.g., deer antler rubbing), and (3) Fungal pathogens as epiphenomenon (that is, initially virulent but becoming weak or absent). However, the team did acknowledge that "most catastrophic declines have involved exotic pathogen" and therefore an as-yet "unknown pathogen" could ultimately be determined as the cause.

A new team was assembled by Mark W. Schwartz, aimed at using models to predict the time of future extinction in the wild. Ecological details from additional field experience were included in their 2001 paper, and these offered context for understanding the scope of the initial wave of tree die-off and torreya's response:

"The population crash of the 1950s appears to have killed all wild adults, leaving a current population of solely juvenile (nonreproductive) trees. Unlike the American chestnut (Castanea dentata), in which many adult trees died back to the ground but survived as individuals, it appears that adult torreya trees died during the population crash. Existing individuals are not associated with dead stumps (Schwartz & Hermann 1993b). Thus, extant trees were presumably present as seeds or seedlings at the time of the decline.... Currently, most wild T. taxifolia grows as small trees with multiple stems arising from a main root axis. Secondary stems, alternately termed epicormic shoots, coppice shoots or aerial suckers (Jenik 1994) arise as basal sprouts either from low on the main stem or the root collar."

Summarizing published pathogen studies, the team concluded "Despite unsuccessful attempts to isolate the disease agent, no other cause of the decline has been documented (Schwartz & Hermann 1993b)." As well, "Nothing in our demographic data suggests recovery of Torreya taxifolia. We have not observed any seed production in the wild, and we are not aware of any anecdotal reports of seed production in the wild during the past 25 years."

=== Focus on a stem canker fungus ===
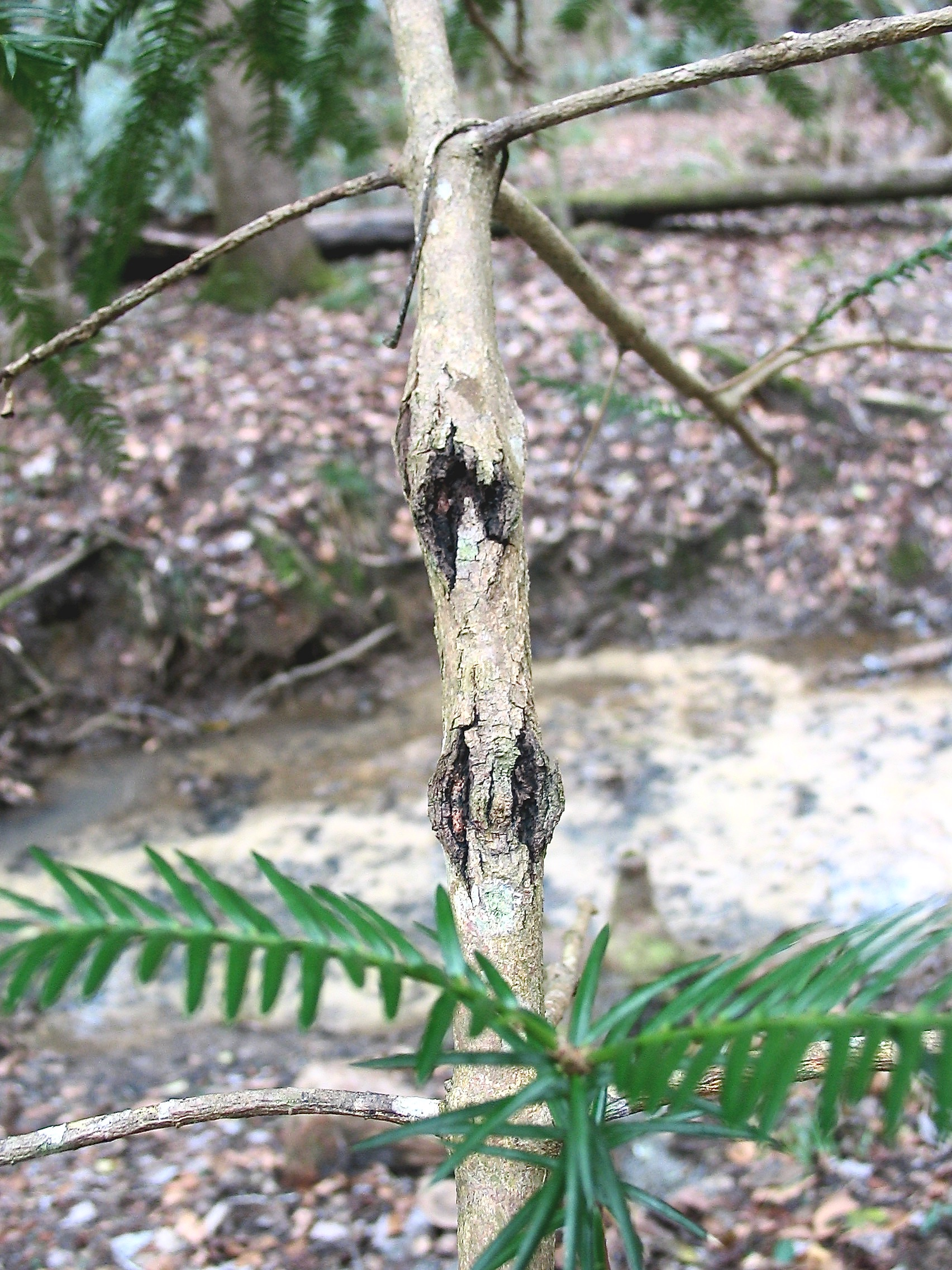
Cankers on Florida torreya stem, Torreya State Park, 2004.

In 2010, a forest pathologist at the University of Florida, Jason A. Smith, along with his graduate assistant, Aaron Trulock, published a Cooperative Extension Service "fact sheet" on Florida torreya that reported their discovery of the fungal cause of stem cankers. Resolution of the canker cause was crucial, as it was stem death (rather than periodic leaf death) that proved lethal to above-ground portions of torreya. Citing earlier work by Mark W. Schwartz, they framed the importance of their canker pathogen discovery: "The rapid nature of the decline during the period of 1938 to 1945 and numerous observations of disease symptoms provides ample evidence that a pathogen, possibly non-native, was involved."

In 2011, Smith led a team of pathologists (in collaboration with research staff at Torreya State Park and Atlanta Botanical Garden) in publishing findings that pointed to a "novel Fusarium species" as the agent of the ongoing demise of resprout stems: "In surveys of eight Florida torreya sites, cankers were present on all dead trees and 71 to 100% of living trees, suggesting that a fungal pathogen might be the causal agent." The team used techniques of analysis that were unavailable in the 1980s when the Alfieri team probed for the identities of disease agents. Discovery of the cankers offered a foundation for moving ahead with species recovery because,

"Current efforts to manage this endangered species have been hindered by a lack of understanding of the current and historic causes of disease of Florida torreya. As a result, various agencies have taken different approaches to manage Florida torreya depending on which cause the decline is attributed to."

In 2013, Smith was second author of a journal article that documented the canker pathogen as "a genealogically exclusive, phylogenetically distinct species representing one of the earliest divergences within the Gibberella clade of Fusarium." The team wrote of the problems of isolating, documenting, and distinguishing the many disease-causing forms of this genus, studied primarily as agricultural pests:

"The identification of F. torreyae as F. lateritium by El-Gholl (El-Gholl 1985) and subsequent confirmation by Paul E. Nelson (D. Geiser pers comm) illustrate the daunting challenge presented by overly broad morphological concepts of fusaria, especially when applied to species that produce only sporodochial conidia. We speculate that the reported needle blight of Florida torreya induced by F. lateritium in a pathogenicity experiment (Alfieri et al. 1987) also can be attributed to F. torreyae; however, no isolate from this study was accessioned so the identity of this pathogen cannot be verified.

Jason Smith was also a coauthor of a 2016 paper that reported closest relatives of the novel Fusarium torreyae. The team wrote, "Molecular clock estimates place the divergence of the FTOSC in the mid-Eocene, 40 Mya (O'Donnell et al. 2013), but it remains an open question whether this clade first evolved in the Old or New World. Furthermore, it remains to be determined whether F. torreyae is native to North America and restricted to T. taxifolia."

Also in 2016, another paper was published that linked a globally distributed Fusarium type to the sudden outbreak of disease in commercial orchards of an Asian species of genus Torreya. The five coauthors wrote, "To our knowledge, this is the first report of Torreya grandis crown and root rot caused by fungus belonging to the F. oxysporum species complex worldwide. Further work is needed to determine the clade of F. oxysporum to which the isolates pathogenic to T. grandis belong." In 2023, an outbreak of root rot disease in Chinese orchards of Torreya grandis was attributed to another kind of Fusarium: "To the best of our knowledge, this is the first report of F. fujikuroi causing root rot of T. grandis in China. Both papers were short, and no mention was made of the possibility of a non-native source.

Documentation of Fusarium torreyae associated with an entirely different host species was published in 2023. Researchers confirmed a total of five Fusarium species associated with citrus trees plagued by the globally problematic Citrus greening disease in the Gainesville area of Florida. One of the five species was identified as Fusarium torreyae. There was, however, no discernment as to which of the fungal species may have been pathogenic, which benign or even mutualistic, and whether host plant stress levels induced different behaviors. Another paper in 2023 reported that Fusarium lateritium associated with maize "exhibited antifungal activities against Penicillium digitatum."

=== Plant and seed microbiomes as context ===
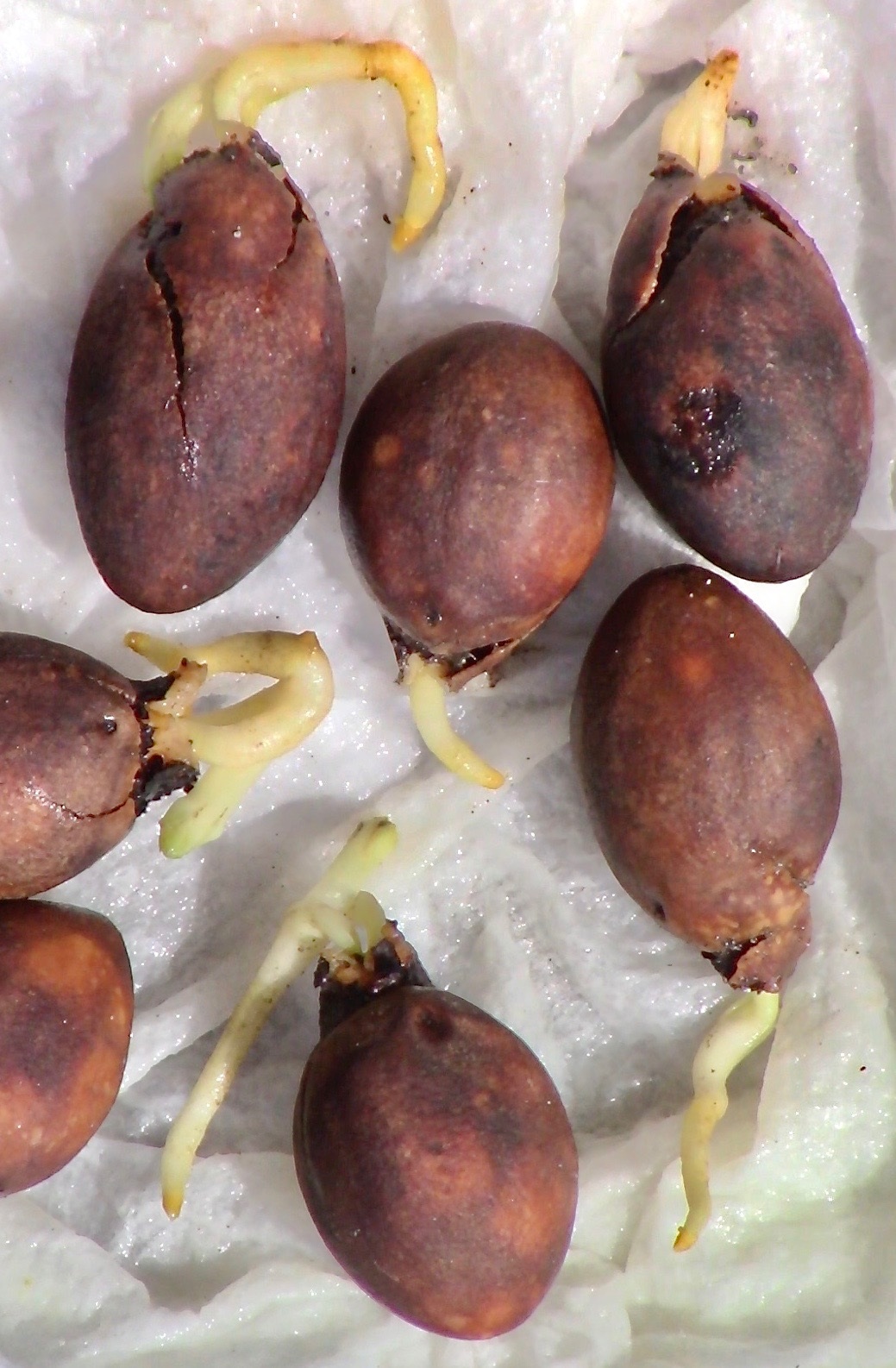
Seeds of Torreya taxifolia require two or more winter stratification periods before they will germinate.

The presumption that a microbial fungus found in association with tissues in a plant is probably a pathogen was turned aside beginning around 2015. Agricultural researchers began to document beneficial relations of fungal types consistently found within the tissues of commercially important plants. Such endophytes, especially when found within the tissues of developing seeds, are very likely to coexist with their host in mutualistic ways. The fungus benefits by dispersing via seed rather than air- or water-borne spore. In turn, such endophytes offer germination support and/or production of metabolites that repel other fungal species or bacteria from attacking a germinating seed. This facet of the plant microbiome came to be known as the seed microbiome. In 2025, the "tree microbiome" was presented in an article in the journal Nature. Microbial symbionts were routinely found in the wood of healthy trees, with symbiont identities varying not only between tree species but also whether located in the sapwood or the deep heartwood.

As of 2025, no studies have been published as to whether Fusarium torreyae found within Torreya taxifolia tissues (including seeds) may be providing host benefits in environmentally favorable conditions. However, a 2021 paper listed genus Fusarium as one of the leading mutualistic fungal types taking up residence in seeds, stems, and roots of 17 agricultural crops whose tissue microbiomes were documented. The authors called for "a paradigm shift" in moving away from the "traditional" presumption that plants acquire their fungal mutualists from the soil to the new understanding that coevolved partners are transported within the seeds themselves. A 2022 article on this species by staff at the Atlanta Botanical Garden stated, "Potential causes include fungal diseases and climate change."

None of the recent endophytic fungi papers were cited in the most recent update of the recovery plan for Florida Torreya, 2020. The update did elevate the significance of the canker disease and how that, in turn, increased the risks not only of assisted migration of the species northward, but of using ex situ plantings of any sort and anywhere for safeguarding the genetic diversity of the tree. Although there was as yet no peer-reviewed science that could be cited in the plan to reinforce current policies against northward plantings, personal communications by a lead staff person of Atlanta Botanical Garden (ABG) were referenced in the plan's statement on risks:

"Recent surveys of T. taxifolia outplantings in northern Georgia and North Carolina natural areas in 2020 by staff at ABG have found cankers formed by fungal infections on the T. taxifolia trees, and on other species of trees surrounding T. taxifolia, including Tsuga caroliniana (E. Coffey, ABG, 6/10/2020, review). The identity of these fungal infections remains to be confirmed, but these observations indicate there is some risk of Fusarium torreyae being transported with transplanted T. taxifolia to the southern Appalachian Mountains, and the fungus moving onto other threatened species of trees."

Even so, the 2020 recovery plan update maintains that the cause or causes of Florida torreya's slide toward extinction (both proximate and ultimate causes) are still unresolved:

"It is extremely vulnerable because of its limited range, its low population number, rarity of habitat, and threats. The main threat for this species decline is still not well understood, even though considerable research and management activities have been and are presently conducted on this species. The loss of T. taxifolia is thought to have primarily been a result of fungal pathogens during the 1950s and 1960s, and/ or a combination of environmental stress and native pathogens, but studies have yet to provide an explanation for this species' decline."

The most recent U.S. government document pertaining to Torreya taxifolia official policy was published September 2021. It was a response to a "Petition to Downlist Florida Torreya" by Torreya Guardians founder Connie Barlow, which the agency received December 2019. Page 8 of the decision document states:

"The primary decline in species abundance is thought to have resulted from fungal pathogens during the 1950s and 1960s, and/or a combination of environmental stress and native pathogens, but studies have yet to provide an explanation. As a result, the main threat for this species' decline is still not well understood, even though considerable research and management activities have been and are presently conducted on this species."

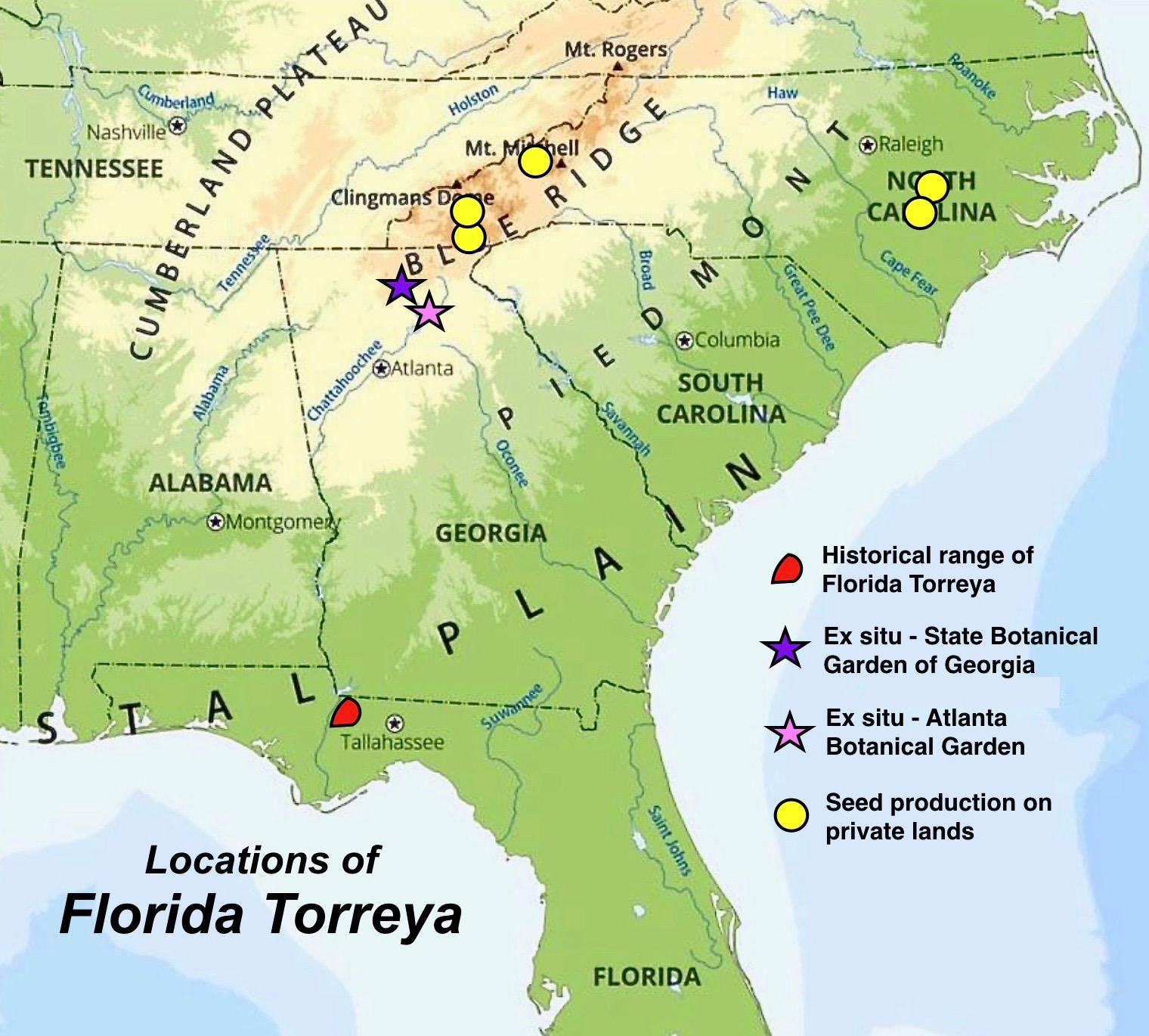
Seed production in northward plantings of Florida torreya.

In June 2025, the Torreya Guardians website posted a lengthy new webpage, titled "Applying the Plant and Seed Microbiome Paradigms to the Endangered Florida Torreya tree." A 54-page pdf of the new material was also posted online and on the ResearchGate page of its author, Connie Barlow. The document begins with the map shown at right and a description of the opportunity:

In contrast to the dire situation in its historical range in Florida, Torreya taxifolia is growing well more than two hundred miles northward. Two botanical gardens in Georgia established ex situ "genetic safeguarding" plantings in northern Georgia — where seed production has been ongoing for nearly two decades. Additionally, private plantings of Florida torreya (which are independent of the official endangered species program) are producing seeds in North Carolina at five sites.

The bulk of that document is a chronologically organized list (with excerpts) of published papers on plant and seed microbiomes, especially those that pertain to endophytic fungi of the Fusarium genus. The document ends with two pages of "Recommendations for the 2025 Recovery Plan Update," beginning with this: "Read and then reference the NEW PARADIGM papers excerpted here as the best available science for discerning whether Fusarium torreyae is more likely to be a mutualistic endophyte rather than a latent pathogen as long presumed."

== Conservation actions ==
=== Protect areas in species range ===
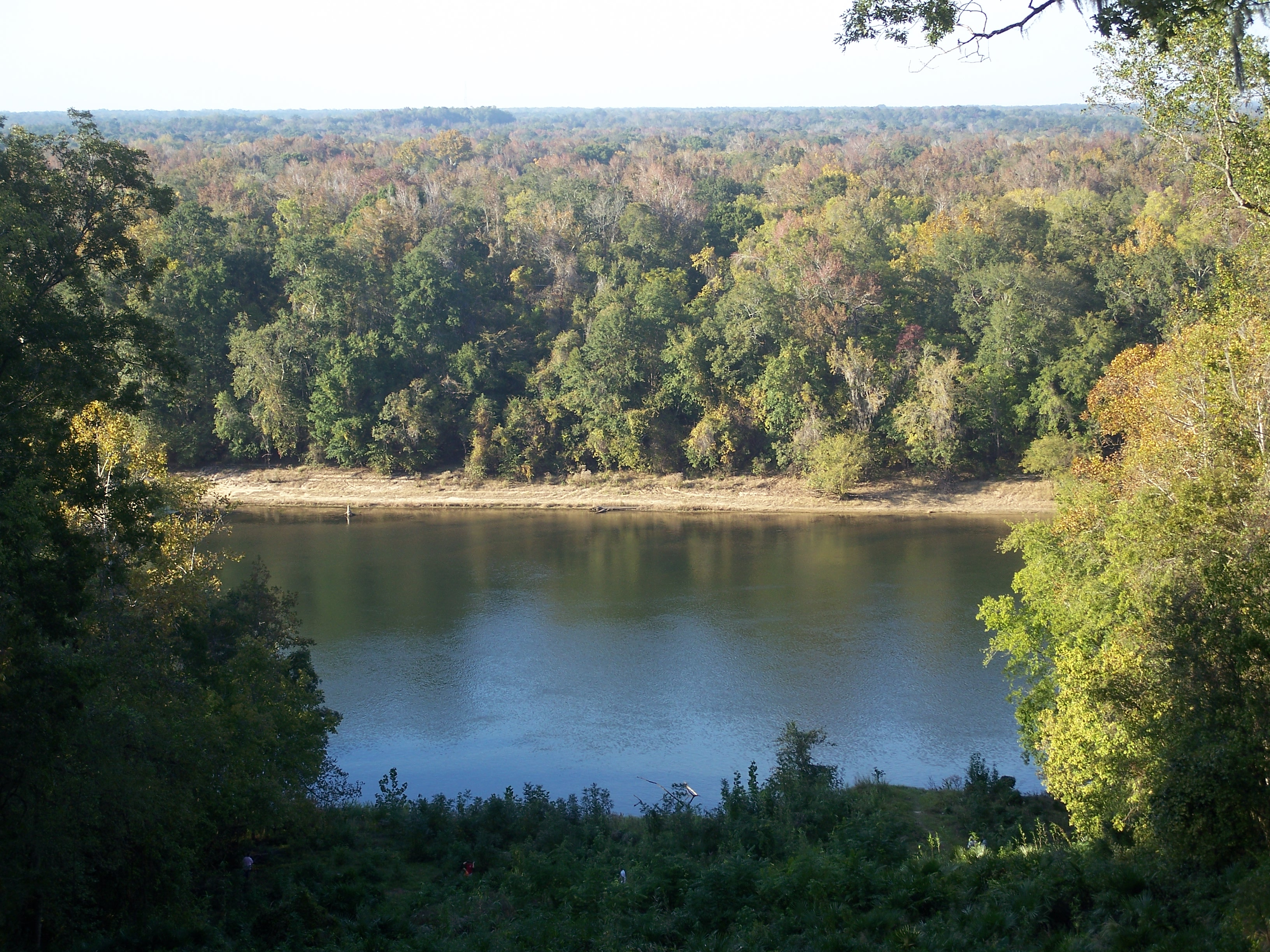
The Apalachicola River viewed from the bluffs next to Gregory House in Torreya State Park

Prior to the rather sudden and extreme die-off mid 20th century, protection of Florida torreya against over-harvesting by humans was the only conservation action regularly suggested. By the time the die-off began, a state park already existed in a core part of the species range.

Torreya State Park was established in the 1930s and was the locus for regional employment of the Civilian Conservation Corps during the Great Depression. While named for its famous endemic tree, the site was selected to be a park primarily for historic preservation. Six Confederate gun pits were on a high bluff along the east shore of the Apalachicola River. An antebellum cotton warehouse was near a docking point. Employment swelled in 1935 when a plantation manor that had fallen into disrepair (Jason Gregory House) was dismantled and moved from its location on the west side of the river to its current site, as a centerpiece of the park, on the east.

From 1982 through 1984, The Nature Conservancy acquired more than 6,000 acres for conserving and restoring the steephead ravines and uplands to the south of Torreya State Park. The parcel is named Apalachicola Bluffs and Ravines Preserve.

Both Torreya State Park and the conservancy preserve suffered severe habitat damage in October 2018, when Hurricane Michael struck with category 5 winds.

=== List the species as endangered ===
Categories on the IUCN Redlist

Globally, Torreya taxifolia has been listed as a "critically endangered" species on the IUCN Red List of Threatened Species since 1998. Determinations made by the International Union for the Conservation of Nature primarily affect international trade prohibitions. Within-habitat restrictions and commercial trade are promulgated and administered in the United States by the federal government and relevant states.

In 1984, the U.S. Fish and Wildlife Service listed Torreya taxifolia as endangered, in accordance with the Endangered Species Act of 1973, as amended prior to that time. This action was preceded by several federally sponsored overviews of plants for early consideration, and finally by a proposal to list the species, published in the Federal Register in 1983. The federal proposal included information on existing state regulations in Florida and in Georgia that offered protection for the species, and the additional protection that federal listing would provide:

"Torreya taxifolia is offered protection under Florida Law, Chapter 65—426, Section 865.06 which includes prohibitions concerning taking, transport, and the selling of plants listed under that law. Torreya taxifolia is also included under Georgia's Wild Flower Preservation Act of 1973 which prohibits taking from public lands and intrastate transport and sale of certain rare plant species. The Endangered Species Act would offer additional protection for the species through the recovery process and interstate/international trade prohibitions."

While listing offers legal protection, preventing extinction and working toward full recovery require plans and actions. Two years after declaring the species as endangered, in 1986 the U.S. Fish and Wildlife Service published a recovery plan. The chief tactic was to produce a genetically diverse collection of trees for reproduction and reintroduction into the wild. Other priorities were to protect the habitat of remaining populations, and to study the disease and methods of propagation.

Only two updates of the federal recovery plan have been published since the 1986 original recovery plan. There was an update in 2010 and another in 2020. Because the federal publications are mandated to contain complete, factual, and up-to-date information on endangered species, the 2020 update will be the primary reference for sections on this page dealing with conservation actions. Policy was also expressed in a legal document in 2021, in the agency's 2021 "Finding on a Petition to Downlist the Florida Torreya." This document is primarily relevant in the "Conservation controversies" section of this page.

=== In situ habitat improvement ===
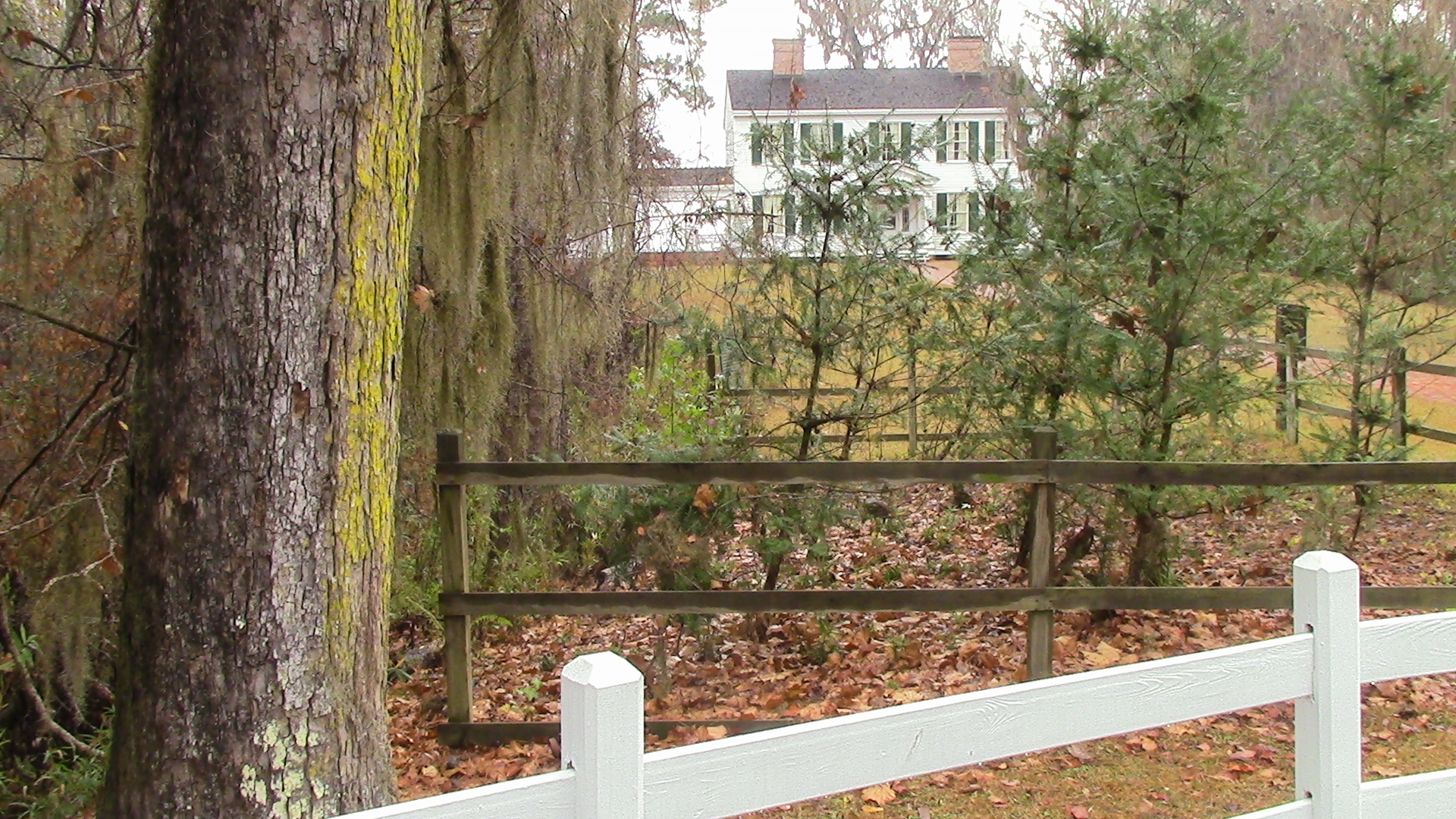
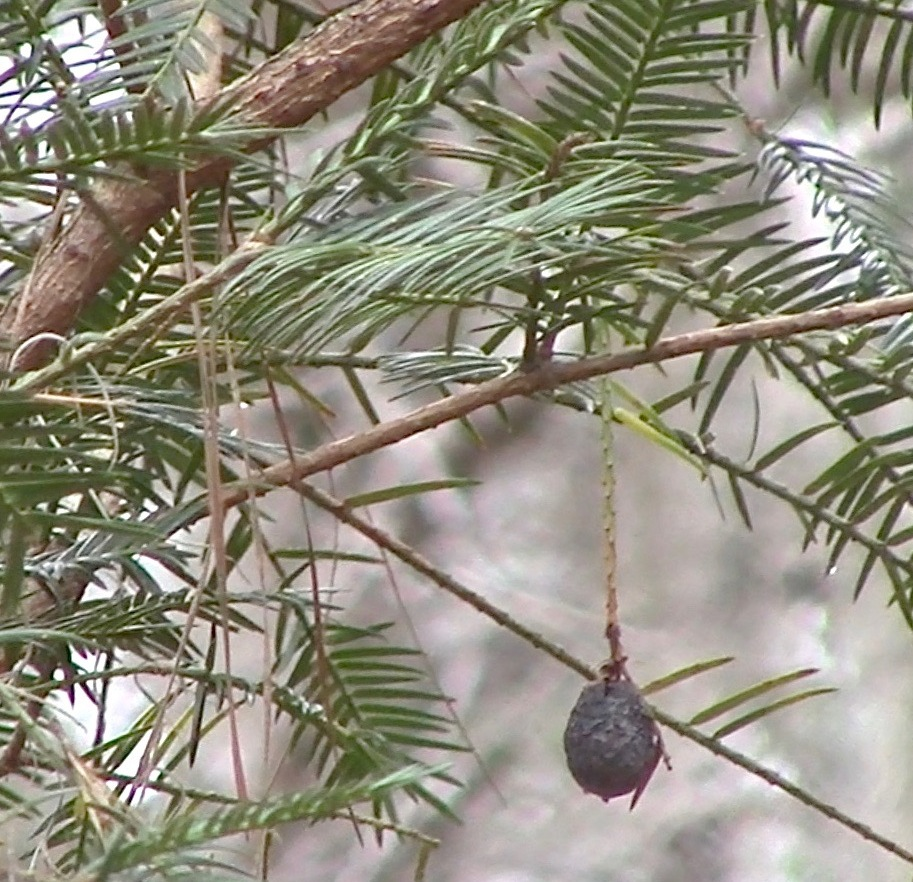
Experimental plantings of Torreya seedlings in front of Gregory House at Torreya State Park, December 2014. Three ripe seeds (dark purple) were still hanging on the sole mature female.
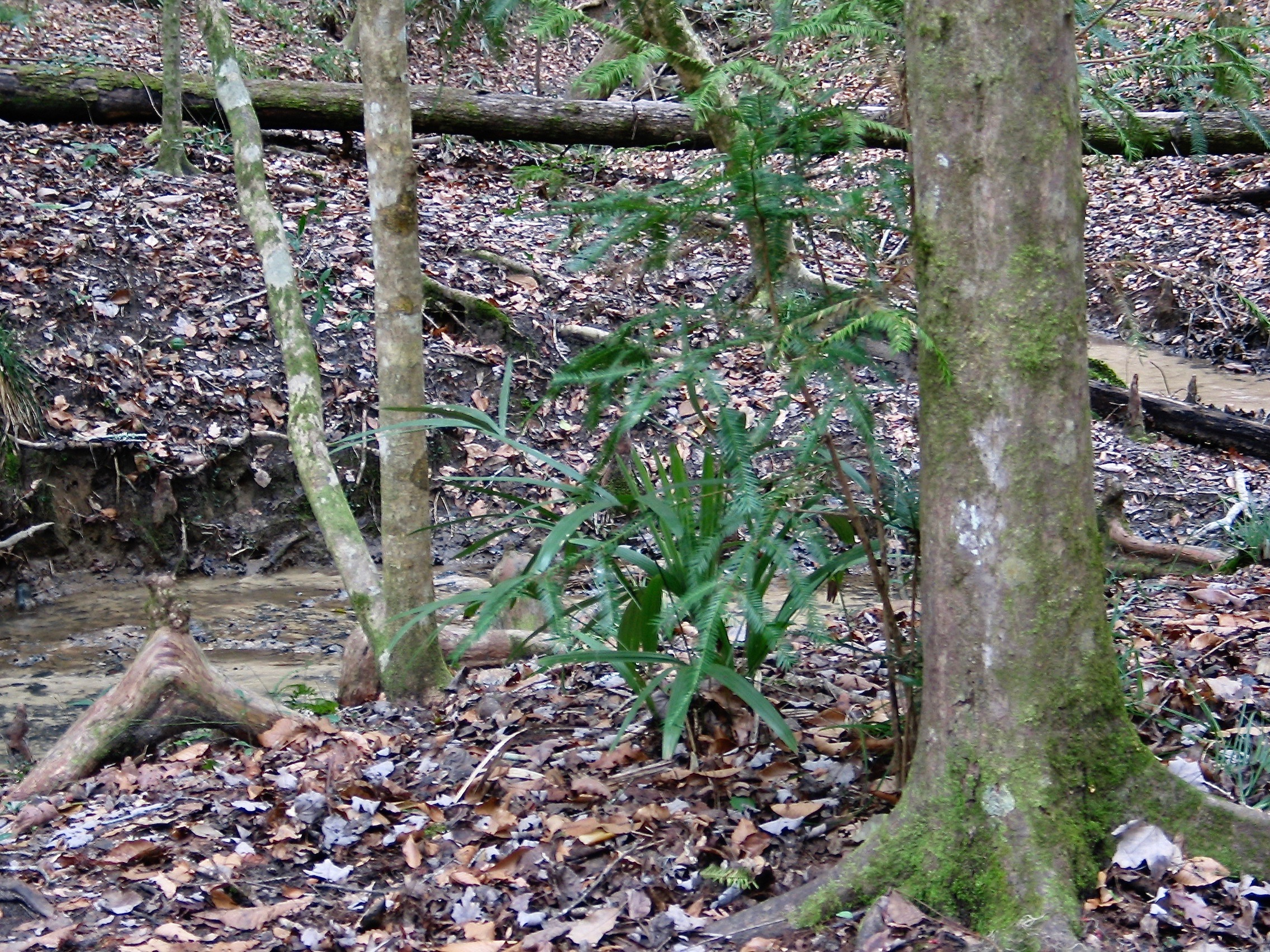
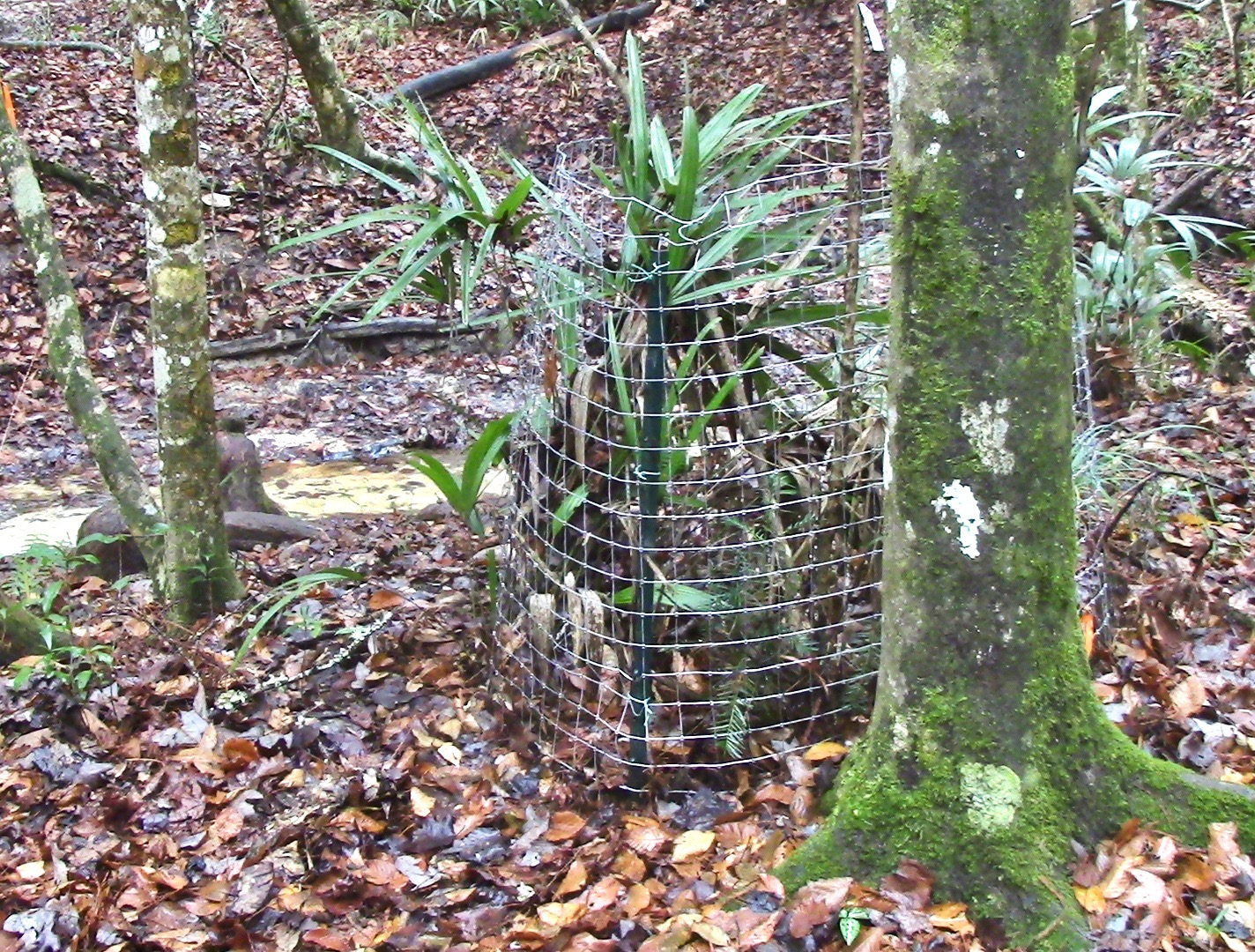
Even after caging, resprouting wild torreyas decline. The same individual in February 2004 (left) and then December 2014 (right). The torreya is still alive, but its tall, leaning stem died and the native needle palm has grown.

One of the "recovery actions" listed in the federal recovery plan for Torreya taxifolia is "Recovery Action 7: Reestablish Torreya in its native habitat." Because the remaining wild plants are all young stems that continue to die back and then resprout from the same rootstock, conservation actions aimed at reestablishing the species in its native range are grounded in first discovering how best to improve the habitat such that new plantings might thrive.

In 2002, potted seedlings descended from the original cuttings taken a dozen years earlier were used experimentally to discover what, if any practices, could improve the prospects for success in the native habitat. None of the tested treatments (fungicide, fertilizer, lime, and combinations of such) worked; two-thirds of the sixty seedlings planted into the forest died in their first year.

The 2020 recovery plan update also reported that in 2011 a new experiment was initiated in forest habitat in the native range. This time, the wild resprouted stems were all caged to prevent herbivory and damage by antler rubbing, and then treated in different ways: (1) control; (2) application of mulch; (3) application of lime; (4) experimental opening of the canopy to increase morning sunlight; and (5) a combination of all treatments. An additional 100 wild torreyas were located and caged during 2012. No documentation of results had been provided to the federal agency.

Category 5 Hurricane Michael opened up a lot of canopy October 2018. Monitoring was initiated right after rescue operations removed woody debris crushing some of the existing stems. Post-hurricane disaster funds were also provided to a new, locally based citizen group called TorreyaKeepers, who organized as a segment of the Florida Native Plants Society. A major accomplishment was the ability of this citizen group to obtain permission from private landowners in Torreya's native range and thereby document more wild specimens — and collect cuttings that Atlanta Botanical Garden then rooted and added to their living collections for safeguarding even more genetic diversity than they already had acquired.

Despite the ongoing actions to improve (or at least restore, post-hurricane) the native range habitat, the chances of restoring this species to viability in its native range have long been regarded as poor.

"Beginning in the late 1950s a sharp decline in the health and reproductive capacity of the native stands was noticed. Since then, all full-sized mature individuals have perished and seed production is extremely rare in the wild (E.O. Wilson, pers. comm.). Where trees of 60 feet were found, few individuals over 10 feet are now known. Research into the cause of the decline is ongoing, but in situ preservation appears problematic and management efforts now include the propagation of rooted cuttings from documented wild stands to be grown in ex situ populations. Because set seed is so rare in the wild, vegetative propagation is the only means left to secure documented wild germplasm for study, possible distribution, and possible reintroduction."

Ex situ genetic safeguarding was thus a widely understood necessity.

=== Ex situ genetic safeguarding ===
An article titled "The Ex Situ Conservation of Stinking Cedar" was published in the July 1998 issue of Public Garden. Among its four coauthors, Rob Nicholson led the original field expeditions for collected branchlets from wild specimens in the native range. Ron Determann was in charge of rooting the share of those branchlets received by Atlanta Botanical Garden. The publication includes information on the whereabouts and status of known horticultural plantings that preceded the 1984 listing of Torreya taxifolia as endangered. They wrote:

"The cultivation of Torreya taxifolia began not long after its discovery in 1835 by Hardy Bryant Croom. By 1859, A.J. Downing reported on the success of the plant growing in cultivation: 'Our best specimen is about eight feet high, very dense, showing nothing but foliage, like a thrifty arbor vitae, and remarkable, particularly in winter, for the star-like appearance of the extreme tips of its young shoots. We have returns of this tree from Elizabethtown, N.J., Dobbs' Ferry, Yorkville, Flushing and Newport, in all of which places it succeeds well, and is considered hardy, except at the last place where it is reported tender.' Sargent in 1905 wrote that Torreya was 'now often planted in the public grounds and gardens of Tallahassee, Florida.' At present, no trees of any size are known in the northeastern United States, and the successful long-term cultivation of Torreya taxifolia north of Virginia remains unknown. The number of mature trees in cultivation outside of Florida may number less than two dozen. In contrast, old and large trees of Torreya nucifera are found in Boston, Massachusetts, and Swarthmore, Pennsylvania."

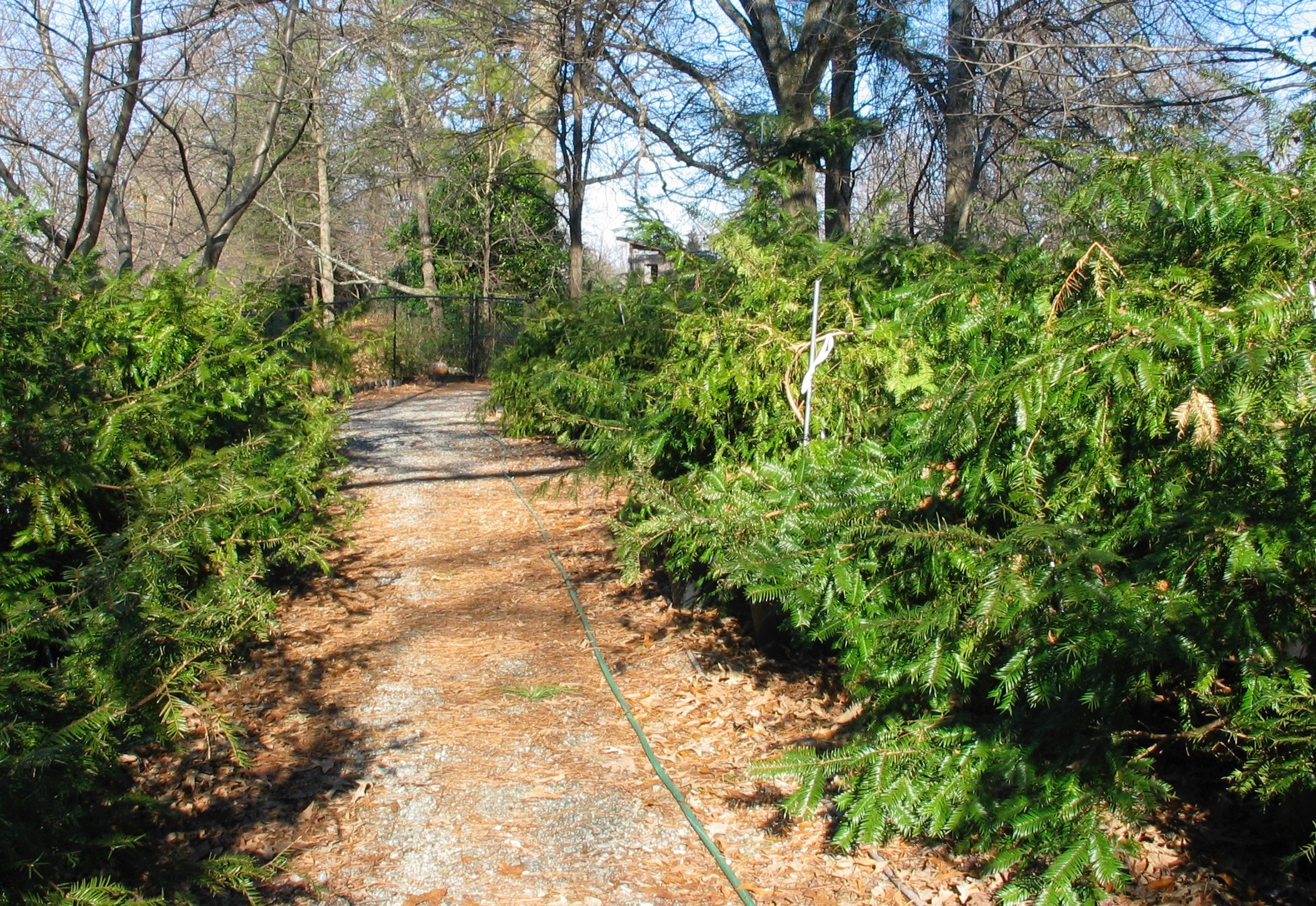
Shrubby growth form of original cuttings in the safeguarding collection at Atlanta Botanical Garden, 2007.

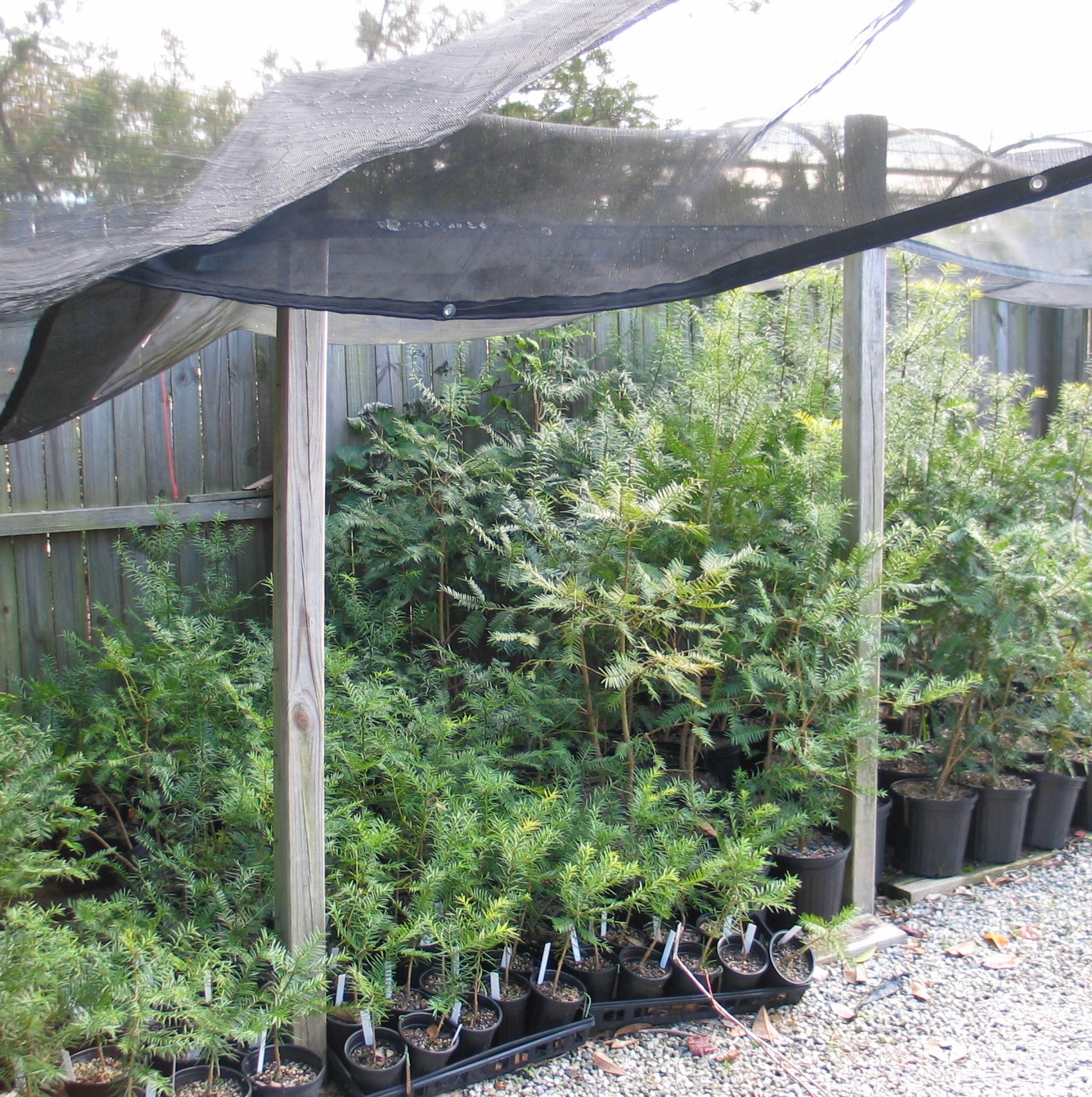
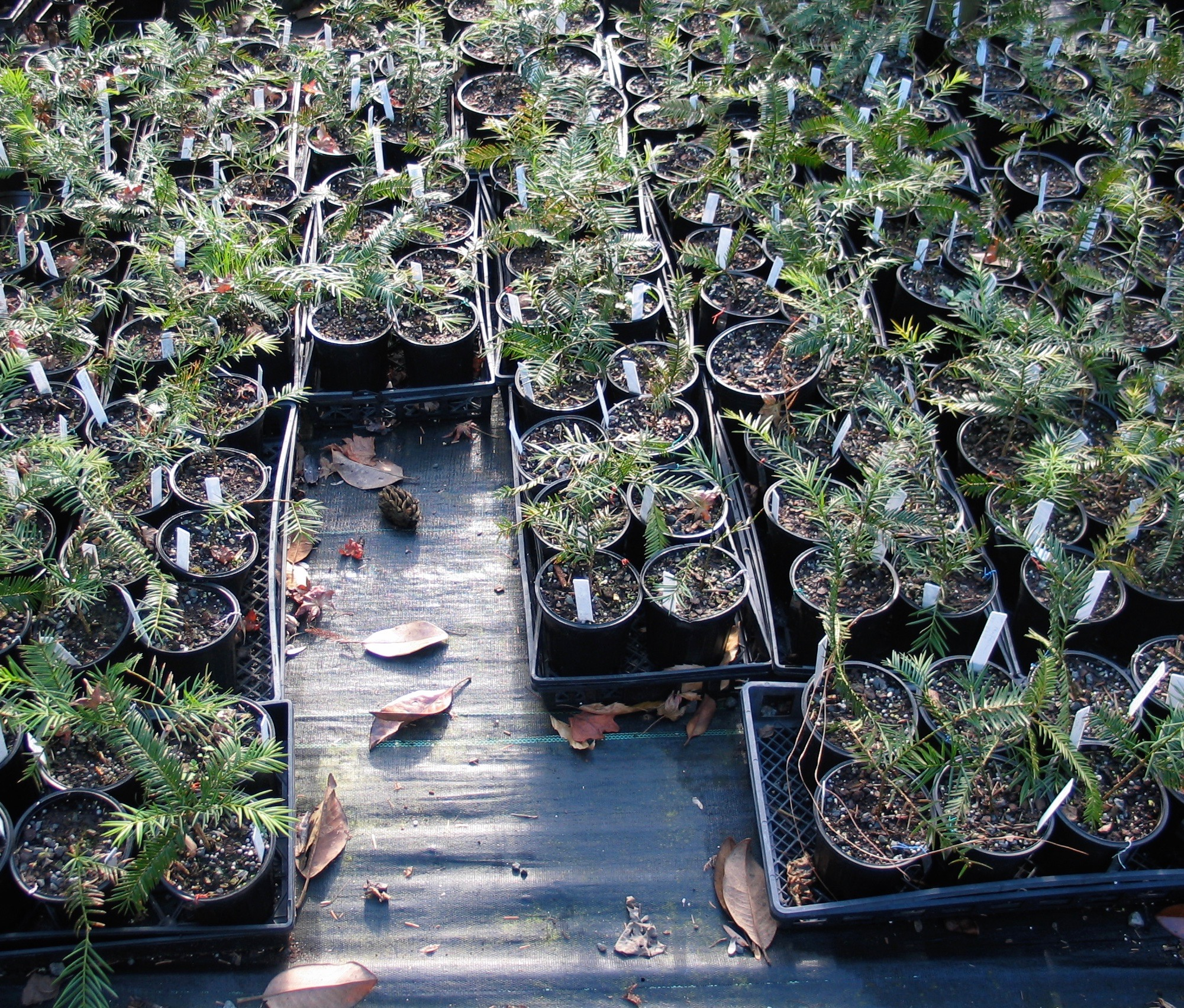
Propagation of Torreya taxifolia at Atlanta Botanical Garden, 2007. A vast amount of multi-year seedlings descend from original rooted cuttings already producing cones at the garden.

Seeds or rooted cuttings of remaining wild specimens are foundational to the creation of potted or planted orchards for preventing outright extinction of a plant species and for maintaining documented genetic diversity of wild, rather than horticultural (or unknown) provenance. For safeguarding Torreya taxifolia in this way, "a large-scale ex situ effort began in 1985, funded by the Center for Plant Conservation and the Arnold Arboretum (Nicholson 1996). Rob Nicholson and Mark Schwartz collected cuttings from 163 wild lineages of T. taxifolia and then distributed resulting plants to 10 institutions in North America and Europe in the early 1990s."

Multiple vegetative cuttings were taken from each of the 163 wild types, aggregating in a total of 2,622 cuttings. Because the original cuttings were mainly collected from lateral branches, shrubby forms (see image at right), rather than standard trees, were the result. For safeguarding purposes, in large pots or outdoor plantings, the shrub form was well equipped to produce male and female cones, often earlier than seed-grown plants would have, and sometimes in abundance.

Only institutions in favorable climatic zones, however, could retain their specimens over the long term. Harvard's Arnold Arboretum, in Massachusetts, is hundreds of miles north of the native range of this plant. So in 1991, 97 rooted branchlets were returned to Florida, for safeguarding at Bok Tower Gardens.

Even more were transferred to the Atlanta Botanical Garden in Georgia, which reported ongoing results in a 2020 publication: "In 1990, Atlanta Botanical Garden received 155 clones of T. taxifolia propagated from the remaining natural population by Arnold Arboretum and the Center for Plant Conservation. This material has been safeguarded at the Atlanta Botanical Garden since that time, and propagation efforts have increased the collection to include almost 1,000 plants, including nearly 500 distinct vegetative clones from the wild."

Both the 2010 and 2020 recovery plan updates contain exactly the same information and language for the Georgia paragraph in the section titled "Recovery Action 5: Establish experimental collections of Torreya outside its native habitat."

"GEORGIA: The Atlanta Botanical Garden (ABG) and the Georgia Department of Natural Resources outplanted 19 individuals of T. taxifolia at the Smithgall Woods in White County in north Georgia. The purpose of the Smithgall Woods collection and two additional offsite plantings (Blairsville, GA and Vogel State Park) were to establish safeguarding populations of Torreya to conserve material that had been propagated at the ABG in backup collections at more than one location (Cruse-Sanders 2010, pers. comm.). The material planted at Smithgall Woods was propagated from all Georgia source population material (Army Corps. Of Engineers, site at Woodruff Dam, Lake Seminole, in Georgia). The trees have grown quite large and are now reproductively mature, producing male and female cones annually. Most of the plants were placed in full sun and they are quite healthy. Major threats to the trees at this location are lawn management (weed wackers) and fire ants. The trees at Vogel State park are smaller than those at Smithgall Woods and have not yet reached reproductive maturity. Trees that are planted outside of the range of T. taxifolia need documentation of lineage."

Because the Smithgall Woods, Vogel State Park, and Blairsville ex situ plantings are each within 30 miles of Georgia's border with North Carolina, they all offer the species not only a cooler climate than the historically native range but also terrain higher in altitude and gently mountainous. A 2020 report by the Atlanta Botanical Garden describes the Smithgall Woods ex situ collection as a collaborative project between Atlanta Botanical Garden and the State Botanical Garden of Georgia, which is within the University of Georgia system. A total of 21 genetically distinct specimens are at this site, and "nearly 5,000 fruit were harvested in 2016."

Both the 2010 and 2020 recovery plan updates include in "Recovery Action 5" a short paragraph on ex situ plantings in North Carolina, though they differ somewhat in text language. The 2020 update states:

"NORTH CAROLINA: In 1939 nearly a dozen specimens of T. taxifolia were planted at the Biltmore Gardens; 31 seedlings were planted in 2008 at two locations near Waynesville; this site summarizes the outplantings conducted in NC (http://www.torreyaguardians.org/north-carolina.html)."

=== Document early horticultural plantings ===
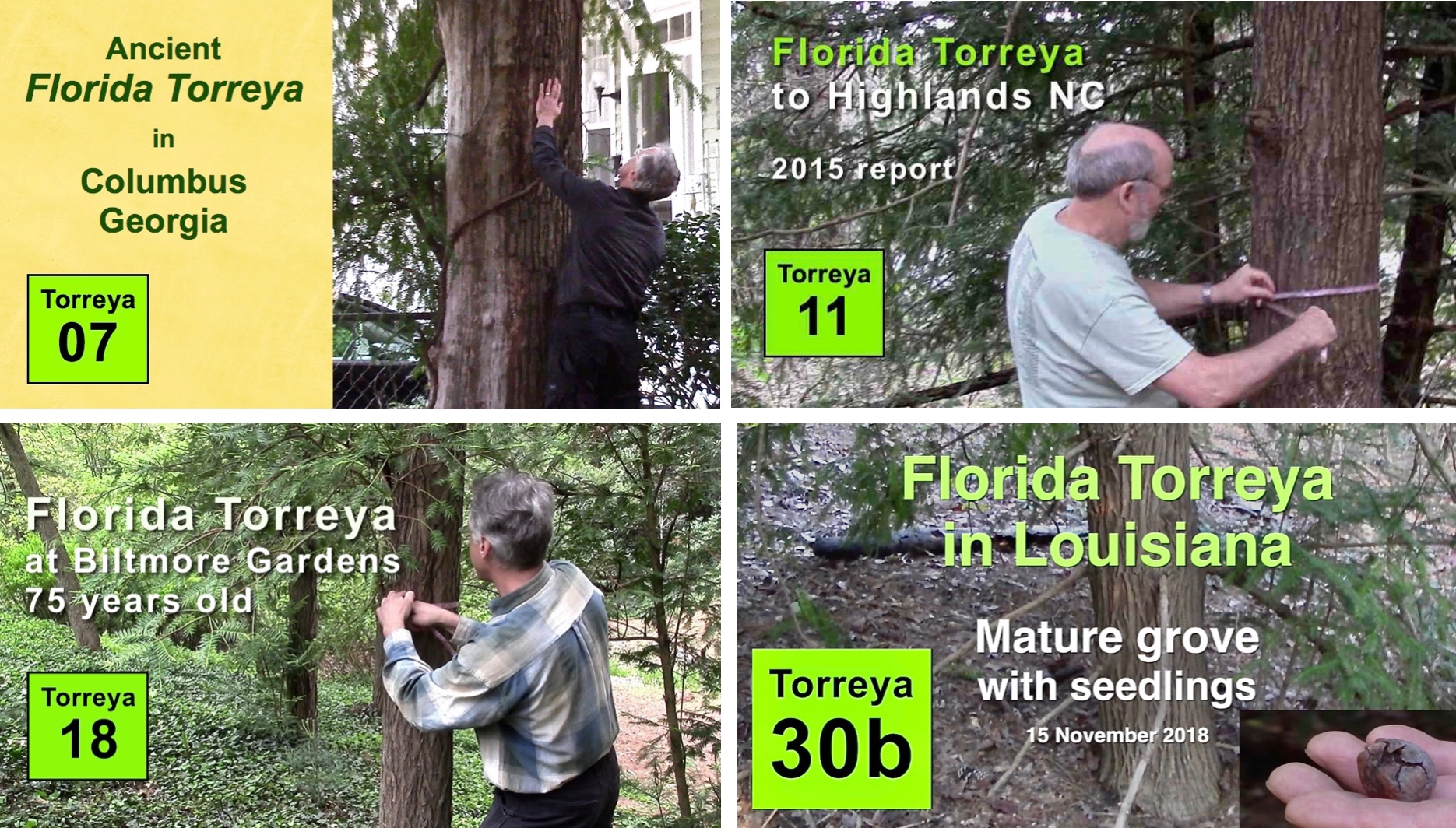
Historic groves of Torreya taxifolia planted outside of native range have been documented by Torreya Guardians and posted as photo-essays on the group's website and also as videos.

When the original recovery plan for Torreya taxifolia was produced in 1986, it was known that this species had attracted horticultural plantings over many decades — not only in Florida, but also in states outside of the historically native range. A number of such sites are listed on page 7 of the plan. Maclay State Gardens in Tallahassee, Florida, was listed as being "severely affected" by pathogens. But two horticultural sites in Georgia (Columbus and Fort Gaines) and three sites in North Carolina (Highlands, Asheville, and Norlina) "appear to be in good health."

"Inventory plantings at botanical gardens and arboreta" was one of the recovery actions specified in 1986 because "Information on where the plants are, and how they are thriving, could be valuable in planning future plantings." A related action, "Supplement existing plantings" was proposed because it "could eventually lead to greater genetic diversity in the seeds produced at these sites."

A tabular form of "Record of Actions" maintained by the federal agency is available online. (It can be accessed via the main listing page of Torreya taxifolia as the link titled "View implementation progress.") As of June 2024, both of the above actions are listed. Action 51 "Inventory plantings at botanical gardens" is listed as "not started." Action 52 "Supplement existing plantings" and Action 53 "Establish new plantings" are both listed as "unknown."

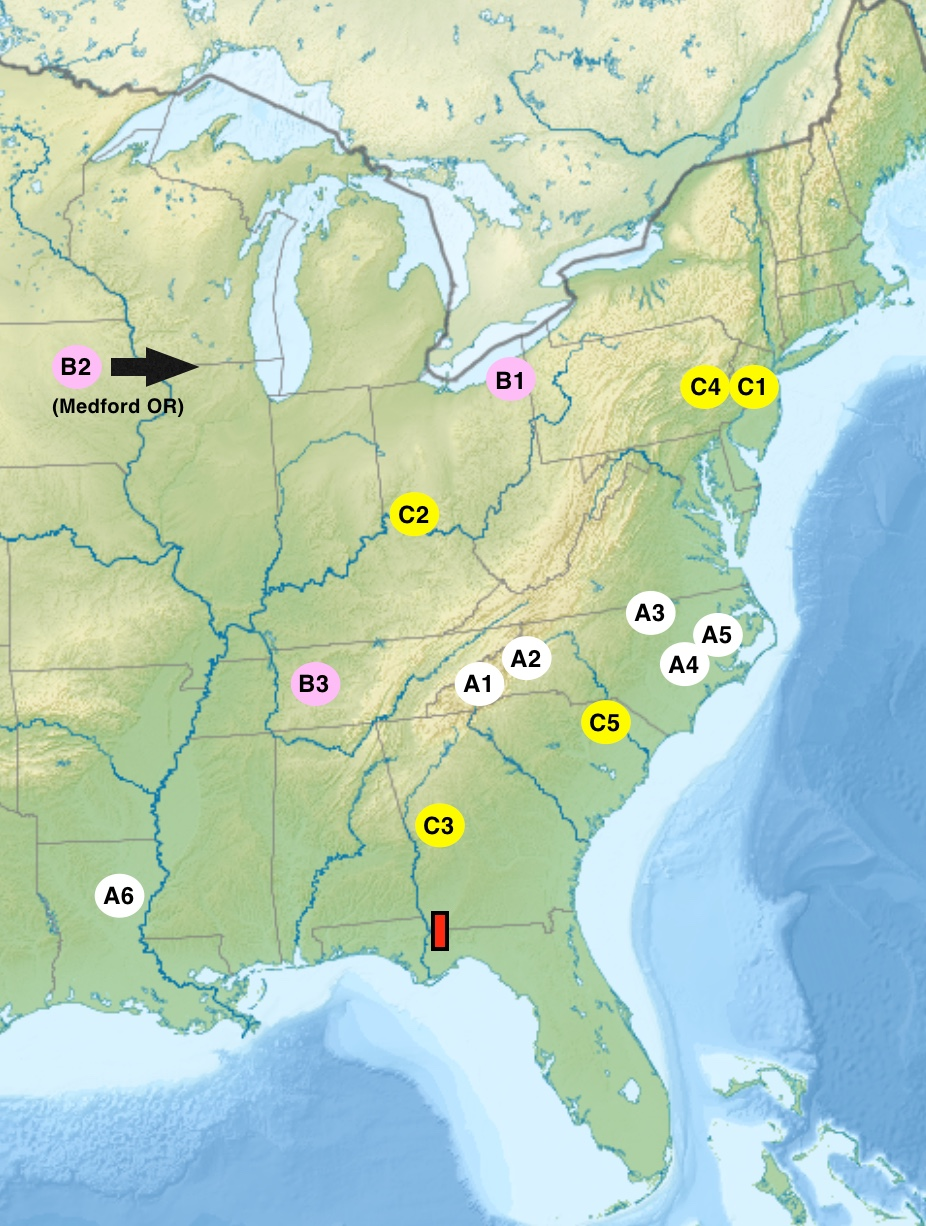
Map created by Torreya Guardians of "historic groves" of mature horticultural specimens of Florida torreya.

Torreya Guardians began photo-documenting (and later, video-documenting) mature horticultural plantings outside of Florida soon after their beginnings in 2005. August 2018, the main images and results were aggregated into a new webpage on their site, "Historic Groves of Torreya Trees: Long-term Experiments in Assisted Migration."

A map (image at right) appears on that page. Locations marked in white circles are fully naturalized and thus produce not only seeds but also demonstrate a habitat and climate suitable for wild-dispersed seedlings to have established nearby. The pink circles show sites of seed-producing trees, but no evidence yet of established seedlings. Yellow circles mark mature trees that lack documentation of seed production.

The page begins with a summary statement: "Based on observations and documentation by Torreya Guardians of 'historic groves' (where one or more trees were planted north of Florida before the 1984 designation of Florida Torreya as an endangered species), it is reasonable to conclude that Torreya taxifolia is non-invasive and can thrive in locations substantially north of its peak glacial refuge."

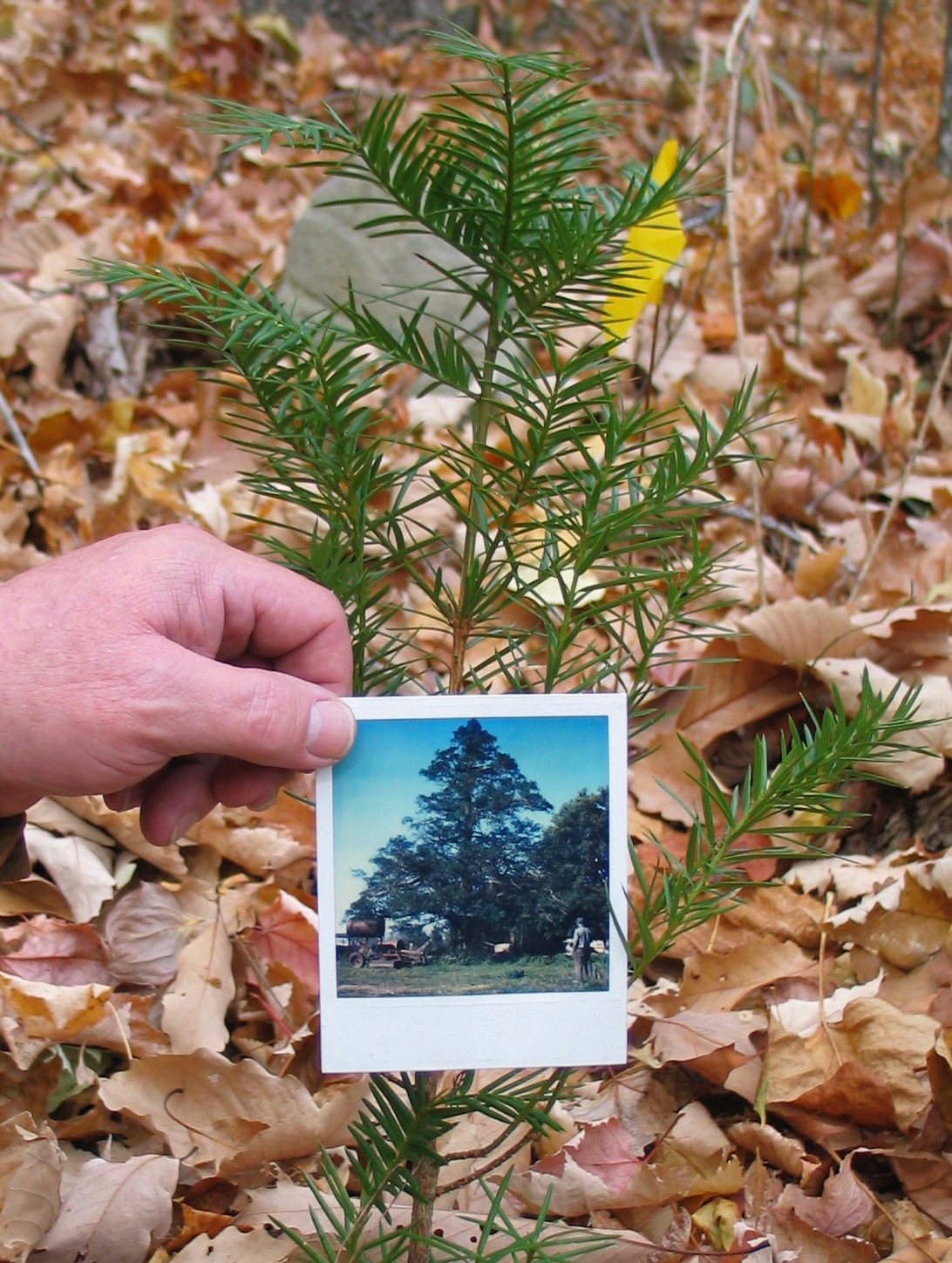
Lee Barnes holds a 1984 photo he took of the Florida torreya in Norlina, NC. The seedling behind was planted in Waynesville, NC in 2008 by Lee and other Torreya Guardians.

A total of 14 horticultural plantings in the United States are grouped into three categories: Naturalized groves (offspring onsite), Mature trees producing seeds, and Mature trees not producing seeds. The group has documented through photo-essays and videos a total of 5 groves in North Carolina, 2 groves apiece in Pennsylvania and Ohio and just a single grove (or tree) in Georgia, South Carolina, Tennessee, Louisiana, and Oregon.

Possibly the oldest living Florida torreya is a single tree growing at a private home in Norlina, North Carolina. Archival documentation of the Norlina tree establishes that around 1860, U.S. President Buchanan overnighted there while traveling to Washington D.C. from Florida. He gave the then-seedling as a hospitality gift. Somewhat different documentation appears in the 1986 federal recovery plan. Burl Turnage is credited with reporting that the Norlina tree was, at that time, 45 feet tall with a 34-inch basal diameter and that it was "moved to North Carolina in 1840."

The image at right shows a photo of the Norlina tree, taken by Lee Barnes in 1984. He is holding the small photo in front of a seedling he planted July 2008, near his home in Waynesville, North Carolina. That seedling is documented as having the Norlina tree as female parent and the male from Gladwyne, Pennsylvania — via rooted branchlets planted next to one another in South Carolina.

More archival documentation of horticultural plantings is ongoingly compiled by Torreya Guardian Paul Camire into an online document. As of 2024, the document is 27 pages. It includes many more sites than shown on the map because entries also entail international sites, commercial nurseries that have sold this species (as early as the 1800s), and sites in which torreya plantings have either died or been removed for other purposes.

Documentation of "historic groves in northward states" was presented as "Accomplishment 1" by the group Torreya Guardians in a "Petition to Downlist from endangered to threatened Torreya taxifolia" that Connie Barlow filed as an individual September 2019. Two years later, a decision was issued and published, with no change in species status of imperilment. But Factor E of the decision, "Documentation of Historical Groves," did acknowledge the citizen accomplishments in this regard:

"The petition provides and cites credible information to corroborate the claim that recent and historical outplantings of Florida torreya have been documented at localities outside of the native range of the species. The petition claims that the documentation of the species' ability to survive and reproduce in the Southern Appalachians could be considered the completion of Action Item 5 of the species 1986 Recovery Plan, which states the need to 'establish experimental collections of torreya outside of its native habitat.' However, the petition further explains that the majority of the documented outplantings are not in locations that would 'give rise to new and expanding populations'. Ultimately, the relative reproductive success of the outplanted groves do not ameliorate the threats currently affecting the species in its native range (i.e. low population number, rarity of habitat, and disease, USFWS 2010)."

== Conservation controversies ==
Management of Torreya taxifolia as an endangered species has engendered controversy because a group of citizens, calling themselves Torreya Guardians, launched their own recovery program in 2005 by exploiting a legal exception for plants in the US Endangered Species Act. They began experimental plantings in the Appalachian Mountains and northward by obtaining donations of seeds from the owners of horticultural plantings in North Carolina. Media and academic publications have both reported on the unusual character and progress of this citizen form of species recovery.

=== Assisted migration (the policy debate) ===
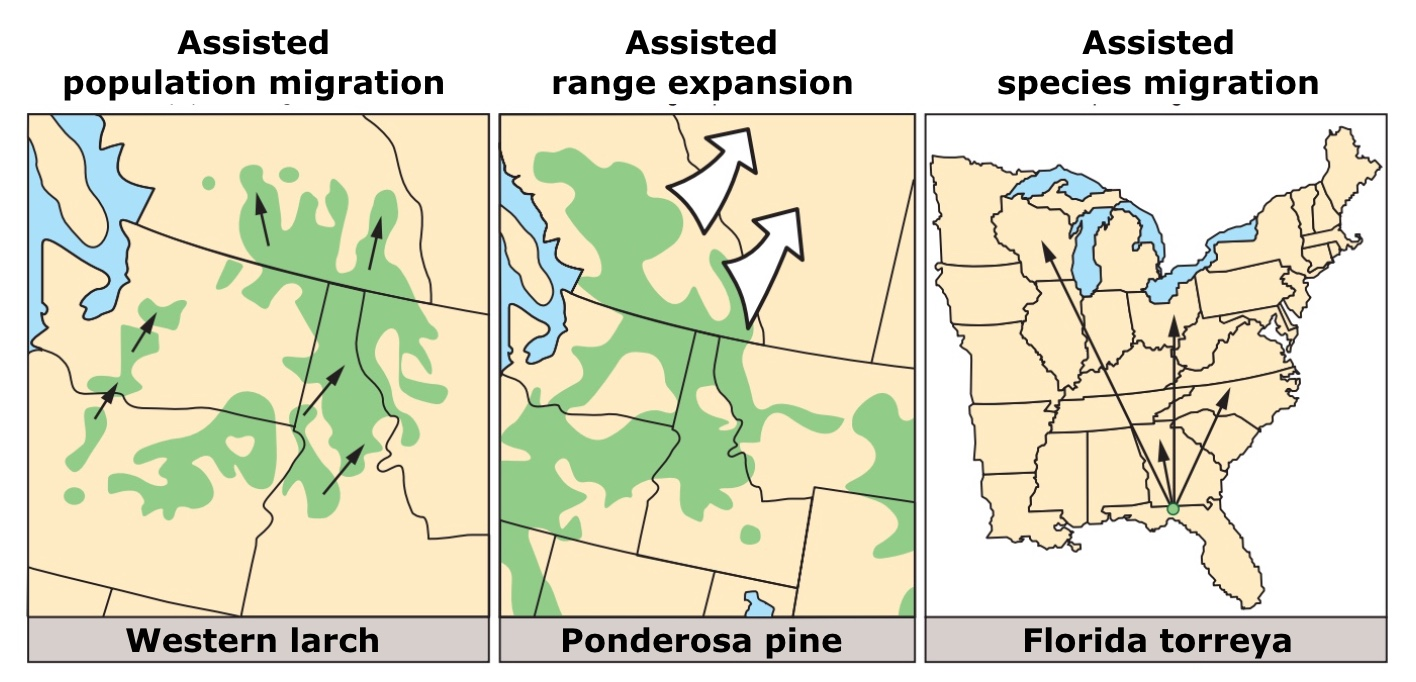
In 2014 researchers in the U.S. Forest Service suggested three types of assisted migration. Florida torreya was the tree listed for the type called "assisted species migration."

Assisted migration, also known as assisted colonization or managed relocation, became a controversial topic in both conservation biology and forestry soon after the name was coined, albeit informally, by Brian Keel in 2002 and 2004. In his graduate work, Keel proposed that an orchid endemic to coastal South Carolina be translocated poleward as a response to climate change.

In 2004, this new possible tool for climate change adaptation became central in a species-specific debate published in Wild Earth. The forum topic was titled "Assisted Migration of an Endangered Tree." That tree was Torreya taxifolia. Connie Barlow and Paul S. Martin coauthored the pro argument: "Bring Torreya taxifolia North — Now." Mark W. Schwartz wrote the con argument: "Conservationists Should Not Move Torreya taxifolia."

Barlow and Martin grounded their advocacy in a deep time worldview, as Martin was a well-known Pleistocene ecologist at the University of Arizona. Barlow, a science writer, had written four popular science books on the topics of evolutionary biology and evolutionary ecology as well as several academic papers in those fields. Schwartz was a plant ecologist and (now emeritus) professor in the Department of Environmental Science and Policy at the University of California, Davis. In 2018 he was named a fellow of the Ecological Society of America.

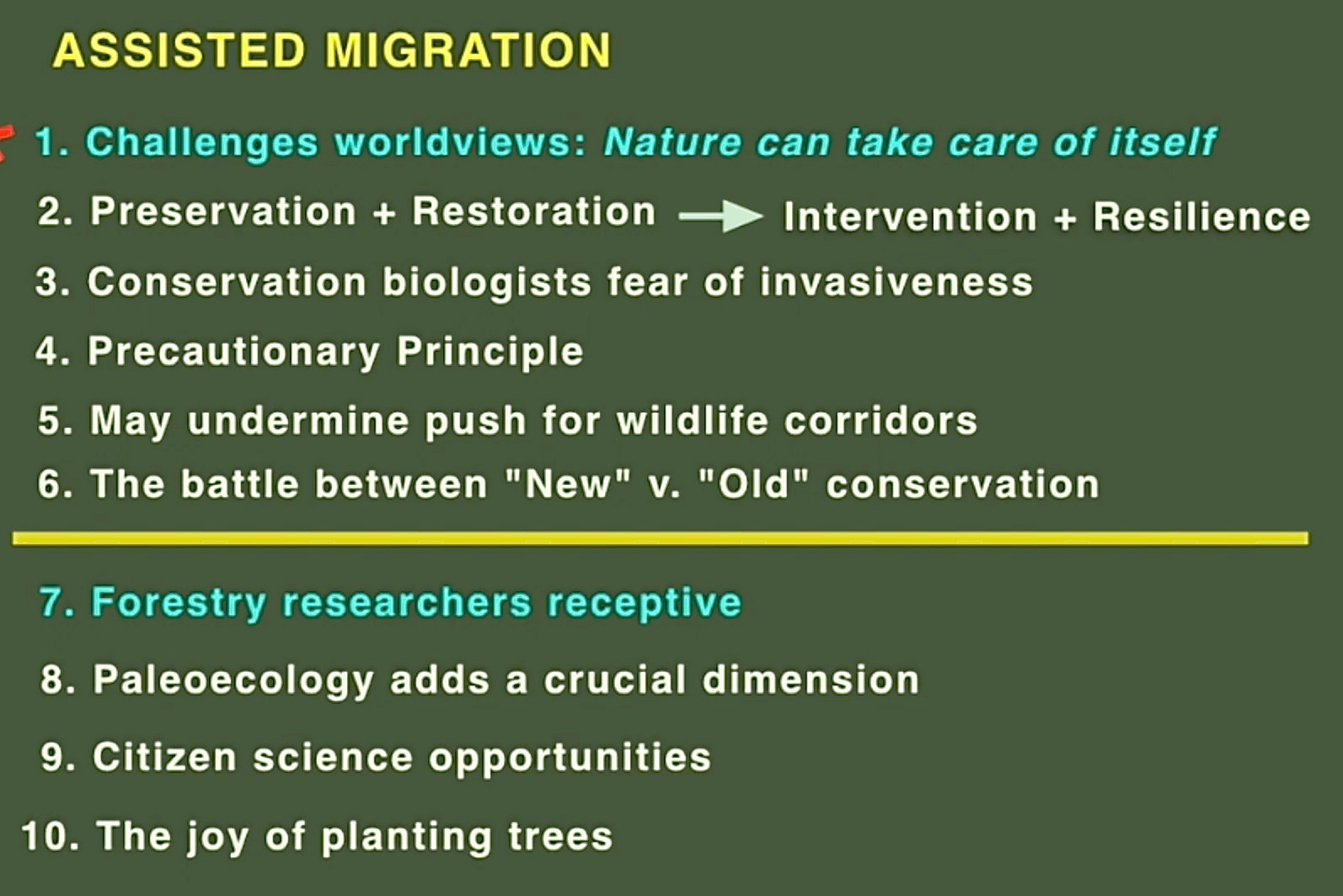
Slide from the September 2015 talk by Connie Barlow on assisted migration at Michigan Technological University, September 2015.

Barlow and Martin framed their deep-time argument in this way:

"Might it be possible for T. tax to take its place once again as a thriving member of some subset of Appalachian forest communities? We say again because we believe that northern Florida is more properly viewed not as native range for T. tax but as peak-glacial range. Helping T. tax establish in the southern Appalachians is thus not so much relocation for a plant struggling with global warming as repatriation of a once-native. It is a form of rewilding that uses a deep-time baseline for determining appropriate range."

Schwartz agreed that Torreya taxifolia was "a glacial relict, quite likely on the edge of its climatic tolerance, and might do well in a cooler climate." Also, "global warming can put species in jeopardy." But his main point about assisted migration for this particular endangered species was that "assisted migration sets a risky precedent." Thus,

"I believe that conservationists should be very reticent about introducing species to novel environments as a conservation measure. Societal recognition of an appropriate reticence toward species introductions has been slow, but is emerging (Mack 2000). If we are to now advocate species introductions on behalf of conservation, conservationists must have clear guidance as to when this action is warranted and when it is not. It is not an action to be taken lightly."

Other differences in worldview and priorities were also evident in the pro and con statements. Barlow and Martin wrote of the importance of rewilding and thus judged that "a network of 'potted orchards' of T. tax tended in northern botanical gardens, though a good hedge against outright extinction, falls far short of the mark — potted is the botanical equivalent of caged." Schwartz contended, "Certainly, we do not want to return to a static view of forests and manage our natural lands as museum pieces, but then again we would like to retain an historical basis for the range of variability in composition of plant communities that are representative of the habitats we are trying to conserve (Landres 1999)." He continued,

"Without a baseline we have no target. Without a target, every kind of management, including those that result in lost native species, is arguably a success. I fear such success. Intentional introduction of species outside their current distributions in an effort to conserve them detracts from and trivializes this baseline and threatens to discount standards for conservation."

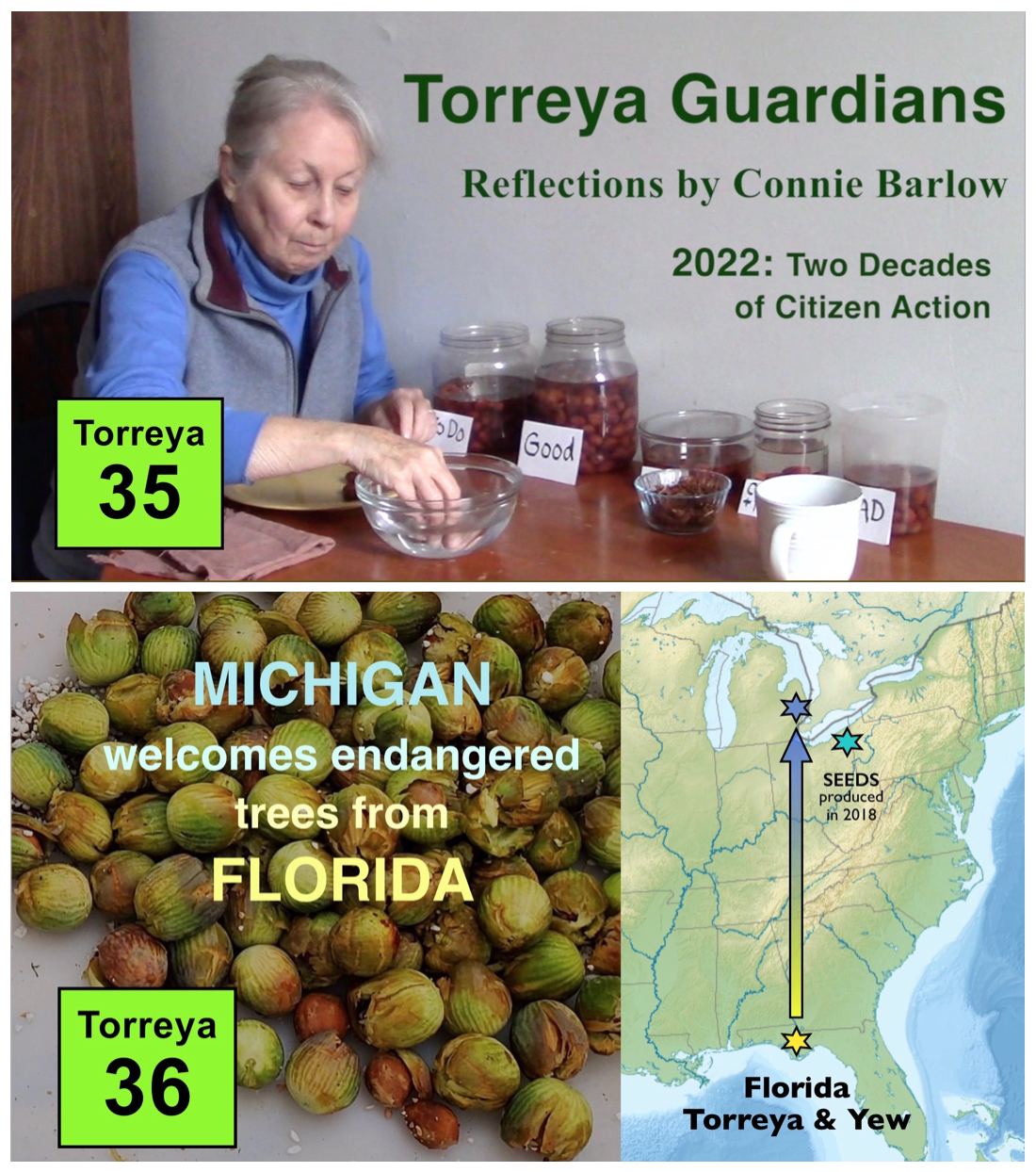
Video episodes 35 and 36 by Torreya Guardians

The authors on both sides of the debate continued their advocacy. Barlow founded the citizen group Torreya Guardians in 2005, with Paul Martin's encouragement until his death in 2010. Media attention of the group (and of the assisted migration controversy) ramped up when their first northward plantings began in July 2008. As of 2024, Barlow was still the webmaster of the group's domain and, in her retirement, had more time to document achievements and network for the group. As well, in 2022 she wrote of her experience with Torreya Guardians in her supportive comment filed in response to the proposed federal regulation that would eliminate "historical range" as the sole locus for endangered species recovery. (The regulation took effect in 2023.)

Schwartz is now emeritus professor, and his homepage lists as one of his foci of continuing research: "Establishing policy for emerging conservation strategies such as assisted migration (mostly in the form of constraining unsanctioned private action)." During the preceding two decades, he had become one of the most prolific authors of academic papers and advice to natural area managers pertaining to both "establishing policy" and "constraining unsanctioned private action." Publications in which he was lead or coauthor include "A Framework for Debate of Assisted Migration in an Era of Climate Change" (2007), "The Precautionary Principle in Managed Relocation Is Misguided Advice" (2009), and "Multidimensional Evaluation of Managed Relocation" (2009). His early leadership in conservation biology policy development culminated in 2012, when he served as first author, with 31 coauthors, of a paper in process since the 2008 meeting of the Ecological Society of America: "Managed Relocation: Integrating the Scientific, Regulatory, and Ethical Challenges." Schwartz and his academic colleagues also began to advise and coauthor papers with management staff of U.S. national parks and wildlife refuges, culminating in a 2021 paper by a dozen coauthors titled, "Co-development of a Risk Assessment Strategy for Managed Relocation."

Strong disapproval of citizens taking action on their own was expressed by Schwartz (and his 31 coauthors) in the 2012 paper referenced above. Action already undertaken by Torreya Guardians was the focus of criticism: "It may be as important to discourage ad hoc managed relocation by enthusiastic individuals or groups as it is to provide guidelines for well-planned actions." As well, "Individuals and groups like the Torreya Guardians, who are motivated by conservation goals, may be dissuadable by education." This aspect of the controversy is summarized in a case study on assisted migration that was published by the Online Ethics Center for Engineering and Science, as the study author chose Torreya taxifolia as the focal species and emphasized the actions and perspectives of Torreya Guardians:

"According to group leader and founder, Barlow, she felt the assisted migration method was (and is) an 'easy, legal, and cheap' way to protect the endangered tree species from extinction. First, anyone with access to the web (and some private land) can apply to take part in a test planting via the group's website (Torreya Guardians 2016d). And although they've been called 'ecological vigilantes' (The Economist 2015), it's also legal. Distribution of endangered plants and seeds is lax, particularly within states, and then once privately owned, individuals can go across state lines with their plant property as they please (Shirey and Lamberti 2011). Finally, this scheme is cheap, requiring only small out-of-pocket expenses from volunteers to initiate and maintain plantings."

A 2022 article in an annual journal produced by the Atlanta Botanical Garden characterized the prospect of applying assisted migration to Florida torreya in this way:

While it is tempting to consider moving T. taxifolia to more northern latitudes, where cooler temperatures might make the trees more resilient to fungal diseases, the global and ongoing threat of global warming means that such solutions are only temporary unless climate change is effectively mitigated. Moving such a highly susceptible fungal host to a novel ecosystem is also risky, as even if the transplants are initially free of fungal pathogens, doing so creates opportunity for novel fungal diseases to eventually establish in ecosystems and permanently change the local ecology.

A 2023 regulatory change in how the Endangered Species Act of 1973 is administered opens a doorway for recovery plan updates to begin authorizing assisted migration of endangered species. If implemented in behalf of Torreya taxifolia, citizens would no longer be alone in this effort. Section 10j "Experimental populations" was updated by removing the "historical range" constraint on where such experiments could be sited. A government press release explained, "Updating this proven conservation tool will allow the Service to keep pace with corresponding science, which has shown that climate change and invasive species are pushing plants and animals into completely new geographic areas for the habitat needed for their continued survival."

=== Management of seeds produced ex situ ===
Assisted migration of an imperiled plant is possible only if there are mature trees that produce ample numbers of seeds. Equally, assisted migration can only happen if the managers of those sites allow seeds to be distributed for such purpose. The controversy that emerged about management of Torreya taxifolia seeds is of two types:

1. The official ex situ groves in northern Georgia that were safeguarding wild genetics were being managed by two botanical gardens in ways that eventually resulted in large numbers of seeds remaining uncollected.

2. Citizens were using legally accessed seeds for northward plantings outside of any established policy framework and without officially sanctioned oversight.

==== Seeds produced from official plantings ====
Any botanical garden with a greenhouse may be suitable for rooting wild-cut branchlets. Only those in compatible climates, however, can advance into a large-scale genetic safeguarding project when the specimens need to be moved outdoors. Atlanta Botanical Garden was well positioned to maintain outdoors hundreds of potted plants (and a score of outplanted individuals), first in its main campus in Atlanta (200 miles north of the species' native range) and subsequently in an ancillary facility for rare plants 40 miles farther north. The sequence of photos below show their progress in safeguarding Torreya taxifolia 16 years after branchlets were harvested in the wild.

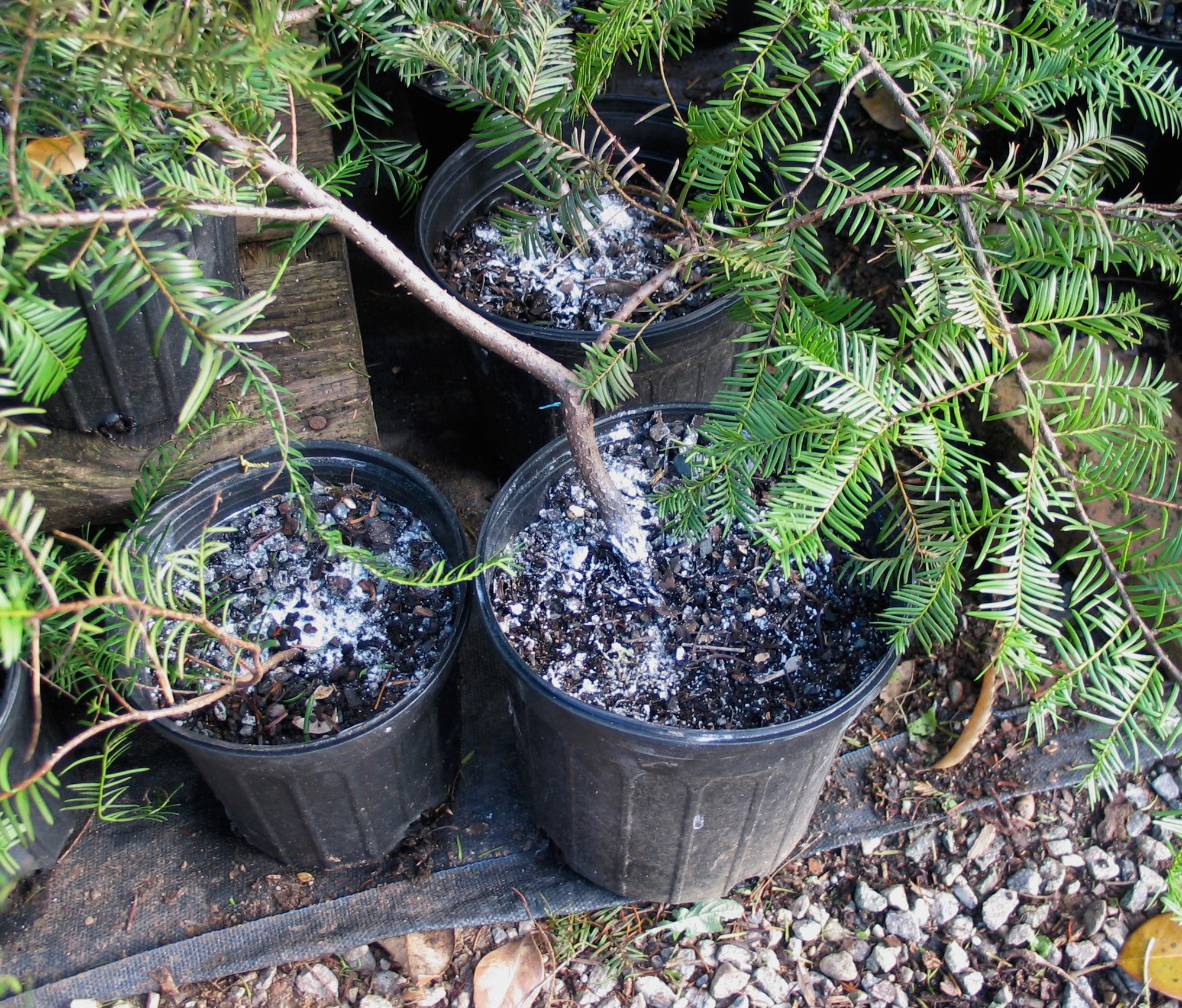
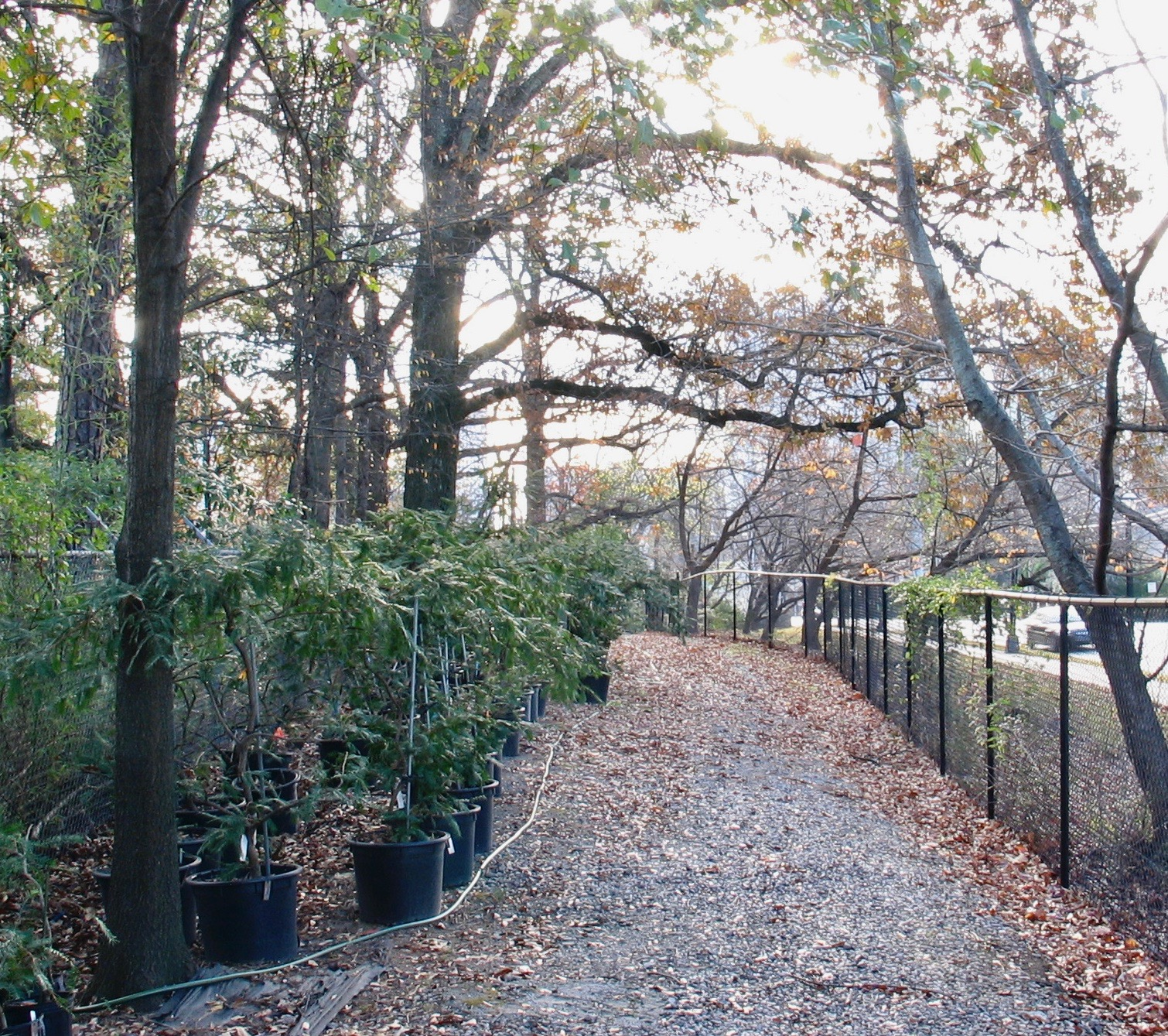
Rooted branchlets (with lime supplement, white) at Atlanta Botanical Garden, under a deciduous canopy (Dec 2007).
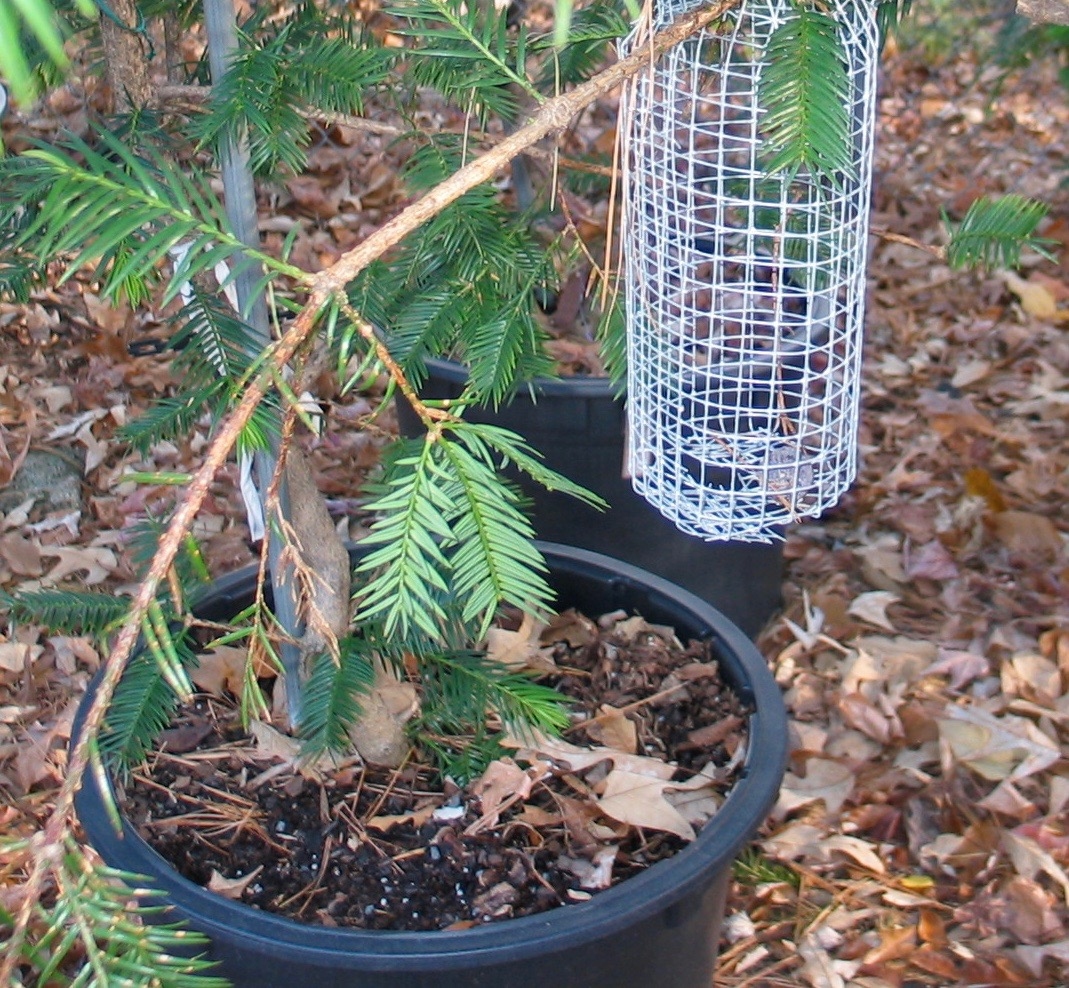
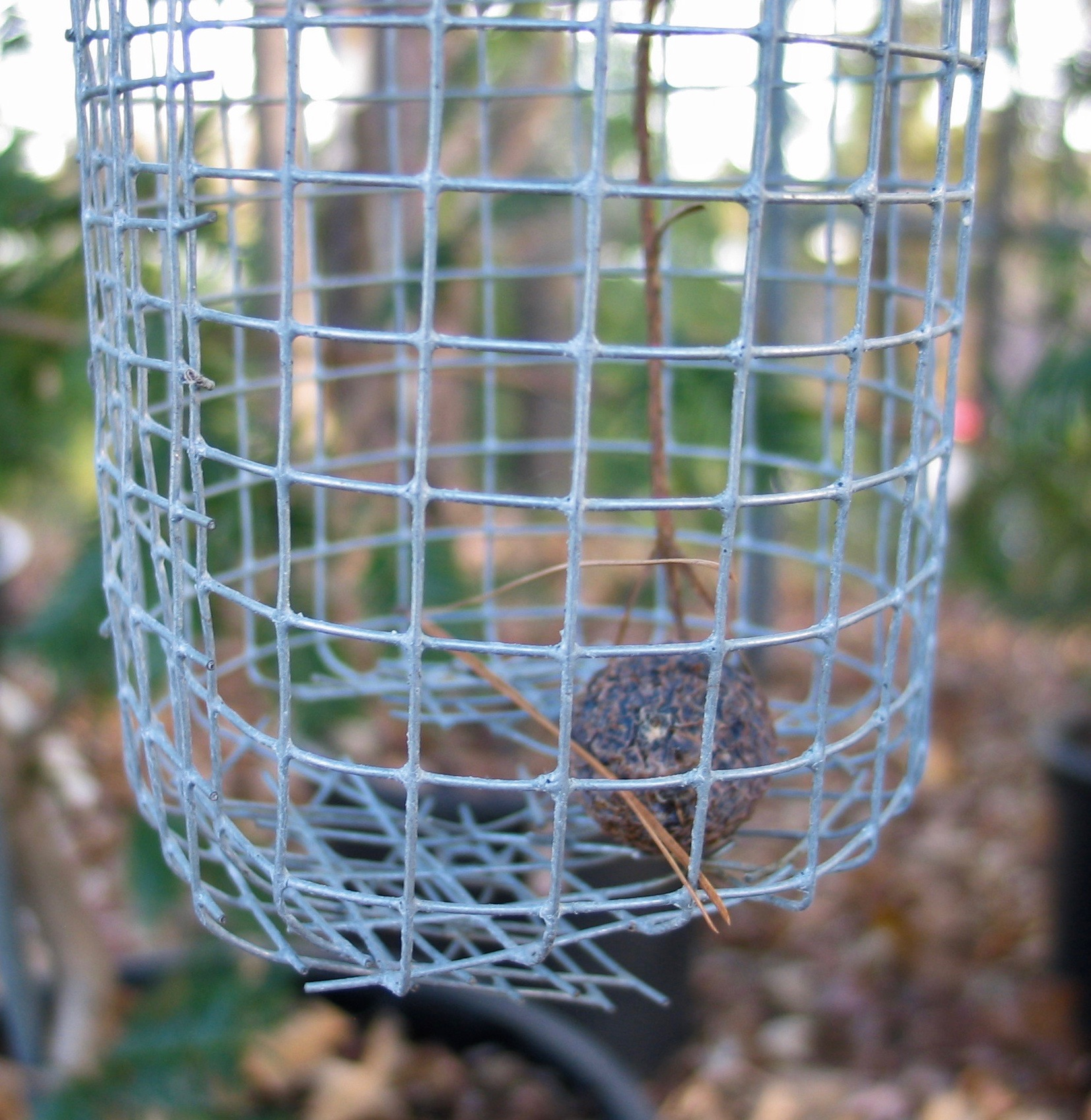
Wire cages are placed during seed ripening to deter squirrels; one seed is visible in the closeup (Dec 2007).
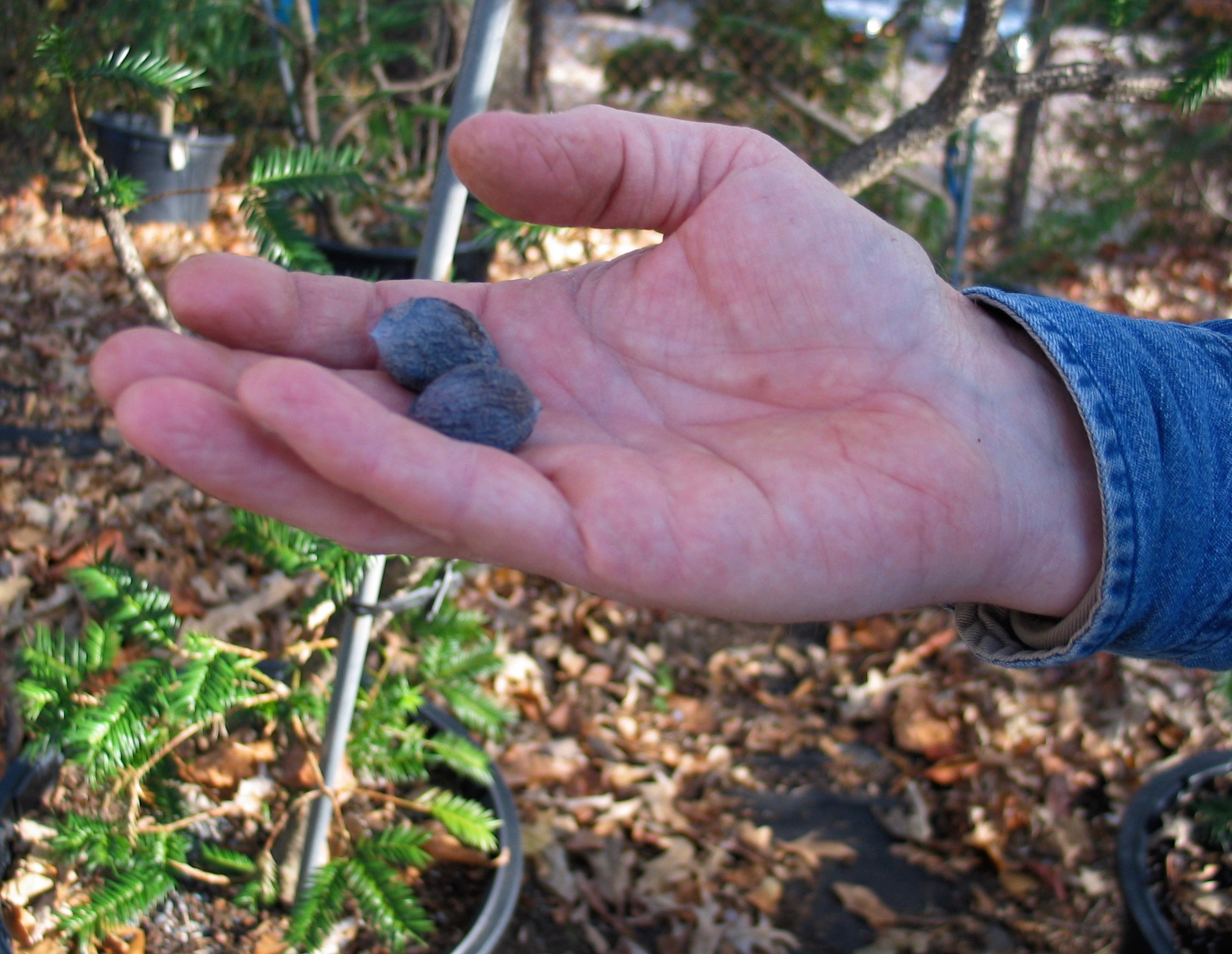
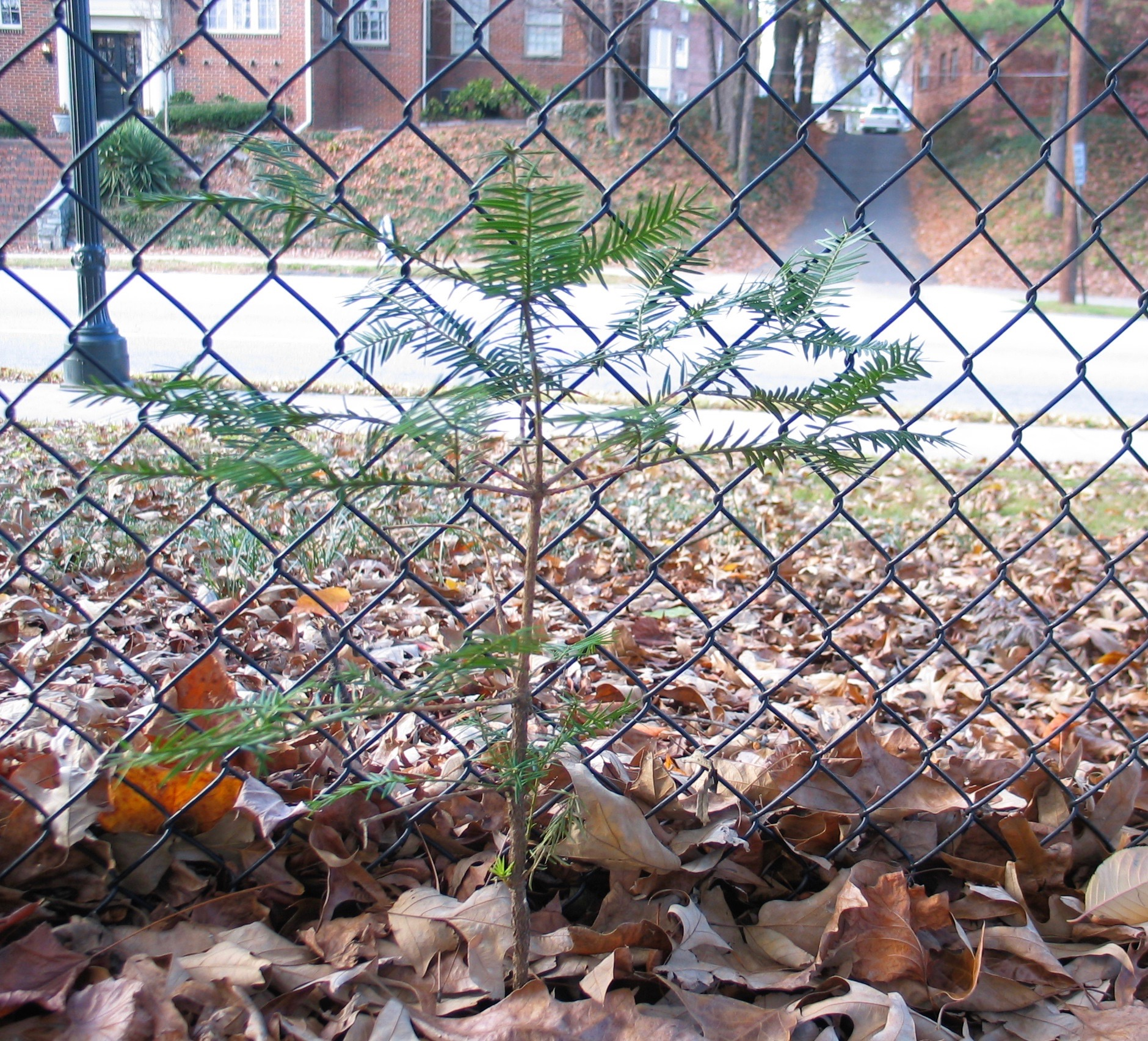
Left: Ripe seeds ready to plant. Right: A squirrel harvested a seed, but then failed to dig it up (December 2007).
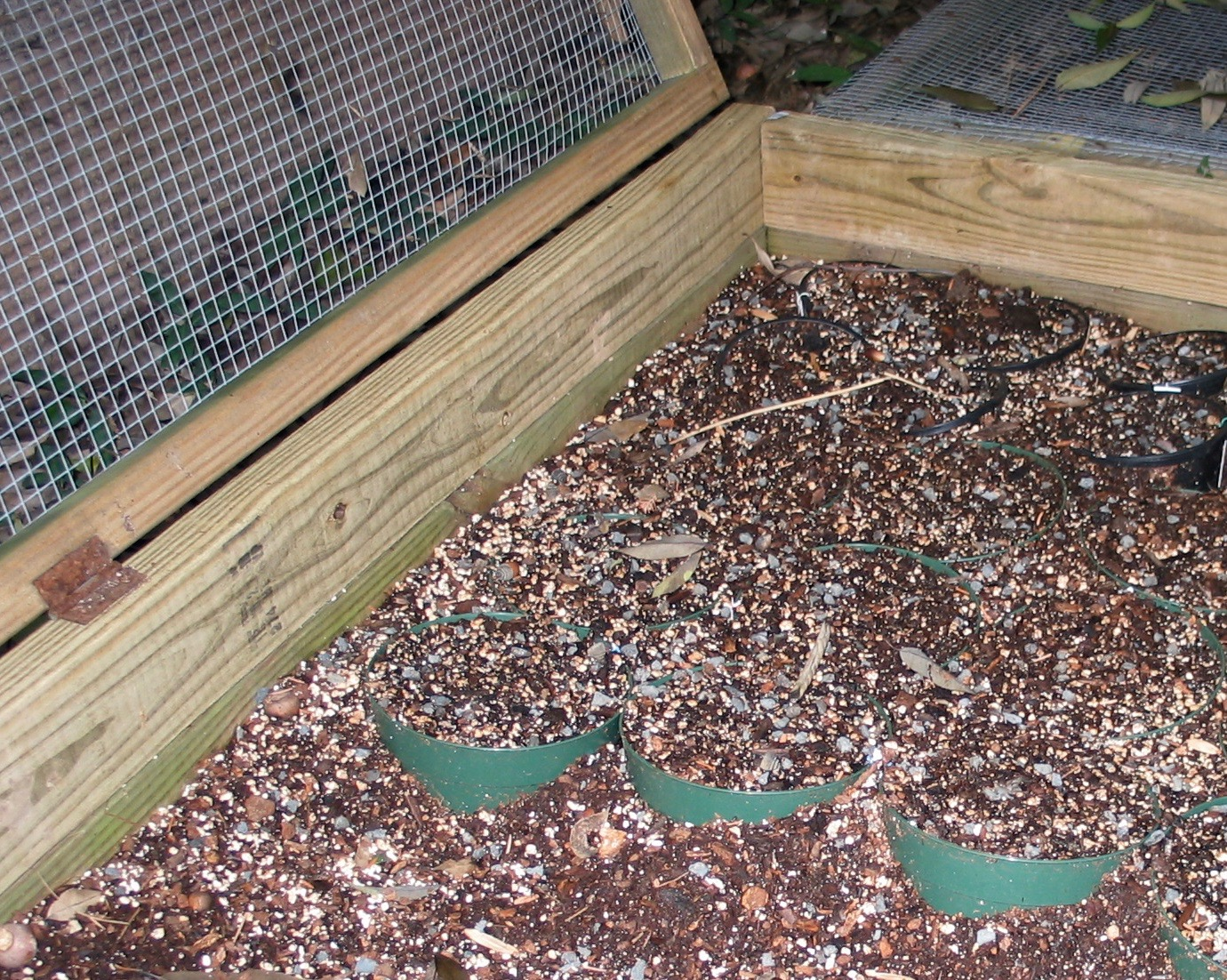
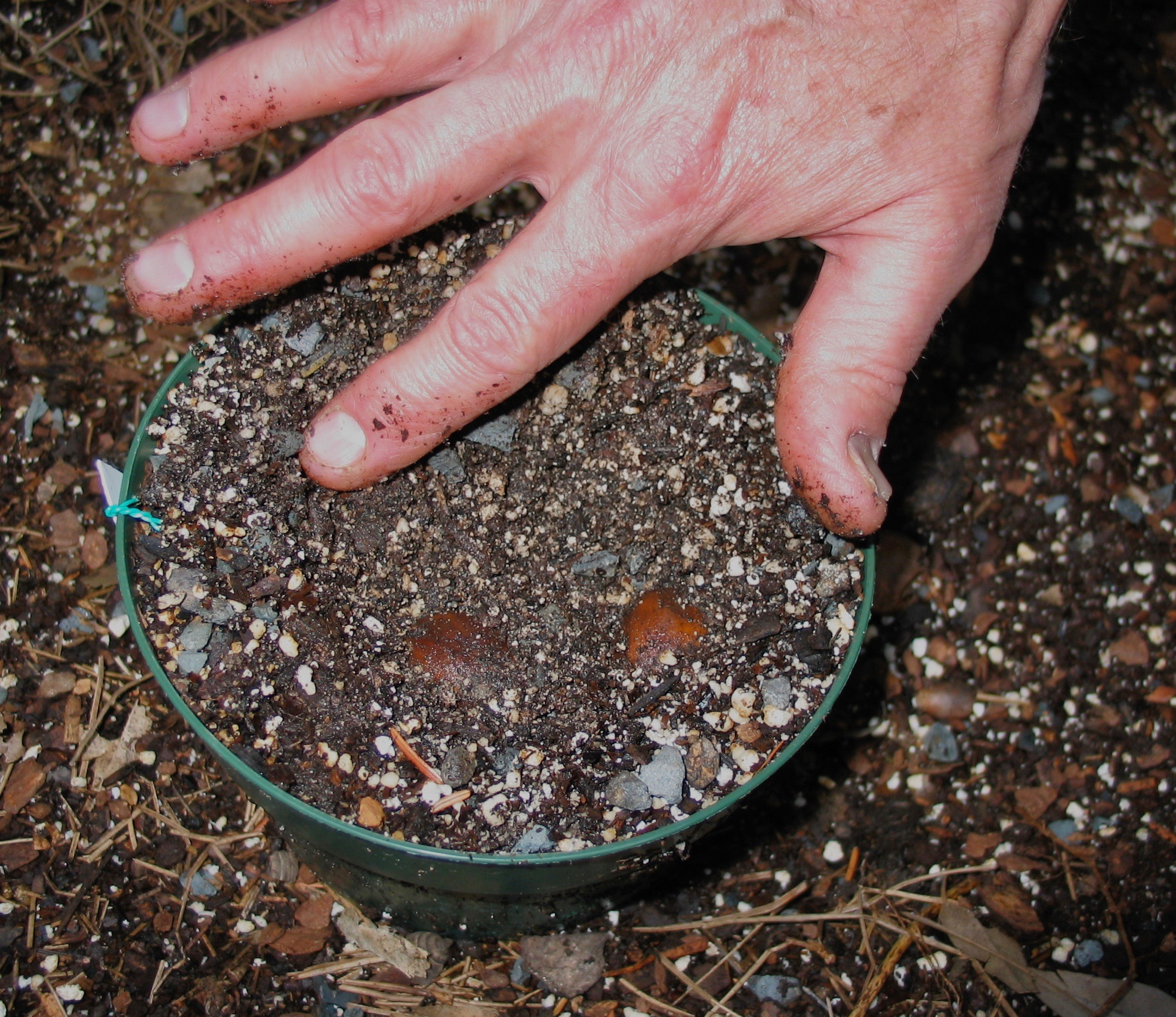
Seeds are germinated in rodent-proof structures as the first step in producing trees for ex situ orchards (Dec 2007).

When the original branchlets that had been cut and rooted in 1991 reached an age in which seed production ensued, safeguarding decisions became more problematic — and potentially controversial. This is because Torreya seeds are recalcitrant; they cannot be stored in the usual ways. They cannot be dried, they cannot be frozen, they cannot be freeze-dried. They can be stored in a refrigerator for a few years, especially because the species requires cold stratification. But the embryos will die if they are not eventually placed into soil and seasonal warmth that will induce germination.

This storage problem led to the development of a system for "cryogenic storage of T. taxifolia cultures and subsequent plant regeneration," based on extraction of embryos from seeds followed by somatic embryogenesis. As of October 2011, "about 25 embryogenic cultures from five mother trees were placed into liquid nitrogen for long-term storage and confirmed to survive after retrieval from liquid nitrogen."

That whole seeds of Torreya taxifolia could not be kept alive in any form of long-term storage meant that the only viable method for safeguarding Torreya taxifolia rested in keeping a large population of genetically diverse shrubs and trees alive, and in more than one location.

As well, because previous experiments in reintroducing the species into its historically native range had failed, and because the two botanical gardens in charge of safeguarding the ex situ plantings were opposed to assisted migration, annual seed production numbering in the thousands could not fully be put to use. From a professional conservation standpoint, leaving seeds on the ground was not hard to justify. The greatest genetic diversity remains in the original wild-stock clonal plantings — not in any subset of offspring that may descend from their seed production. Making use of surplus seeds has no clear role for "preventing extinction" nor for "safeguarding genetic diversity."

Staff of Atlanta Botanical Garden produced an article that was published in the Fall 2007 issue of Conifer Quarterly, which reported that many of the original cuttings had begun producing seeds, "over 500 viable seeds per year on average."

The 2010 recovery plan update reported seed production at Smithgall Woods in this way, "The trees have grown quite large and are now reproductively mature producing male and female cones annually."

Ten years later, the 2020 update included the same sentence, but still no numerical data on annual or cumulative seed production in any of the three north Georgia ex situ plantings: Smithgall Woods, Vogel State Park, and Mountain Research Station near Blairsville (a University of Georgia site). The plan reports that Atlanta Botanical Garden "has the largest collection of seed-bearing plants. Seeds have been collected from 15–20 trees and been propagated and shared with conservation or research partners, and ABG holds approximately 70 female trees in conservation collections."

The lack of documentation of seed production only became controversial in 2018, and then only as personal disagreements not covered by the media nor mentioned in academic policy papers on the topic of assisted migration. The founder of Torreya Guardians, Connie Barlow, utilized the U.S. Freedom of Information Act to seek information. In her FOIA submission, Barlow wrote:

"The Fish & Wildlife Service has not yet posted anything in its ongoing reports database as to the actual quantities of endangered Torreya taxifolia seeds produced year-by-year from ex situ plantings in Smithgall Woods and Blairsville GA, since those trees began producing seeds. It is important for the public to know the success of seed production, year by year, and especially the final destinations of those precious seeds, as produced under the terms of the 2010 update of the ESA recovery plan for this endangered species. My concern is that the seeds at Smithgall Woods may have been unharvested, and therefore 'wasted' as food for local squirrels."

A later communication by Barlow to the agency explained the events that motivated her request:

"In the past I was willing to 'live-and-let-live' with this aspect of the implementation of the ESA designation and not seek further information. Nor did I attempt to advocate that seeds of such an endangered tree should not be wasted on squirrels. But when it became clear that a person associated with Torreya Guardians was being accused of wrong-doing, and that he was also being blamed by Ms. Radcliffe for not notifying official staff until 2016 that seeds were being produced at the official ex-situ location, I realized that the hostility of officials toward our citizen group was no longer tolerable. Hence my FOIA request."

Barlow also references a formal document signed in May 2016 that she learned about only during the 2018 email exchanges with botanical garden staff. The document had been sent to all institutional members of the Georgia Plant Conservation Alliance (GPCA), and it was signed by six members, including staff from the U.S. Fish and Wildlife Service and Georgia Department of Natural Resources. The consequences for Barlow and other Torreya Guardians were made clear in the final paragraph:

"GPCA members and Botanical Guardian volunteers are advised to be cautious when speaking to any members of Torreya Guardians. They have taken advantage of professional courtesies, making broad claims from simple correspondence, and linking their work with members of the GPCA. GPCA is publicly distancing itself from Torreya Guardians and their methods of rewilding an endangered species outside its range."

==== Seeds accessed by citizens ====
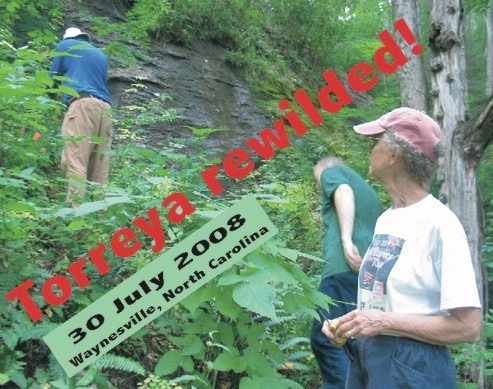
Torreya taxifolia was rewilded into forest habitat in North Carolina by Torreya Guardians, July 2008.

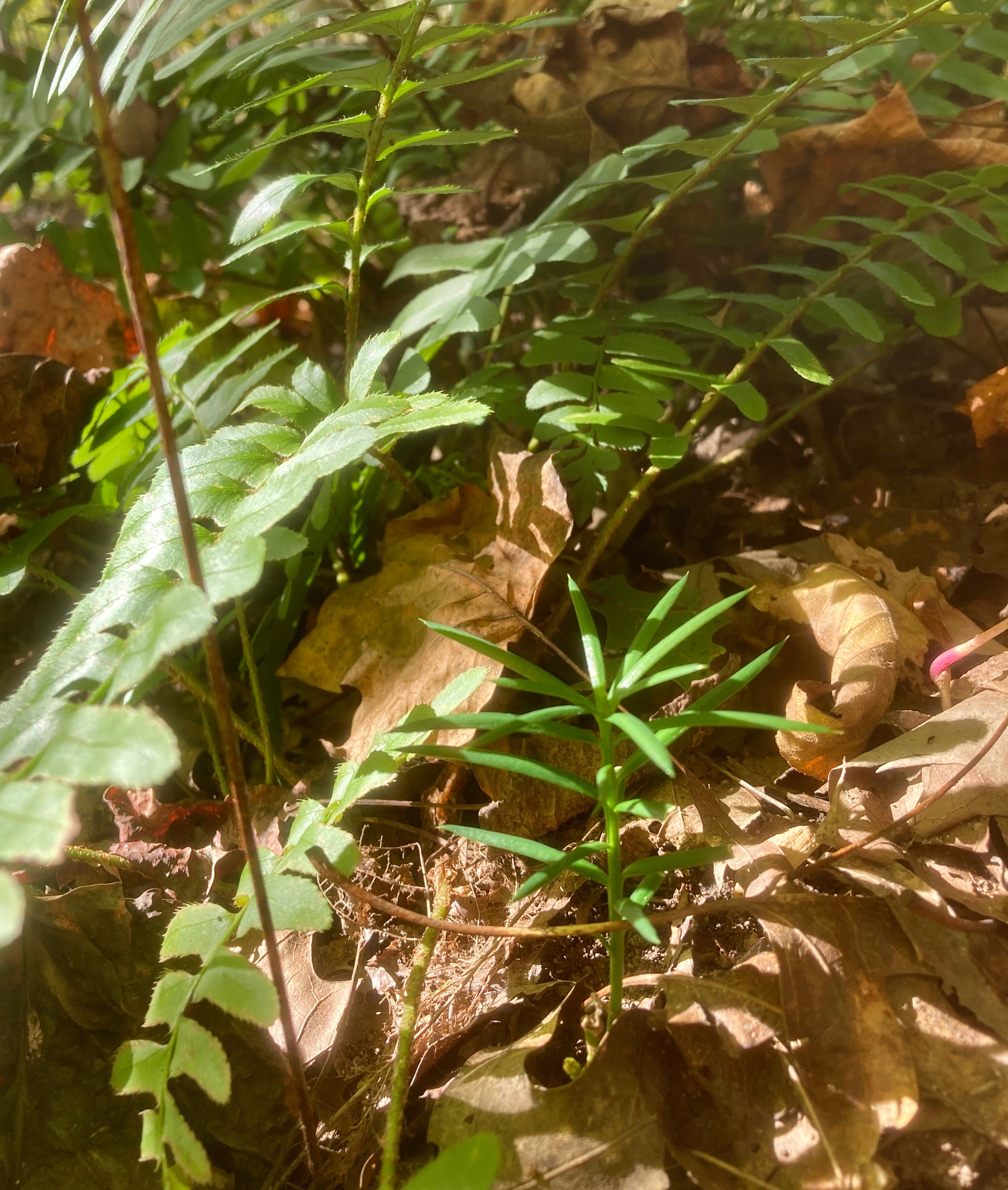
Torreya taxifolia emerging from seed directly planted under fronds of an evergreen fern in Virginia.

Citizen collection and use of endangered plant seeds produced in horticultural settings are exempt from restrictions in the U.S. Endangered Species Act.

In the case of Florida torreya, the 65-year-old grove at Biltmore Gardens near Asheville, North Carolina, produced enough seeds in 2005 such that the managers donated 110 seeds to a newly formed citizen group. Donations to Torreya Guardians culminated in 2009, when the group received 300 Biltmore seeds. The controversy accelerated in 2008 when Audubon Magazine sent a journalist and a photographer to document the group's planting of 31 potted seedlings into private forested lands near Waynesville, North Carolina.

In general, media coverage of Torreya Guardians as the first example of an assisted migration project underway presented the information as a human-interest story or tilted toward publishing favorable quotations by or about the citizen action. Examples include: Boston Globe (2008), Orion (2008), Wildlife in North Carolina (2009), Audubon (2010), Los Angeles Times (2011), Landscape Architecture (2014), The Economist (2015), Earth Island Journal (2018), Sierra (2018).

In contrast, academics and other professionals publishing in journals (and the media that cover academic topics) trended toward caution, with a near-universal theme that professionals should develop policy frameworks to aid with decisionmaking — and that managers in charge of species recovery should begin making use of those frameworks. Examples that included mention of the Torreya taxifolia controversy were: Conservation Biology (2007, 2010, 2020), Trends in Ecology and Evolution (2009), Nature Climate Change (2008), Nature (2011, 2017), Scientific American (2009), Ecological Applications (2010), BioScience (2012), Science (2010, 2016), Yale Journal on Regulation (2010), Forestry Chronicle (2011), Conservation Letters (2010, 2013, 2017), The Conversation (2021).

In 2013 Torreya Guardians began harvesting seeds at two private homes in central North Carolina, with harvests sometimes entailing several thousand seeds. In 2017, the group received a one-time donation of 3,900 seeds from a private site in Medford, Oregon, where heat and drought during 2016 had apparently pushed a pair of 20-year-old Florida torreya trees into massive seed production.

Access to seeds numbering in the thousands enabled the group to begin experimenting with the easiest planting style of all: putting seeds one-by-one directly into their ultimate destinations, beneath a deciduous forest canopy. This "free-planting" technique began with many failures before squirrel-proof approaches were discovered: plant each seed under a rock or no less than 4 inches deep. Even if seed predation was mostly deterred, young seedlings were vulnerable to herbivore browsing. Planting next to evergreen Polystichum ferns was found to offer a degree of safety by way of camouflage.

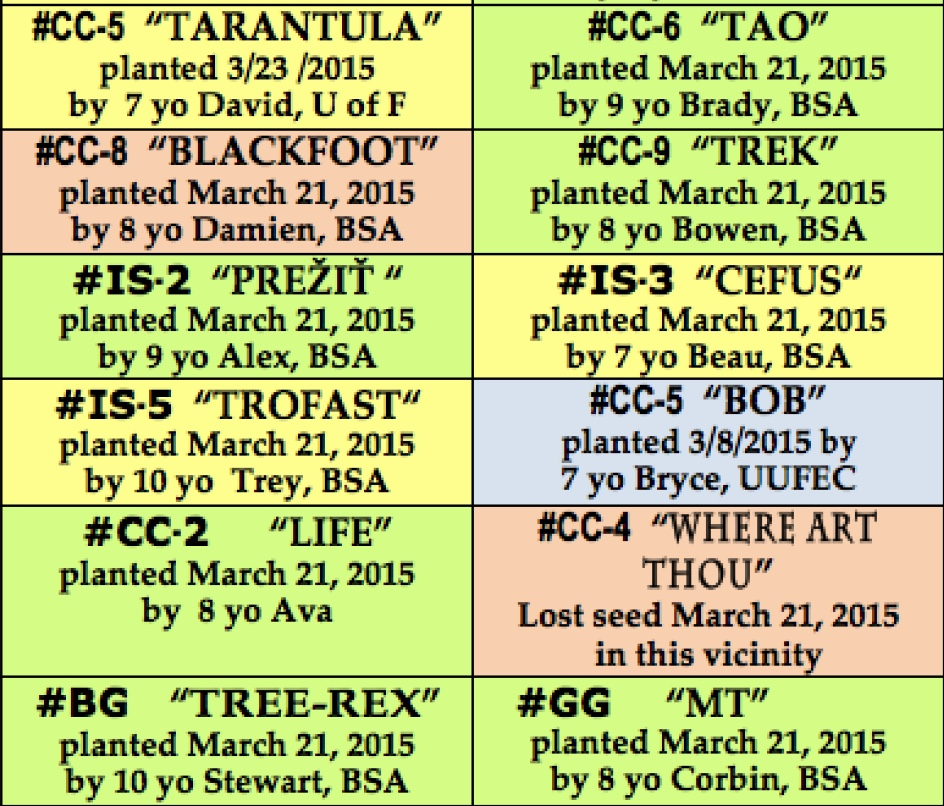
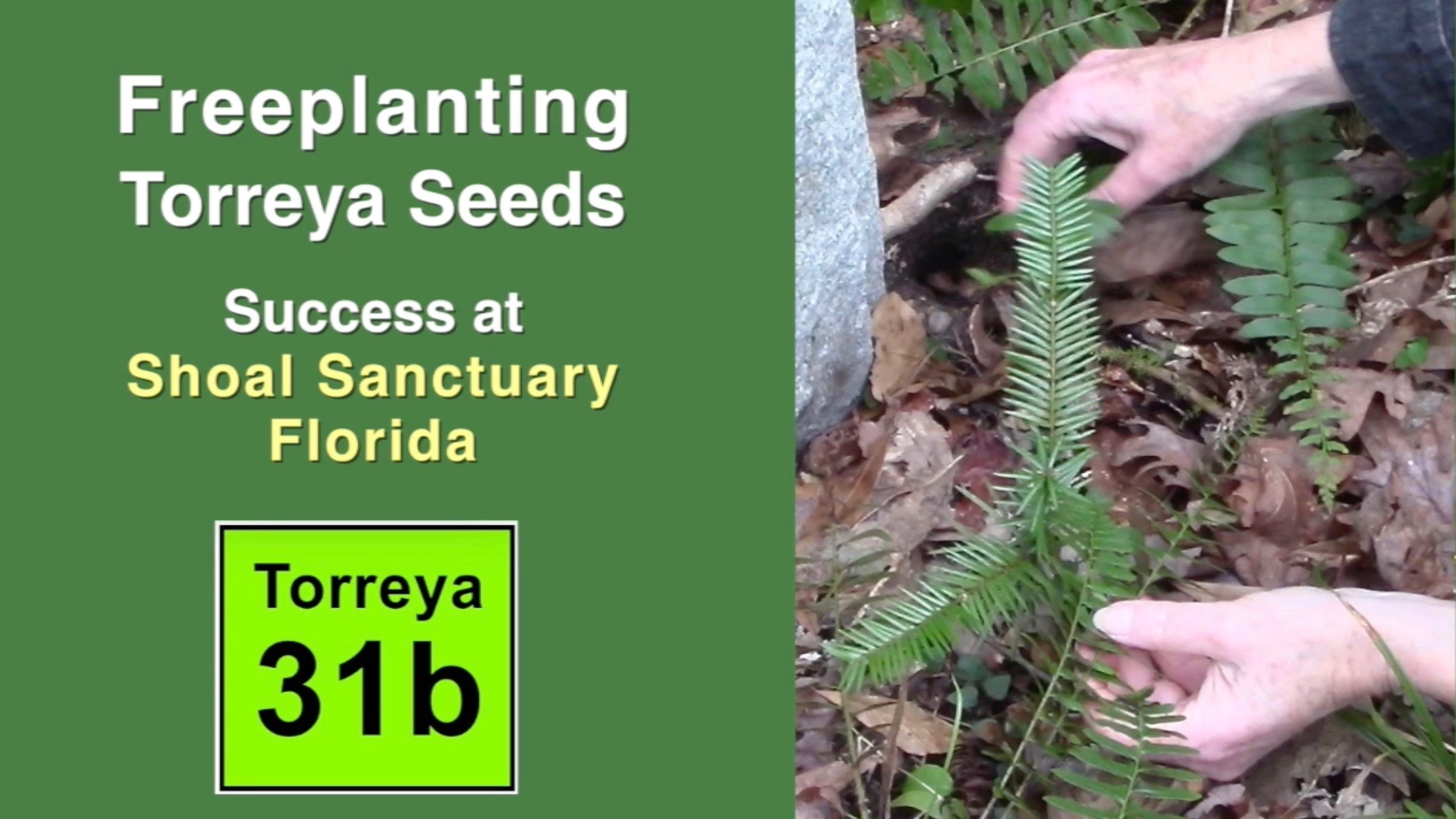
In 2015 Shoal Sanctuary in Florida guided children from nearby scout and church groups to plant torreya seeds into steephead and other ravines onsite. Children were encouraged to name each of their seeds. In 2019 Torreya Guardians posted a 2-part video of the young seedlings.

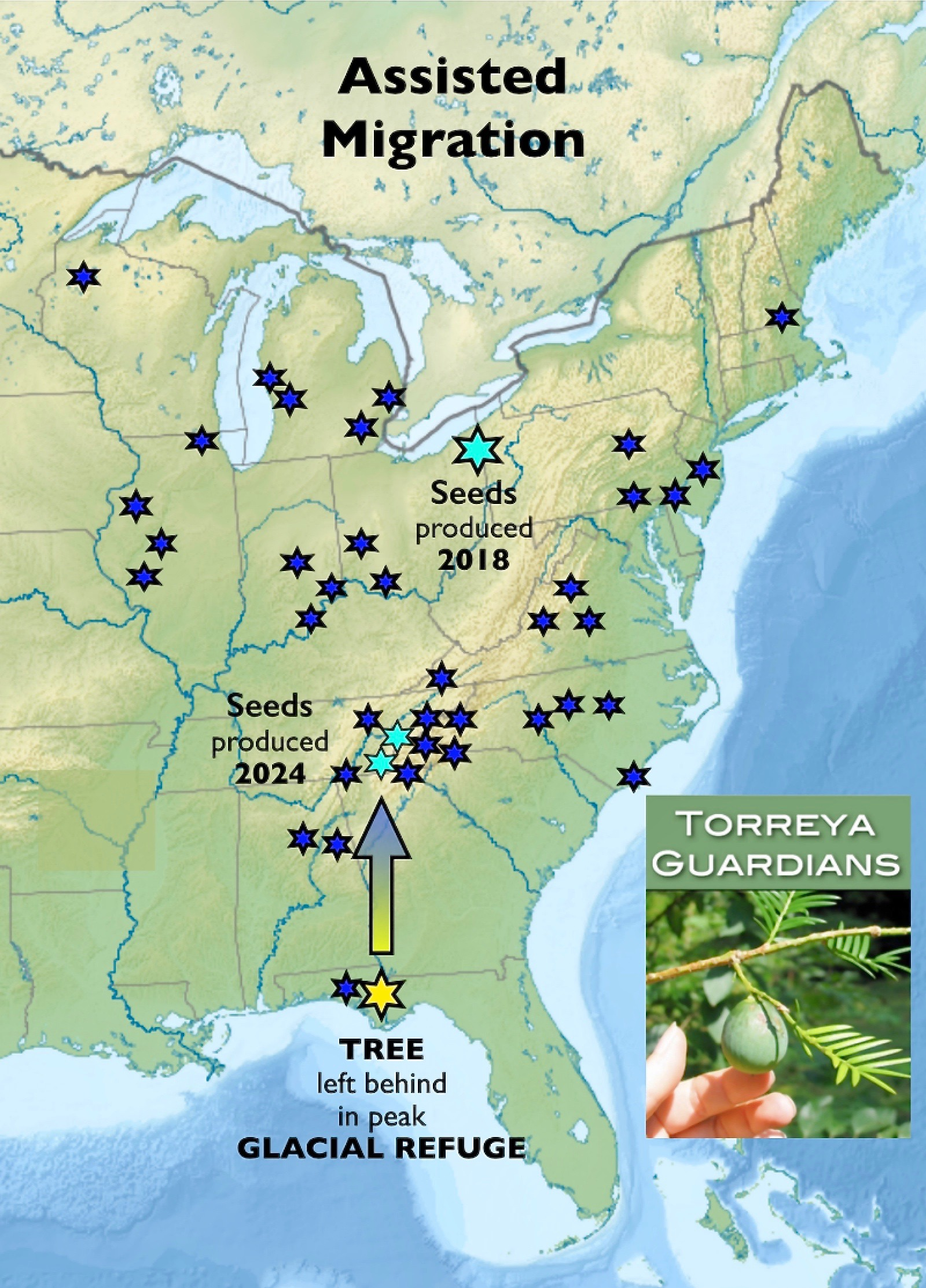
Image on the homepage of the Torreya Guardians website. Blue stars indicate sites where the group has sent donated seeds; turquoise indicates seed production.

Even with the best techniques, losses were large in most locations. But there was no way other than free-planting to put batches of seeds numbering in the thousands fully to use.

One site with remarkable results was located in Florida, so it was not part of poleward assisted migration experimentation. Nevertheless, the joy and success of the volunteer planters at this site attracted media attention.

Shoal Sanctuary, located near Mossy Head, Florida, is about 80 miles west of the historically native range of torreya, but this was too far away to qualify for donation of seeds from any of the official ex situ seed production sites. So in 2015 Torreya Guardians donated seeds for the owners' new project, which was unusual in that Chris and Robert Larson recruited local scout and church children to do the planting.

Plantings in northern states were more radical than the group's early projects in North Carolina. By the time successes began to show up far to the north, media interest had fallen away. The Florida torreyas that Fred Bess planted at his home in Cleveland, Ohio, began to produce a few seeds in 2017 and enough to give some away in 2018. In autumn of 2021 he harvested 168 seeds, and over a thousand in 2023. Thus, seed production in their own plantings began to supplement the seeds that Torreya Guardians had been sourcing from old horticultural plantings in North Carolina.

Seed production among the plantings in northward states was one of the five "Accomplishments by Torreya Guardians" listed in the 2019 "Petition to Downlist". Other accomplishments listed were: documenting historic groves in northward states; expanding knowledge of natural history and best propagation practices; educating and networking for translocation awareness; and advocacy for translocation and against genetic engineering.

The controversy about the unregulated nature of northward plantings of Torreya taxifolia seeds by citizens had been noted, watched, and commented upon for years in the broad context of how endangered plants should be managed, whether climate adaptation might become a compelling reason to make assisted migration a recommended strategy, and what the nature of the guidelines should be. Meanwhile, the personal animosities festered, manifesting in official documentation in the 2020 recovery plan update in two ways. In the 2010 plan update, two Torreya Guardians were listed in the acknowledgments as participants in the "Recovery Working Group" and the plan itself suggested to "foster a working partnership" with the group. In the 2020 plan update, Torreya Guardians was characterized as "a religious group based out of northern Georgia," and none were listed as working group participants in the acknowledgments.
