= Torreya Guardians =

Conservation of American forests group

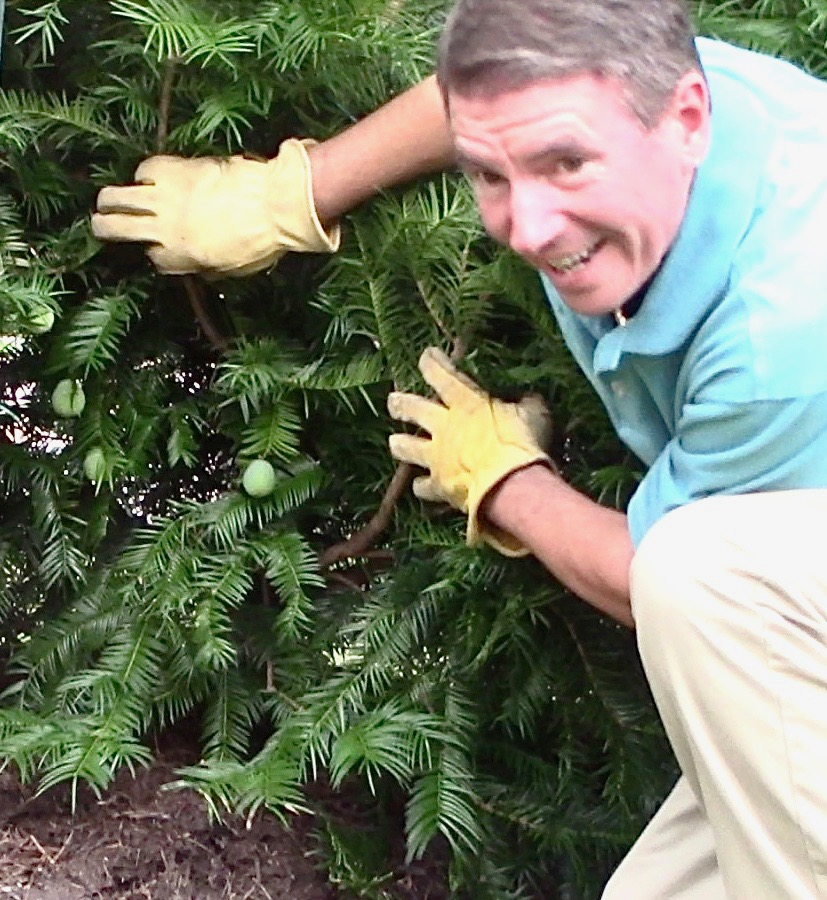
- Torreya Guardian Fred Bess shows seeds growing in his grove of Florida Torreya trees, Cleveland Ohio (2018)
- Formation: 2004
- Founder: Connie Barlow
- Type: Self-organized group
- Purpose: Conservation of the Torreya taxifolia
- Region served: United States
- Methods: Unregulated assisted migration
- Website: torreyaguardians.org

The Torreya Guardians is a self-organized group of conservationists dedicated to facilitating the assisted migration of the Florida torreya by rewilding it further north than its native range in Florida and Georgia. Founded in the early 2000s, the group is often mentioned as an instigator of the assisted migration of forests in North America for conservation and climate adaptation purposes. It is an example of citizen-initiated citizen science.

== Background ==
=== The endangered Florida torreya ===
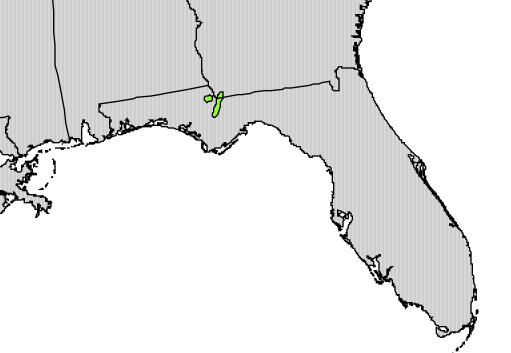
Torreya taxifolia range map, 1999

The Florida Torreya (Torreya taxifolia) is an endangered tree of the yew family, Taxaceae, found in the Southeastern United States, at the state border region of northern Florida and southwestern Georgia.

T. taxifolia became one of the first federally listed endangered plant species in the United States in 1984; the IUCN has listed the species as critically endangered since 1998. It is considered "the rarest conifer in North America." In 2010 98% of the mature trees of the species were believed to have been destroyed due to a poorly understood fungal blight as well as inundation due to dams and destruction by deer using trees as antler rubbing posts. In 2019 a staff biologist for the park in northern Florida named for this tree, Torreya State Park, spoke of this species as being "functionally extinct in the wild."

=== Climate change ===
Climate change is increasing the average temperatures of American forests. Forests in the contiguous United States have experienced a 0.8 °C increase since 1900. That some native trees already lag in northward range expansion was known in the 20th Century, and has increased during 21st Century warming. A classic paper by forestry scientist Margaret B. Davis was published in 1989 and titled, "Lags in vegetation response to greenhouse warming." She concluded, "To track climatic changes in the future, caused by the greenhouse effect, however, their range limit would need to move northward 100 km per °C warming.... Many species of trees may not be able to disperse rapidly enough to track climate, and woodland herbs, which have less efficient seed dispersal mechanisms, may be in danger of extinction." In 2020, the U.S. National Park Service began seriously considering how to adapt park ecologies to a rapidly changing climate—including helping iconic tree species (Joshua Tree and Giant Sequoia, for which several parks are named) to move upslope or poleward faster than they can do on their own. Action orientation by the agency was then shaped into the "Accept-Resist-Direct" strategy. A decade earlier, the U.S. Forest Service initiated experimental plantings for assisted migration of some of the most valued canopy trees in North America.

== Origins ==
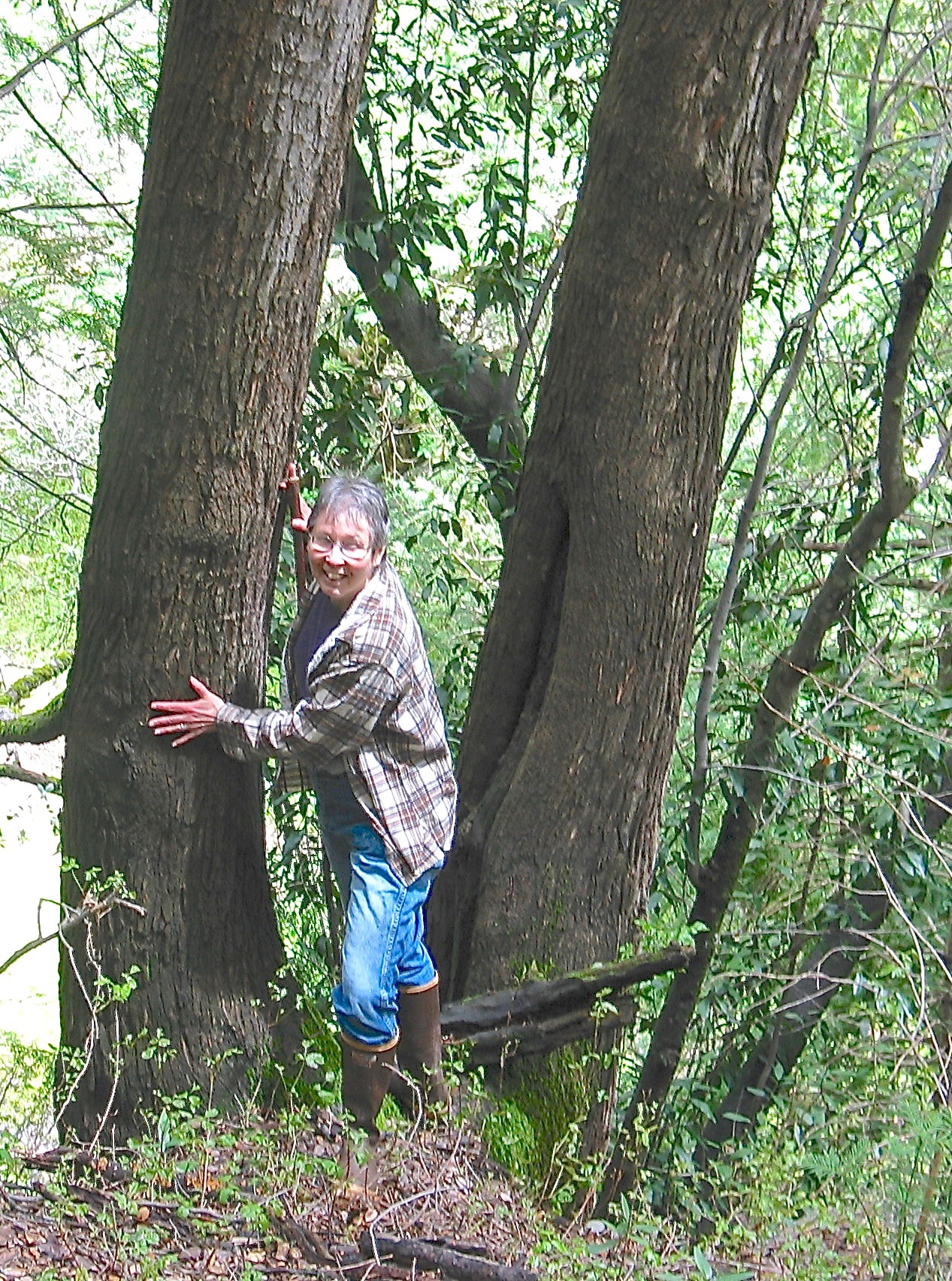
In 2005 Connie Barlow visited California's Sierra and Coast Range mountains where the closely related California Torreya could be found. Steep slope habitats (such as here in Sequoia National Park) were what she recommended to planters in the east.

The Torreya Guardians were founded in 2004 by Connie Barlow, an American science writer and amateur horticulturalist. The group is composed of citizens hailing from diverse professions, mostly based in the states of North Carolina, Tennessee, Michigan, and Ohio. Before their formation, they were searching for ways to better protect Torreya taxifolia from extinction. They worried that traditional conservation measures focused on rehabilitating the tree in its historical range were destined to fail, as well as being very expensive.

Then, early members learned by visiting Torreya californica in forested sites in California, and through reports, that other trees of the Torreya genus would migrate to higher altitudes when warmer average temperatures put them at risk. They saw in this a solution to the plight of the Florida torreya, and hypothesized that the tree would thrive if relocated to lands north of its historical range. They argued that torreyas would be better suited to survive in a cooler climate and that the species in California often was found on very steep slopes.

Major American conservation institutions were unwilling to test their hypothesis. Plant assisted migration projects had never been implemented before in the United States for the purpose of conservation, so it was rejected. Instead, the United States Fish and Wildlife Service was trying to protect this species by managing the diseases affecting it in its native range at the time, with limited success.

Since the species listing in 1984, the official conservation efforts undertaken in behalf of the Florida torreya centered first on collecting and rooting cut branchlets from specimens in the wild. As those cuttings turned into shrubs, they were transferred into large pots or moved into managed horticultural plantings for genetic safeguarding until problems in the habitat itself could be discerned and corrected. Connie Barlow, on the other hand, believed that it made little sense to focus on finding a way to return torreya to its endemic habitat during a time of climate warming. Pointing to torreya's status as a glacial relict that had been unable to return northward after the glacial times ended, she expressed the need for citizen action in a 2010 article in Audubon Magazine. "Potted is the botanical equivalent of caged," she said. "I'm interested in preserving not just a species but its wildness."

The two sides had come to a head in 2004 when the environmentalist magazine Wild Earth published a pair of detailed pro and con articles on what to do about the Florida torreya. Connie Barlow and paleoecologist Paul S. Martin wrote the essay in favor of moving the species, citing evidence that the Florida torreya had been pushed south during the previous ice age. When the ice retreated, this large-seeded, subcanopy tree had trouble migrating back north to cooler realms. For most of its history, therefore, this species of genus Torreya had not been native to Florida. Mark W. Schwartz, an American conservation biologist who had been researching and participating in the preservation of the Florida torreya within its native range since 1988, wrote the piece opposing the assisted migration proposal. He was particularly worried about the precedent that citizen-led assisted migration of the endangered tree would set, the risk that even an endangered plant might become invasive in a different ecosystem, and the possibility of spreading the diseases afflicting the tree in Florida. These concerns were shared by Jenny Cruse-Sanders of the Atlanta Botanical Garden, who cautioned as well that the horticulturally derived seedlings planted by the citizen group might be genetically inferior to the wild genetics that her institution is safeguarding in ex situ plantings in Georgia.

== Implementation of assisted migration ==
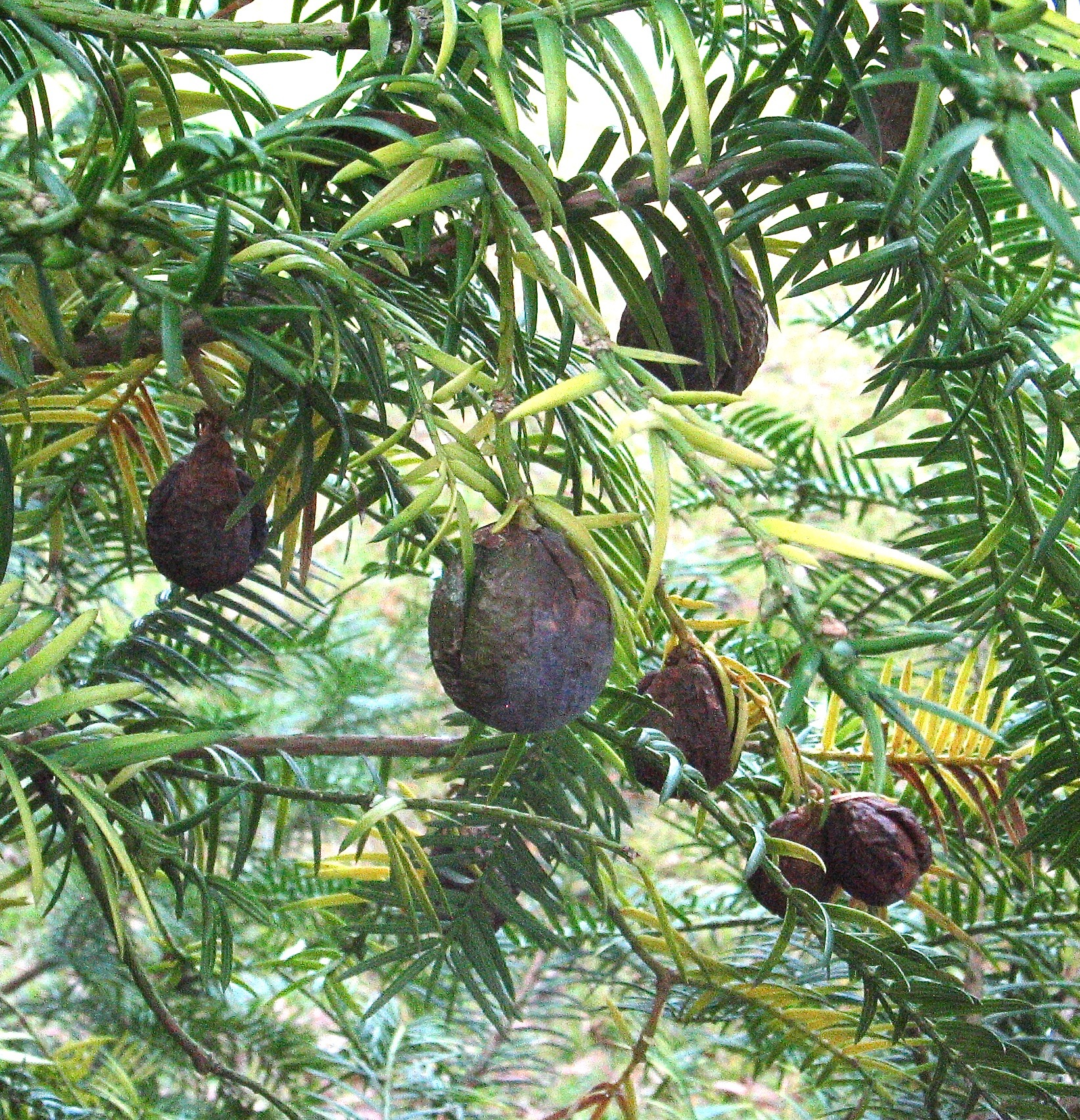
Seeds of Florida torreya ripen to a purple color at this horticultural planting in eastern North Carolina.

Action by Torreya Guardians in translocating an endangered tree poleward has been called "the best documented case of a managed relocation."

While still a rare practice by conservation institutions, planting trees outside their native range is not illegal in the United States. Indeed, the horticulture trade has long been engaged in selling and planting both native and exotic plants with no legal limitations, except where governments have officially listed particular plants as invasive species in the United States. While endangered plants native to the United States have more stringent controls than other plants, commercial nurseries can sell properly sourced (that is, horticulturally grown rather than wild) specimens so long as the sale is not across state lines (interstate commerce). Provided there is no monetary transaction, private citizens can legally carry or send horticulturally sourced specimens of listed endangered species. The nascent Torreya Guardians took advantage of this legal exception to the Endangered Species Act to implement their own assisted migration project outside established institutions.

The Torreya Guardians saw North Carolina as particularly hospitable for the Florida torreya because trees of this genus have lived at the Biltmore Gardens, in nearby Asheville, for almost a century. Here can be found the second oldest surviving grove of horticulturally planted trees. In 2005 the Biltmore Gardens donated 110 seeds to Lee Barnes, a member of the Torreya Guardians. Most of the seeds were donated to horticultural staff of botanical gardens northward. Three years later, the group purchased potted seedlings from a nursery in South Carolina, and then drove the plants to two sites in the mountains of North Carolina, where the torreyas were planted into regrowth forests on private lands. Such in-forest plantings represent the group's emphasis not just in preventing extinction but also in re-integrating—that is, "rewilding"—this subcanopy species into native forest ecologies of the eastern United States.

Torreya Guardians homepage image.

In subsequent years, seeds or potted seedlings were also given to planters in additional eastern states, and as far north as Wisconsin, Michigan, and New Hampshire. Several volunteer planters are trained (and sometimes employed) as professional ecologists or foresters, but most have acquired horticultural skills outside of a profession and are eager to assist an endangered plant. The volunteer in Cleveland, Ohio, Fred Bess, is a professional landscaper, and in 2017 his grove produced a handful of seeds. By 2023, more than a thousand seeds were produced annually, thus setting the record for the farthest north seed production in a fully outdoor setting.

In 2013, a journal article published in Conservation Letters described the actions of Torreya Guardians as a form of "citizen-initiated assisted colonization." The authors explained that the Endangered Species Act, while prohibiting citizen initiatives pertaining to imperiled animal species, "has encouraged citizens to undertake plant conservation, especially for charismatic plants threatened by climate change." Torreya Guardians was then described as having "established private experimental populations on the property of cooperative landowners to help preserve the species outside of its historic range because of its decline, lack of federal funding, and the availability of privately owned and commercially available plants and seeds."

Four law review articles published between 2009 and 2017 concluded that the Endangered Species Act of 1973 (ESA) need not be amended to use assisted migration in species recovery. The citizen actions by Torreya Guardians in moving an endangered plant substantially northward of its native range remained an outlier to the official endangered species policies until June 2023. It was then that regulations governing the parameters of recovery plans were amended "to reduce the impacts of climate change and other threats such as invasive species." Deletion of "historical range" as a location parameter for "experimental populations" effectively authorized assisted migration for listed species. A press report on the regulatory change mentioned the citizen actions of Torreya Guardians as having preceded the official shift in willingness to consider northward experiments for other endangered species. Following the regulatory change, another journalist wrote that the "aggressive approach to conservation" by the Torreya Guardians "featured prominently in numerous scientific articles that followed, discussing the pros and cons of assisted migration."

== Governance ==
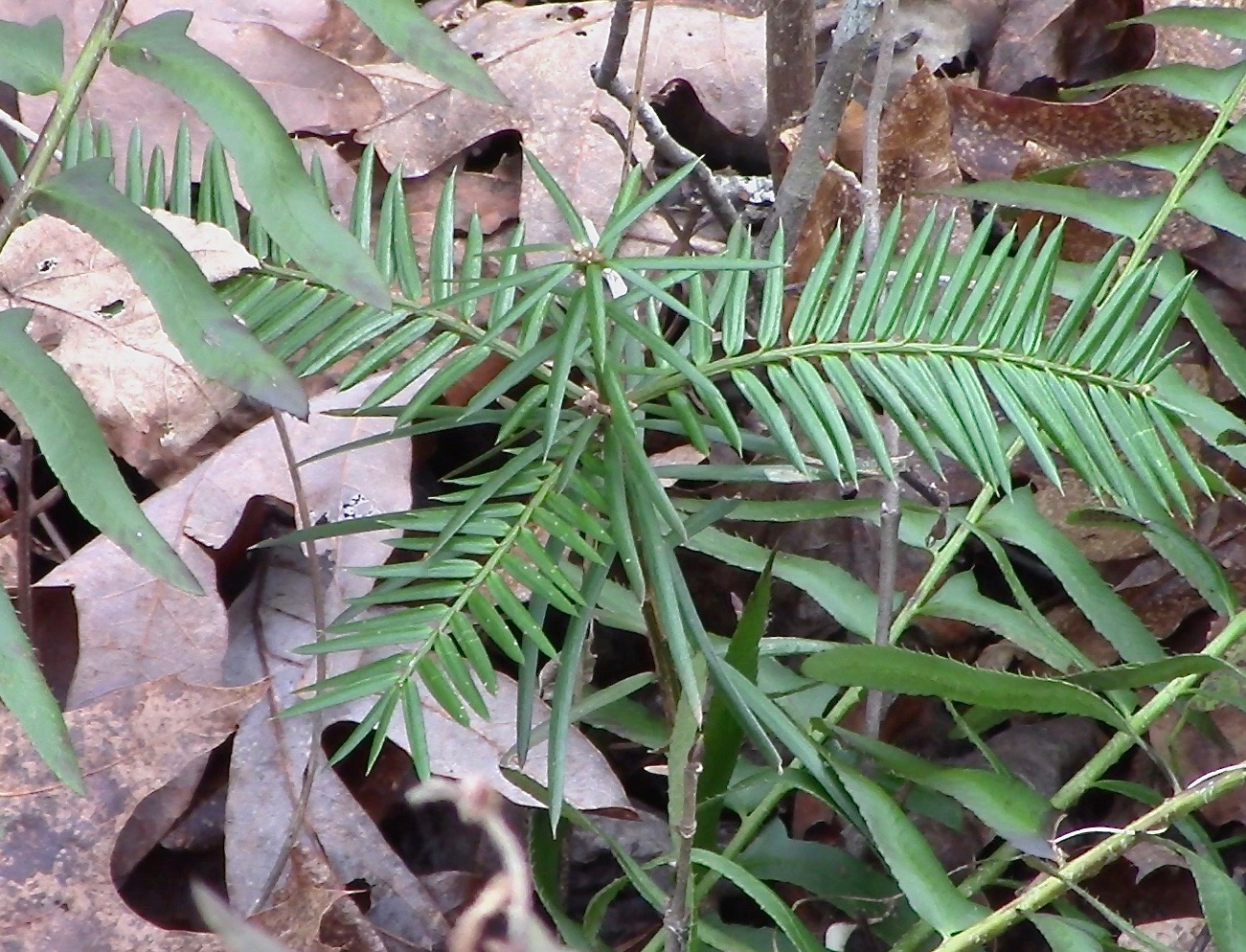
Florida torreya, despite its sharp-pointed leaves, is vulnerable to herbivory by deer in winter and spring, so free-planting seeds near an evergreen native fern (Polystichum acrostichoides) for camouflage is recommended by Torreya Guardians.

On their website, the Torreya Guardians explain that "there are no by-laws, officers, board, staff, overhead costs, dues, formal organizational structure, or physical location to this organization".

On the topic of official communications, the Torreya Guardians website further notes that the organization "does not speak or take action as a group, but instead encourages subsets of those involved to post ideas and initiatives on this website and to help establish links with synergistic organizations and websites".

According to member Clint Bancroft, the Torreya Guardians network is mostly maintained by the work of the founder, Connie Barlow.

== Results ==
Because the Torreya Guardians are a decentralized group, they do not have a systematic data-collection approach. Instead, participants share their ongoing results by word, photo, video, and sometimes in quantitative format for posting on the Torreya Guardians website. In some states, such as North Carolina, the Florida torreya samplings are thriving. In other states with an even colder climate, such as New Hampshire, the tree manages to survive, but is having more trouble growing than in warmer places. Even so, seed production has been achieved in Cleveland, Ohio by a volunteer planter, along with two other sites of seed production achieved by volunteers in western North Carolina, as shown in the map above.

Marking two decades since the group's formation, in 2025 several aggregates of results were published on the website. The chronological "Learnings" page was updated and also published in a PDF format that entails 58 pages. An entirely new webpage, "Northward Limits for Florida Torreya Assisted Migration," was created in May 2025 and linked from the homepage along with other top-level pages. Two other aggregate pages originated in 2018, with ongoing updates: "Historic Groves" and "Case Study of Agency and Institutional Failure." The longest chronological aggregate was initiated as a webpage in 2005: "Reports by Torreya Guardians Volunteers." In 2025, a detailed "sitemap" was also added to the homepage.

== Reception within Conservation Biology ==
The conservation community has expressed mixed feelings towards the volunteer-driven assisted migration project. When they started their endeavor, the assisted migration of trees in North America was considered a "radical conservation idea". The Torreya Guardians have been called a "rogue" group for not following the guidelines of the International Union for Conservation of Nature. And yet, a 2017 editorial within a leading international journal, Nature, characterized the group's actions in this way, "In one of the only real-world examples of assisted migration so far, campaigners have planted the seeds of the critically endangered conifer Torreya taxifolia hundreds of miles north of its Florida home."

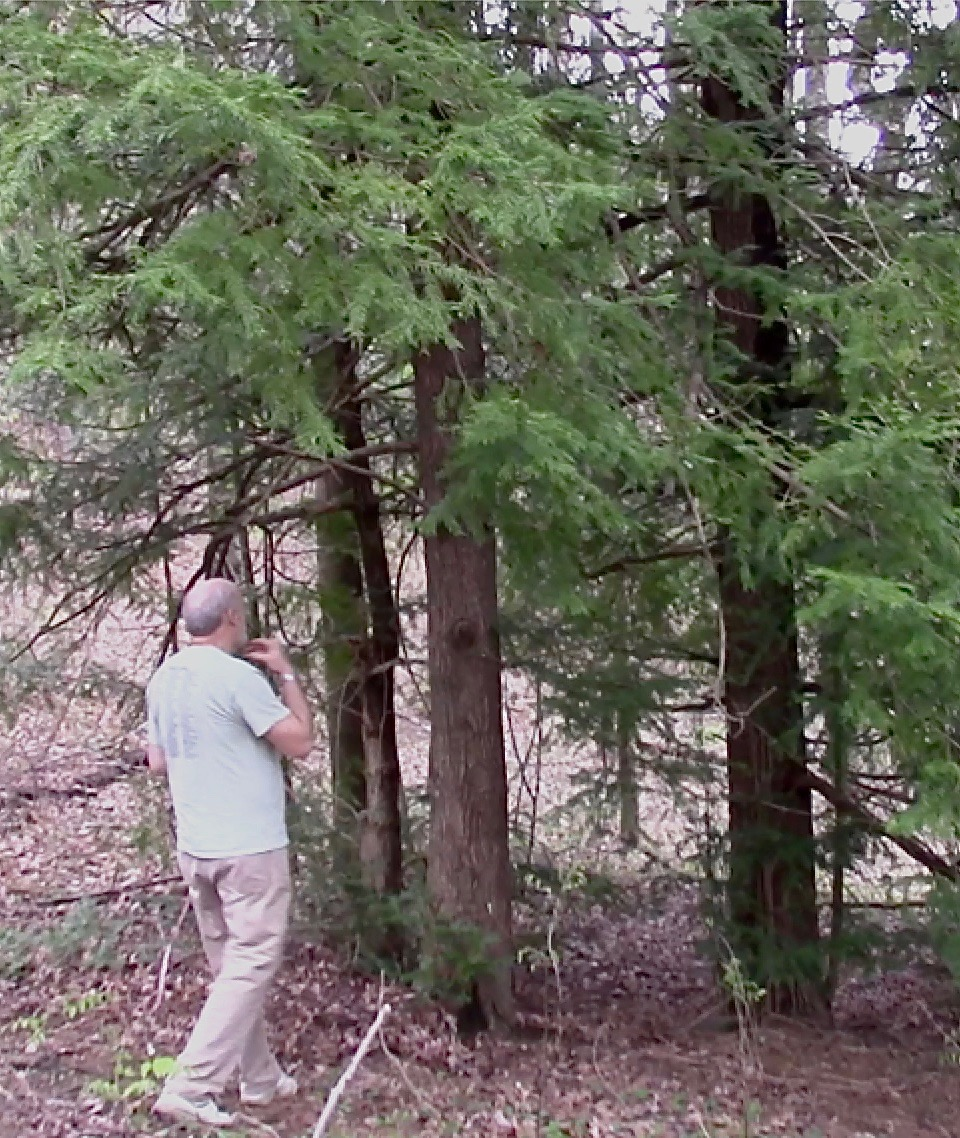
The Harbison House grove of Florida Torreya near Highlands, North Carolina, is nearly a century old. (2015)

Professionals in conservation biology have criticized the actions of Torreya Guardians since their inception. Mark Schwartz, who wrote the 2004 Wild Earth article opposing the group's proposed assisted migration project, reiterated his critique as lead author or coauthor of professional papers published in 2007, 2009, and 2012. Schwartz was also a coauthor of two papers published in 2021 that expressed continuing caution about translocating animal and plant species for climate adaptation purposes—with unfavorable effects on "recipient ecosystems" being one of the primary risks to consider. When speaking to a journalist about these papers, Schwartz referred to the endeavors of Torreya Guardians as "misguided."

Conservation biologist Daniel Simberloff was among the first to strongly criticize assisted migration as a climate adaptation tool in general, and the actions of Torreya Guardians in particular: "They've just decided on their own to move trees with no consideration, no oversight, by anyone with expertise in tree biology," Simberloff said. "That is a terrible precedent to set."

The group's actions did stimulate many conservationists to rethink the traditional methods of conservation. The Torreya Guardians had proved that assisted migration of an endangered plant could be done without sophisticated conservation techniques and for little cost.

In 2015 the Tennessee chapter of the Sierra Club published an article in its autumn newsletter, written by a Torreya Guardian, in which new planters in that state were sought for a citizen science project demonstrating "how citizens can actively engage in forestry climate action, using the best science available—but requiring no taxpayer funds." Two forest owners asked for seeds as a result, including the owner of a 232-acre (94 ha) stewardship forest near the Cumberland Plateau (pictured below).

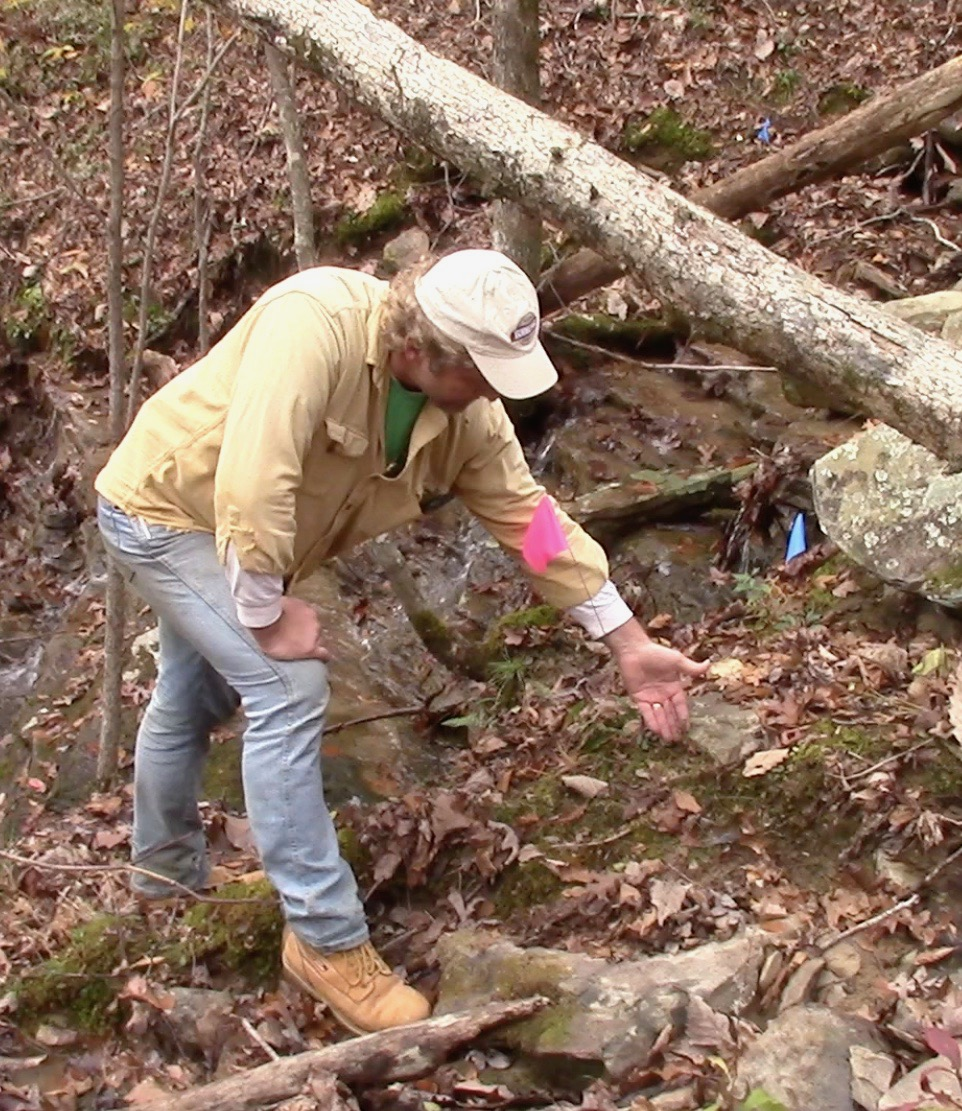
Chris and Christina Anderson free-planted 400 seeds of Florida Torreya into their stewardship forest east of the Cumberland Plateau, Tennessee.

Meanwhile, academic scientists and working groups within the conservation community continued their deliberations to address the question of climate change adaptation, and to consider the scientific, legal, and ethical ramifications of assisted migration. This includes considering the ramification of risking species going extinct because humans did not relocate them to a climate where they could thrive.

Overall, a growing number of scholars conclude that the risk of spreading invasive species is small when native plants are moved poleward—and that it may be a risk worth taking. For ecologist Richard Primack, having endangered species go extinct would be a worse tragedy. "These endangered species have such a specialized niche, have such difficulty growing," he said in 2010, "that the chance of them becoming invasive is infinitesimally small." Primack explained that there is a much more serious danger: "that our efforts to move them will fail."

In 2021 a "policy forum" article published in the journal Science reviewed the assisted colonization controversy. Mark Schwartz was one of the eight coauthors. The journal published an accompanying news article that focused on the growing importance of this controversy in light of ongoing climate change. There, lead author Jedediah Brody summed up the concern in his field of conservation biology this way: "Assisted colonization could be a critical tool in our toolbox for ameliorating the impacts of climate change on biodiversity, but it could also be dangerous if done wrong." Speaking for the team, Brodie said that the international community needed "a clear and coherent framework" by which assisted colonization projects can be "evaluated, vetted, regulated and reported." In this regard, Brodie characterized the efforts of Torreya Guardians and others as being "relatively benign, so far." Yet he cautioned that the history of moving species to new areas had sometimes yielded "disastrous consequences."

Authors of a review paper published in the journal Biological Conservation in 2023 presented a more open assessment:

The Florida Torreya (Torreya taxifolia) is an endangered tree located in the southeastern U.S. A citizen science group known as the Torreya Guardians was formed in the early 2000s with the goal of protecting the species. They argued the species would survive best in a cooler climate and took advantage of a legal exception to the Endangered Species Act which allowed them to implement their own assisted migration project outside established institutions. Seeds and seedlings were moved from Florida (and South Carolina) to North Carolina, and later Wisconsin, Michigan, and New Hampshire.... Although this assisted migration was criticized for its lack of scientific planning prior to implementation, it has turned out to be an interesting, uncontrolled experiment.

== Reception within the Forestry profession ==
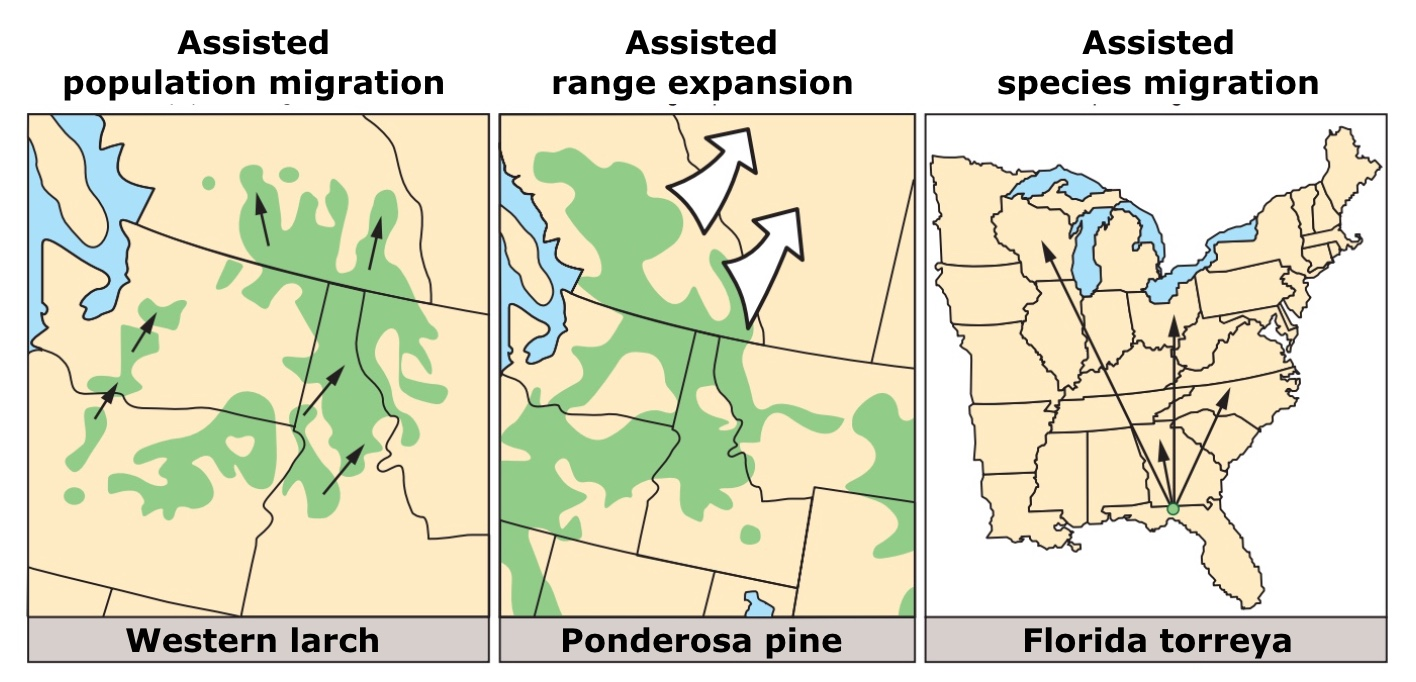
The first two panels illustrate how "assisted population migration" (Western larch as the example) and "assisted range expansion" (Ponderosa pine as the example) were more moderate applications appropriate to forestry than had been the singular concern when Torreya Guardians initiated advocacy and action. Florida torreya is the species exemplar shown in the third panel of the image, and thus the signature tree for what foresters began calling "assisted species migration."

While management of an endangered plant or animal species is a central concern for conservation biologists, forestry researchers and managers focus on the overall health and resource potential of forest ecosystems—both in theory and in practice. The image (at right) was created in 2014 by research staff of the U.S. Forest Service, Mary I Williams and R Kasten Dumroese. Their report to the agency, along with a journal article they published in 2013, served to defuse controversy about assisted migration in the field of forestry.

The most detailed case study of Torreya Guardians published in a science journal was written by a pair of Canadian Forest Service researchers and published in The Forestry Chronicle. Table 2 of that 2011 report lists six "Ecological standards for assisted migration developed for Torreya taxifolia". They conclude, "The momentum that this group has created resulted in the U.S. Fish and Wildlife Service considering whether assisted migration is an appropriate strategy for this species (U.S. Fish and Wildlife Service 2010).... This is a very interesting example of how a grassroots organization can propel assisted migration into the forefront, causing a governmental agency to consider the use of this strategy."

== Reception within the Bioethics profession ==
Bioethics professionals have pointed to the actions undertaken by Torreya Guardians as an example of why assisted migration is inherently controversial when proposed or used as a tool for helping native plants or animals adapt to ongoing climate change.The Routledge Handbook of Philosophy of Biodiversity, published in 2017, includes this mention of Torreya Guardians:

When it comes to ecosystems, presumably the most oft-cited example of assisted migration concerns Torreya Guardians who transplanted seedlings of Florida Torreya (Torreya taxifolia) in North Carolina. The translocation was motivated by the endangered status of Florida Torreya and by their view that the species belongs to the Appalachian Mountains as it is thought to have lived there before (Torreya Guardians 2014). As these examples show, naturalness as belonging leaves room for different kinds of interpretations of the relation of 'belonging'.

A law review article published in 2010 concluded that, "For many, conservation ethics is rooted in a sense of place and is context-specific. Even the Torreya Guardians, who ardently argue for the employment of assisted migration for protecting Torreya taxifolia, formulate their reasoning for moving the endangered plant north at least partially in restorative terms."

The author of a 2020 article published in the journal Ethics and Environment also chose Florida torreya for ethical analysis of assisted migration. In this case, the controversy entails more than the usual questions of whether, when, and how to apply assisted migration. The matter of who gets to make that decision is also central:

Some would argue that it is unclear if this group [Torreya Guardians] should be labeled as "eco-vigilantes" or as "species saviors." However, what is clear is that if governments do not take swift and effective measures to save the ever-growing list of endangered species, groups such as the Torreya Guardians will, in all likelihood, grow exponentially. This possibility is problematic because despite their good intentions, they are amateurs—they run the risk of doing more harm than good. If assisted relocations are to take place, they should be undertaken by well-trained professionals working under the auspices of governmental and academic organizations.

Two interdisciplinary journals in 2024 published papers on the ethical perspectives pertaining to assisted migration that used Torreya Guardians as a case study. One concluded, "Although this assisted migration was criticized for its lack of scientific planning prior to implementation, it has provided noteworthy results in terms of this tree species' post-migration performance." The second paper concluded:

Conservation biologists have taken issue with this approach for ecological reasons, but there are also concerns about consensus among interested parties and the procedural norms of fairness in decision-making. As a policy approach, the Torreya Guardians may not be the ideal model to emulate, since their efforts were not coordinated with other conservation plans and were not guided by a consensus among community members that allowed for deliberation of the potential outcomes, nor was it accompanied by an iterative process of adaptive governance that might have been able to account for contingencies.
