= Assisted migration of forests in North America =

Human-facilitated forest migration process

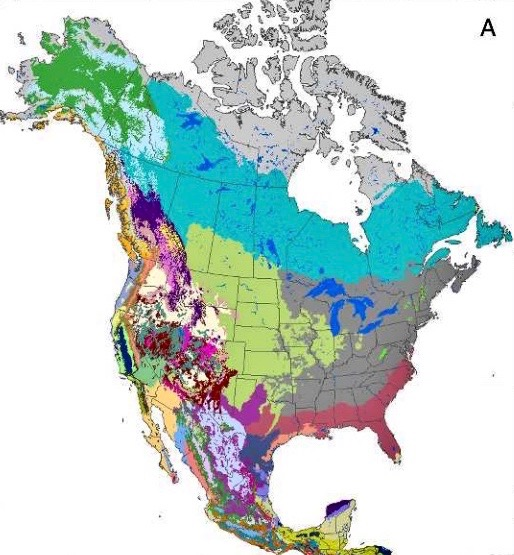
Biomes of North America - CURRENT (Rehfeldt et al. 2012)

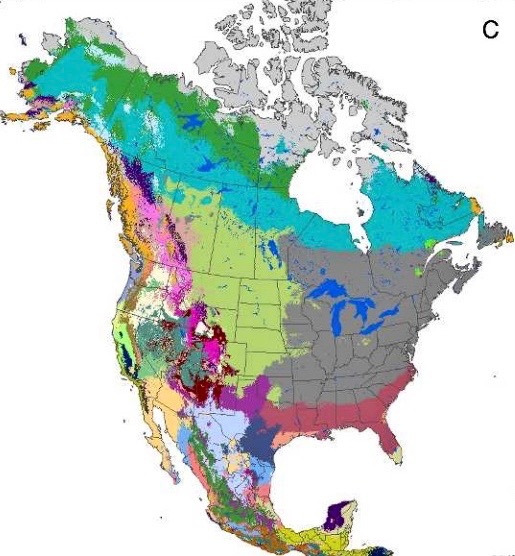
Biomes of North America - PROJECTED 2060 (Rehfeldt et al. 2012)

Assisted migration is the movement of populations or species by humans from one territory to another in response to climate change. This is the definition offered in a nontechnical document published by the United States Forest Service in 2023, suggesting that this form of climate adaptation "could be a proactive, pragmatic tool for building climate resilience in our landscapes."

Programs for assisted migration of forests in North America have been created by public and indigenous governmental bodies, private forest owners, and land trusts. They have been researching, testing, evaluating, and sometimes implementing forest assisted migration projects as a form of adaptation to climate change. Assisted migration in the forestry context differs from assisted migration as originally proposed in the context of conservation biology, where it is regarded as a management tool for helping endangered species cope with the need for climate adaptation. The focus in forestry is mitigating climate change's negative effects on the health and productivity of working forests.

Forestry assisted migration is already underway in North America because of the rapidly changing climate and the forestry industry's reseeding practices. It is now standard practice for governmental and industrial harvests of trees to be followed by the planting of seeds or seedlings in the harvested areas. Hence, an opportunity automatically arises post-harvest to select seeds (and sometimes different species of trees) from areas with climates that are expected to arrive in the harvested sites decades into the future. The government of British Columbia in Canada was the first federated state on the continent to make the decision to change their seed transfer guidelines accordingly in 2009.

Longer distance forms of assisted migration were not, however, considered prior to climate modelling and within-forest evidence of the increasing pace of climate change. Serious discussion and debate ensued in the forestry profession beginning around 2008. The debate focuses around the ethical implications of artificially migrating ecosystems, the risks and benefits of such endeavors, and the values at the heart of assisted forest migration projects.

There are also recorded instances of inadvertent assisted migration of North American trees. Beginning in the early 20th century, two trees famously endemic to California, the giant sequoia and coast redwood, have been planted for urban forestry purposes northward in cities along the Pacific coast of Oregon, Washington, and British Columbia. Today these specimens are not only thriving; they are prominent along urban skylines and often outrank the native trees in sizes achieved. As well, several kinds of Magnolia native to the southeastern United States have dispersed into the forest understory, thanks to ornamental plantings producing seeds beyond their native ranges.

== Climate change as impetus ==
Climate change is increasing the average temperatures of North American forests. By the 2020s the forestry profession in North America no longer debated whether human assistance in helping native trees might be necessary. A 2023 scientific article began, "Global change is reshaping climatic conditions at a tempo that exceeds natural migration rates for most tree species." The implications are that "this mismatch may cause catastrophic losses of key forest ecosystem services such as carbon sequestration, habitat provisioning, and forest products."

Range shifts upslope to higher topographic altitudes require less distance than shifts tracking climate over relatively flat terrain poleward. Species within the southern limits of their range are already showing decline or extirpation, including some of North America's most iconic trees (Joshua Tree and giant sequoia). Drier conditions in the American Southwest are leading to shrubby grassland replacing pinyon-juniper woodland, following drought-induced die-off of trees. Foresters in Minnesota are predicting that prairie ecosystems will expand, replacing forests as their region becomes warmer and drier. Regional climate change in the Sierra mountains of California made it possible for native bark beetles to kill drought-stressed conifer trees, which in turn led to expansive and catastrophic fires. Although the giant sequoia is more resistant to bark beetles than are the pines and firs intermixed in and surrounding its groves, the regional fires consuming the standing dead conifers in 2020 and 2021 proved fatal to giant sequoias whose living canopies were also engulfed.

The northern populations of temperate tree species ranges in coastal Washington and Oregon began to evidence abrupt decline and mortality over such large regions that news articles written for the public, as well as academic papers, reported on this phenomenon in 2021 and 2022. Bigleaf maple, Western redcedar, Douglas fir, and several species of true firs (genus Abies) were featured in reports of sudden decline. While proximate causes included evidence of native insects and fungal pathogens, the reports attributed ultimate cause to the unprecedented summer droughts and heat waves in the region. In 2023, the tree species dominating the lower western slopes of California's Sierra Nevada mountains were reported to be so lagging in tracking warming climate upslope that one-fifth of the total area was labelled as "zombie forests" — that is, forests that can no longer establish new seedlings and thus will not revive after a canopy-destroying fire.

A synthesis paper published in 2022 by a team of governmental and university forestry scientists in the United States warned that "climate change may represent the greatest challenge ever faced by forest managers, conservation biologists, and ecologists." Catastrophic tree mortality was among the challenges listed by the team as not only projected but already underway.

== Definitions ==
A 2011 discussion paper in the British Columbia Journal of Ecosystems and Management offered this definition of assisted migration: "the purposeful movement of species to facilitate or mimic natural population or range expansion to help ensure forest plantations remain resilient in future climates." A 2016 review article defines forestry assisted migration as "the physical realignment of natural populations to the climate for which they are adapted, by reforestation in sites where their suitable climate is predicted to occur in the future, as an active management option with the aim of maintaining healthy tree ecosystems in the future." The article says that human assistance in helping trees migrate is necessary because "geographic shifts of tree populations will have to be 10 to 100 times faster than they have been in the past or are at present."

=== Three types ===
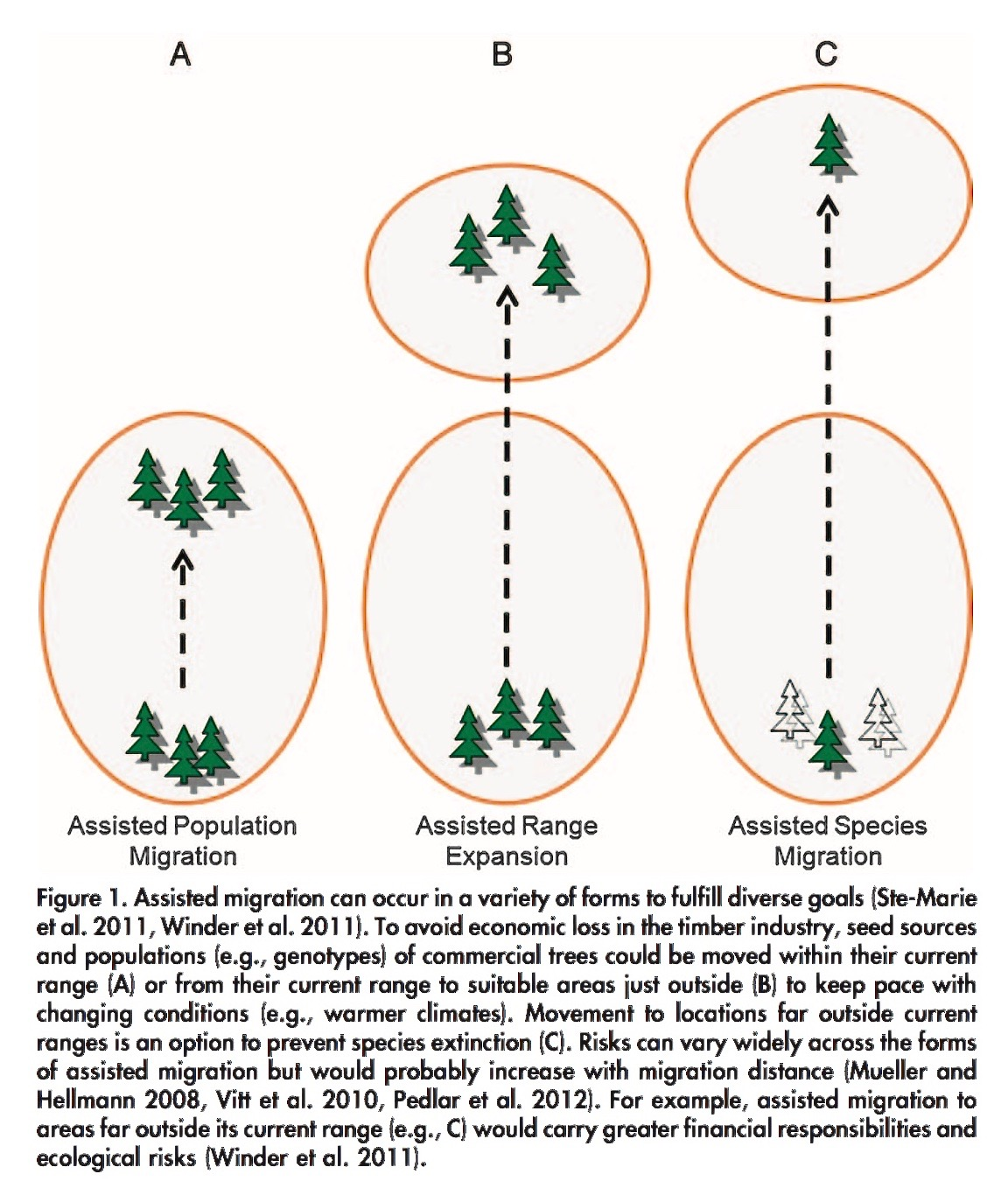
Three types of forestry assisted migration

There are three types of forestry assisted migration, which Natural Resources Canada describes in this way:

1. Assisted population migration: the human-assisted movement of populations within a species' established range.
2. Assisted range expansion: the human-assisted movement of species to areas just outside their established range, facilitating or mimicking natural range expansion.
3. Assisted long-distance migration: the human-assisted movement of species to areas far outside their established range (beyond areas accessible through natural dispersal).

The United States Forest Service uses the same three types, but sometimes refers to the third type as assisted species migration. In 2018 the U.S. Forest Service published a longer policy document, which listed and defined the three types this way:

1. Assisted population migration (also assisted genetic migration or assisted gene flow) – moving seed sources or populations to new locations within the historical species range.
2. Assisted range expansion – moving seed sources or populations from their current range to suitable areas just beyond the historical species range, facilitating or mimicking natural dispersal.
3. Assisted species migration (also species rescue, managed relocation, or assisted long-distance migration) – moving seed sources or populations to a location far outside the historical species range, beyond locations accessible by natural dispersal.

Terminology to distinguish forestry applications of assisted migration from the more controversial practices being debated within conservation biology were suggested in a lengthy 2012 report on climate adaptation within the U.S. Forest Service. The authors proposed "forestry assisted migration" for their agency's endeavors and "rescue assisted migration" for the species-specific extinction concerns of conservation biologists. That same year nine forestry scientists (all but one of whom is Canadian) coauthored a paper that likewise recommended "forest assisted migration" as preferred terminology for helping their profession stay clear of the controversy that they referred to as "species rescue assisted migration". As of 2021, the original classification names of the three types is in public as well as professional use, with foresters focusing on the two most moderate forms.

== Early scholarship and debate ==
Beginning in 2004 and accelerating in 2007, researchers in conservation biology published papers on the pros and cons of supplementing traditional management practices for preventing plant and animal extinctions with species translocation tactics to accommodate the range shifts already becoming evident as a result of climate change. Conservation biologists also published arguments for and against the three main terms used to name the same management tool: assisted migration, assisted colonization, and managed relocation.

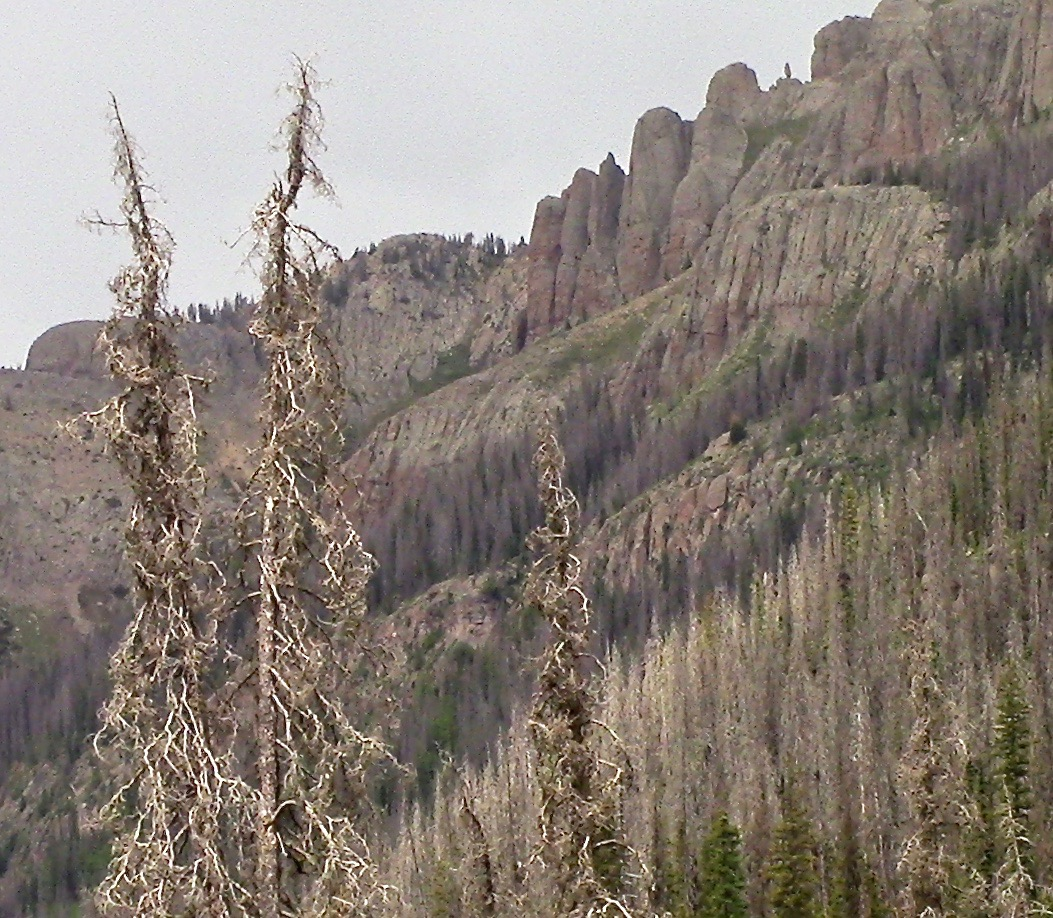
Native bark beetles are now able to kill even the highest elevation trees (Engelmann spruce) in the national forests of Colorado. Photo June 2014, Wolf Creek Pass.

The focus among forestry professionals and researchers was different. Paleoecologists had already concluded that there were significant lags in northward movement of even the dominant canopy trees in North America during the thousands of years since the final glacial retreat. In the 1990s, forestry researchers had begun applying climate change projections to their own tree species distribution models, and some results on the probable distances of future range shifts prompted attention. As well, translocation terminology was not controversial among forestry researchers because "migration" was the standard term used in paleoecology for natural movements of tree species recorded in the geological record. Discussion in forestry journals therefore pertained more to questions of how and when and for which species climate-adaptive plantings and range expansions should begin.

Debate as to the need for and ethics of assisted migration was present among forestry researchers. But compared to the debate among conservation biologists, it was muted and short-lived. One of the strongest statements urging caution that appeared in a forestry journal was published in 2011. Isabelle Aubin and colleagues stated that "assisted migration is being proposed to reduce the impacts of human-induced climate change, an unprecedented situation in human history that brings with it entirely new environmental, societal and ethical challenges."

But also in 2011, researchers within the Canadian Forest Service expressly distinguished forestry assisted migration from the concept debated in conservation biology. Preventing species extinctions was not a forestry focus. Rather, forestry forms of assisted migration would be undertaken for the purposes of maintaining the forests' ecosystem services as well as the extractive resource values of timber and pulp production. The Canadian Forest Service also produced research showing forest health and productivity could benefit from relocating forest understory plant species along with the dominant canopy tree species and that this would help with the successful establishment of a forest at a new location.

== Strategies ==
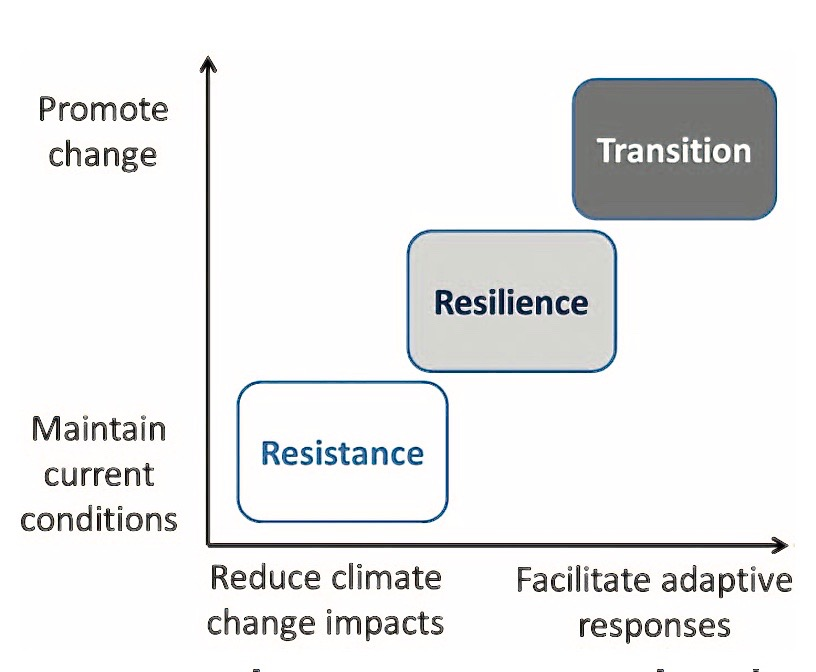
"Transition" results from assisted migration of more southerly tree species

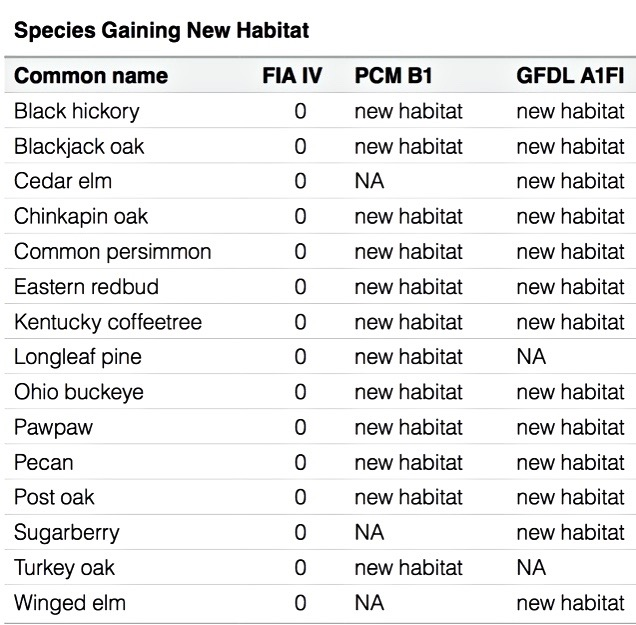
A list of 15 tree species native to more southerly regions of the US, but which were already (or would soon become during climate change) adapted for living in the Chicago area

In focusing on common canopy trees, forestry forms of assisted migration generated less intense debate than did the largely animal focus of conservation biologists. Animals have the ability to move at will and thus pose risks of quickly shifting beyond or entirely out of the locales into which they are translocated. Animal mobility also complicates monitoring results, and may require the added costs of radio collars and skilled trackers. Costs of translocating mammals, in particular, may escalate owing to standards of minimizing psychological and physical suffering during capture, transport, and release.

In contrast, assisted migration of forests can be done at little cost, especially when it is paired with an existing reforestation program. Risks are also reduced in forestry because the only motility that trees have occurs when their seeds are released. Tall woody plants tend to have long generation times, so several decades may pass before translocated seeds or seedlings can produce a next generation of seeds. Even then, seed dispersal distances may be limited, except for tufted seeds carried by wind and small fruits, such as berries, swallowed whole by birds and wide-ranging mammals.

Communication strategies have also defused the controversy. Forest researchers and managers have talked and written about climate adaptation projects without using terminology coined by conservation biologists, whose focus is generally the wellbeing of single species of animals and plants that might be harmed or lost as climate change continues.

By 2014 forestry managers in Canada had also honed their public communications in a number of ways, such as avoiding to be associated with the scientific debate on assisted migration and instead presenting their assisted migration as forest management best practices.

Communication in both word and images has also been honed in the United States, thanks in part to the Northern Institute of Applied Climate Science (NIACS), a collaborative group launched in 2010 by the U.S. Forest Service. The NIACS proposed various ways though which foresters can adapt to climate change by changing their forest management techniques. In 2026 the "Adaptive Silviculture for Climate Change" program published a paper documenting ten years of efforts and results, of which assisted migration is a major component.

A 2022 review paper that charted key words and lead authors in forestry publications concluded that "much of the research on assisted migration has been carried out in North America, where Canada and the USA have established strong collaborative networks." At the individual level, a Mexican forestry scientist was found to be "the most productive author in the field of assisted migration."

== Indigenous people's perspectives and actions ==
Starting in 1492, the arrival of colonizers pushed Indigenous peoples of the Americas out of their native lands and severely constricted where they could continue to live. While climate adaptation may be a necessary consideration today, assisted migration is not a readily palatable option for Indigenous peoples, given the grounding in mutual relations with the ecosystems in which their cultures are enmeshed.

The term "assisted colonization", used in the guidelines of the International Union for Conservation of Nature (IUCN) to describe moving a species outside its native range to prevent it from going extinct, has been criticized as potentially offensive to Indigenous peoples because the word "colonization" is linked to their experience of genocide. According to Connie Barlow, the term 'managed relocation' may also be offensive in the United States, owing to the harm caused by the Indian Relocation Act of 1956. Some scholars have pointed out that this terminology could prevent these nations from consenting to and participating in forestry assisted migration projects.

Indigenous botanist Robin Wall Kimmerer has used the term "helping forests walk" in lieu of any of the terms currently used by foresters, conservation biologists, and other researchers and scholars. Kimmerer is founder and director of the Center for Native Peoples and the Environment, hosted by SUNY College of Environmental Science and Forestry, which lists "Helping Forests Walk" as a five-year collaborative project launched in 2011 and completed in 2016. This project is also listed on the "tribal nations" page of the U.S. government "Climate Resilience Toolkit" website.

In 2024 a collaborative report presented Indigenous knowledge and forest management experience as meriting equal standing alongside the prevailing paradigm and assumptions inherent in forestry grounded in western science. Authors and contributors included university academics, research scientists in both the USA and Canadian forestry services, and tribal forestry professionals. Indigenous values described as a "culture of reciprocity" with other living beings and entailing responsibility for future generations grounded the recommendations in this report. Assisted migration is mentioned only once in this lengthy report: "Active planting of tree species in areas that will be more climate-suitable for them in the future (i.e., assisted migration) may help to reforest landscapes where longer term stability is a goal."

The Northern Institute of Applied Climate Science facilitated collaboration on a tribal climate adaptation menu for the Great Lakes region. The document that resulted was published in 2019 as Dibaginjigaadeg Anishinaabe Ezhitwaad: A Tribal Climate Adaptation Menu. The only standard term used was "assisted migration" (and this was used only once). The term "invasive species" was replaced either by a new term, "non-local beings", or by an Ojibwe phrase, "Bakaan ingoji ga-ondaadag", which is defined as "that which comes from somewhere else and now resides here." The document summarized the importance of word choice in this way:

As the original and current stewards of the Great Lakes region, Ojibwe and Menominee tribal members who worked on this project felt it important to bring a language of parity between human and non-human beings. English and scientific terminology used in currently accepted land management practices tends to assume human dominance over non-human beings. This approach deviates from an equitable co-existence with our environment, which is typically a foundational understanding in many indigenous cultures. The terms used throughout this document are an attempt to recognize agency and sovereignty of our non-human relations.

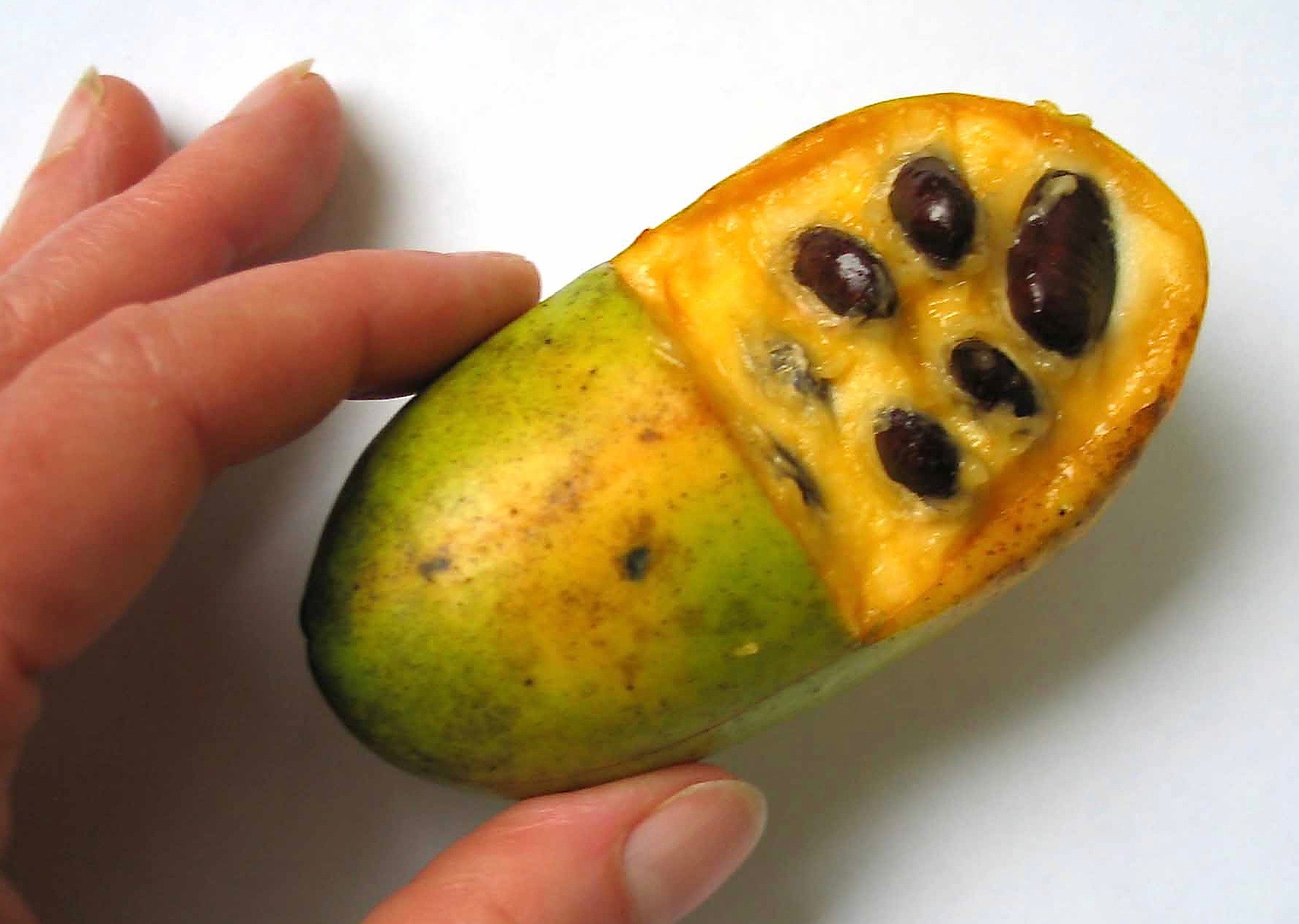
Native Americans may have helped pawpaw (Asimina triloba) disperse by carrying its fruit northward as glaciers retreated in eastern North America.

As of 2021, the Little Traverse Bay Bands of Odawa Indians in northern Michigan have planted tree species common to more southerly ranges, including shagbark hickory, silver maple, black walnut, swamp white oak, sassafras, and pawpaw. Noah Jansen, conservationist staff, explains, "I don't know which of these species are going to thrive in 50 or 100 years. So we cast the net broad and try to have something there that creates habitat for wildlife, sources of cultural significance for tribal members and areas to hunt and gather."

Because California is already experiencing adverse climate change effects on native vegetation, the need for adaptive responses is severe. Traditional use of fire in managing local ecosystems for safety and for ensuring abundance of culturally significant plant and animal foods has drawn media attention to the climate-adaptive actions by the Karuk Tribe along the Klamath River of northern California.

== Implementation ==
=== Changes in seed transfer guidelines ===
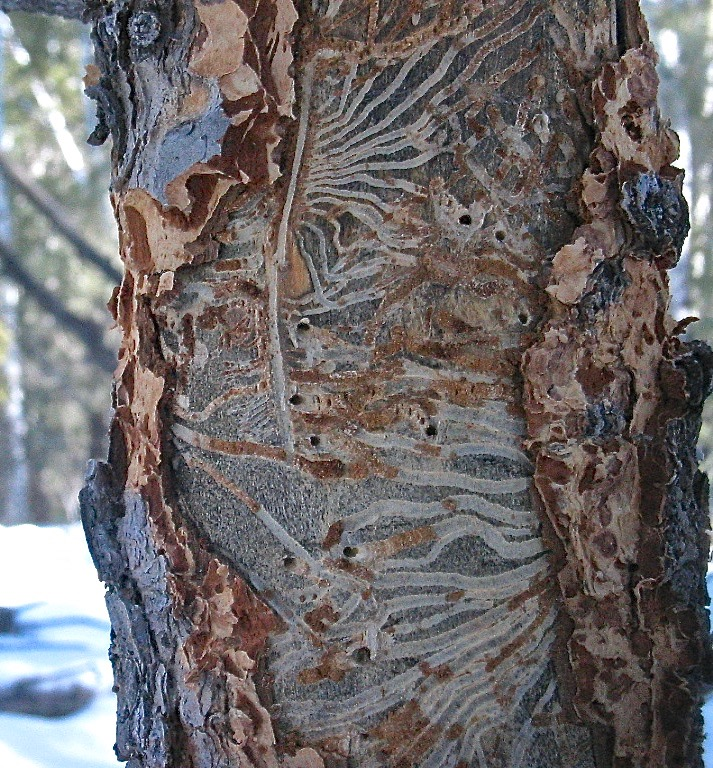
Tunnels created by the larvae of native bark beetles are evident beneath the bark of this dead Douglas-fir trunk in Colorado.

Forestry research has long been conducted by governmental agencies responsible for management of federal and provincial forests in Canada (Crown lands) and federal and state forests in the United States. Because timber and pulp resources are harvested from multiple use regions of public forests in North America, re-seeding or planting seedlings onto harvested sites has been a routine management practice for many decades. Research for improving silviculture practices has included tree provenance trials, by which a variety of seed sources (or provenances) are planted together at several distinct geographic test sites ("common gardens") across the current and, increasingly, potential range of a species. Because provenance trial data are available for many widespread, commercially valuable tree species, forestry professionals already have long-term experiments underway for testing tree species and population viability and performance in locations outside of native geographic ranges. Provenance trial locations poleward of native ranges or at higher (and thus cooler) elevations help forest managers determine whether, where, and when assisted migration as a climate adaptation measure should be implemented.

In 2009, British Columbia altered its standards for selecting seeds for replanting forests after a timber harvest. Previously, foresters were required to use seeds from within 300 meters downhill and 200 meters uphill, but the new policy allowed foresters to obtain seeds from up to 500 meters downhill for most species, taking advantage of the fact that populations in warmer habitats downhill may be better adapted to the future climate of the restoration site. As of 2022, research, including study of provenance trials already in place, is ongoing in British Columbia and the Canadian provinces of Alberta and Ontario. These changes were implemented partly because Canadian policymakers feared that, if they did not set the guidelines, the private sector would be tempted to pursue an unregulated assisted migration strategy on its own. In 2022, the climate-adapted seed transfer guidelines for British Columbia transitioned from being optional for provincial reforestation projects to mandatory.

Within the United States Forest Service, regional geneticists have recommended a "no regrets" approach to considering assisted migration and seed transfer as a climate adaptation strategy. Population transfers to match seed sources to projected future conditions are recommended only for species where experience or research has demonstrated appropriate climate transfer limits. Forest Service researchers have also used computer modeling to offer projections of native tree species range shifts under a variety of climate change projections. A total of 76 species of trees native to the western US have range-shift projection maps available online. A total of 134 species of trees native to the eastern US have range shift projection maps available online. Forest Service researchers have also been publishing regional range shift projections for North American tree species since the 1990s.

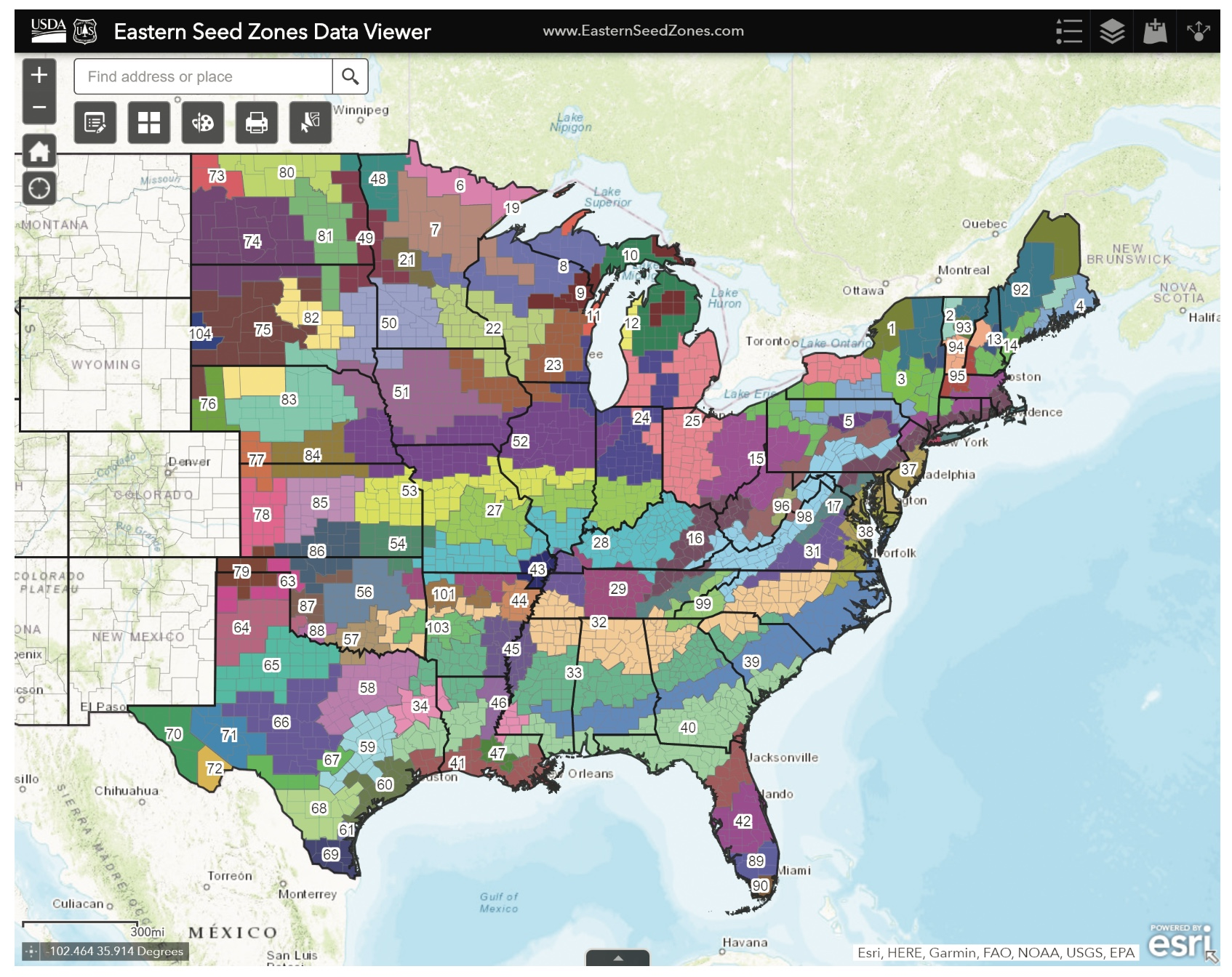
Eastern Seed Zone Map, by U.S. Department of Agriculture.

Several decision support tools are available for assisted migration in North American forests. The Seedlot Selection Tool currently has the broadest geographic scope of these tools, covering most of North America, and requires the user to set the acceptable climate transfer distances from a suite of climate variables. The Climate-Based Seed Transfer tool provides coverage across British Columbia, and uses data from common garden experiments to determine acceptable seed sources, based on anticipated growth and climate-transfer distance. The Climate-Adapted Seed Tool provides coverage in California, Oregon, Washington, Nevada, and Idaho (with some features currently only available in California) and uses data from common garden experiments and forest inventories to produce estimates of how well different seed sources will perform (growth, survival, carbon sequestration, timber production) at user-specified planting locations.

In the eastern United States, forestry professionals in federal, state, and academic institutions have collaborated in establishing a mutually agreed upon map of 247 "seed-collection zones" spanning the 37 states east of the Rocky Mountains. (See image at right.) This project also entails standardized norms for labelling seeds by collectors and nurseries in anticipation that future reforestation and restoration plantings may begin to include various forms of forestry assisted migration.

In 2024, a forestry paper was published in which a "climate analog approach" was offered for seed transfer and assisted migration decision-making. Instead of needing to first choose among a range of projection maps (usually at 30-year intervals) based on a variety of IPCC-approved computer models, forest managers would be offered a single map that aggregates three such models, utilizes 19 climate variables, and restricts its focus to mid-century projections. As well, instead of outputs showing range projections for one species at a time, the tool would pinpoint "sites with contemporary climate similar to the future climate at a target location."

=== Western larch ===
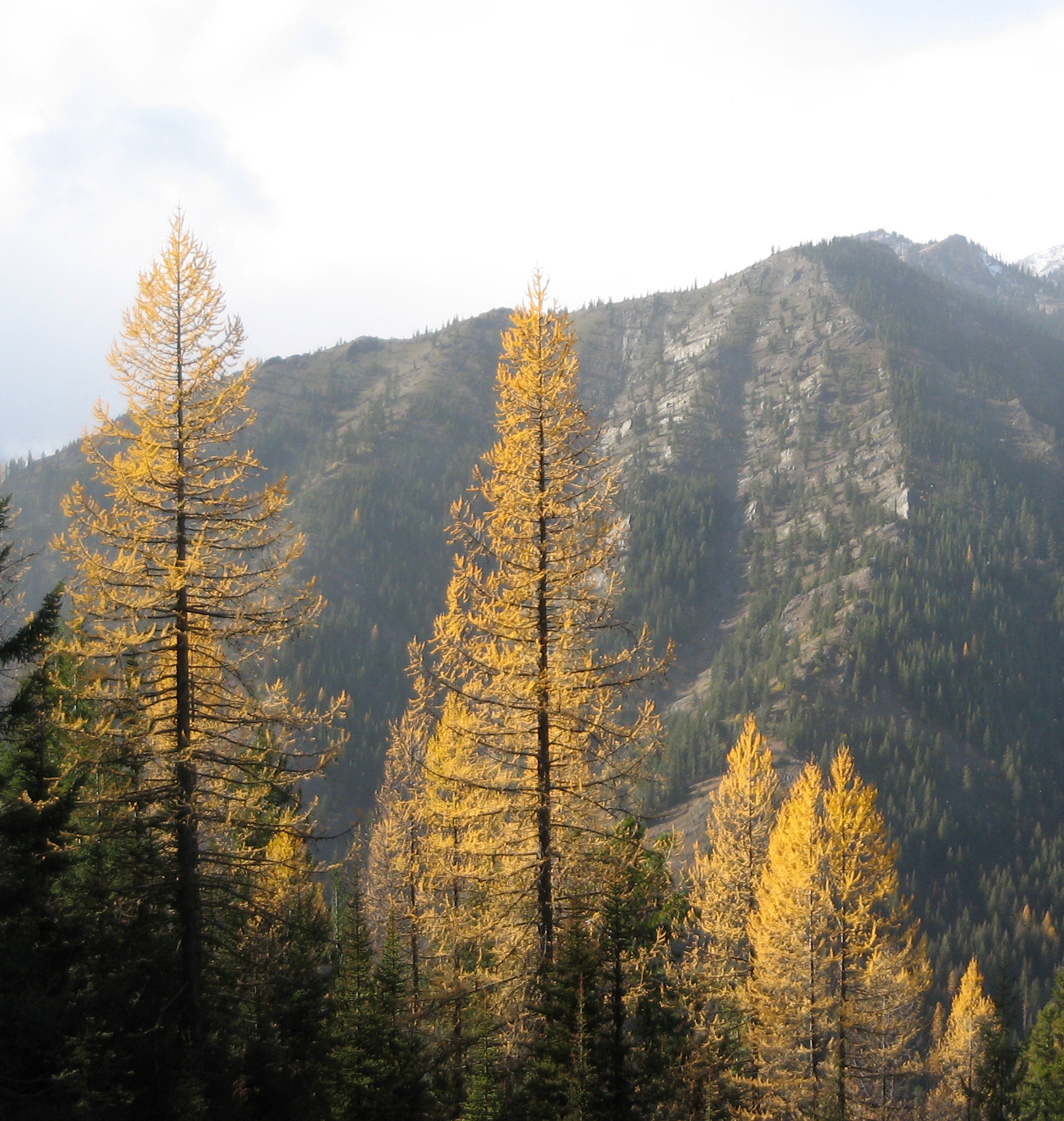
Western larch in autumn

In 2010, the Government of British Columbia implemented an assisted range expansion project for one particular canopy species: the western larch. Larch could now be selected for provincial reforestation projects nearly 1,000 kilometers northward of its current range. Research had shown that the western larch, the most productive of the three species of larch native to North America, has no trouble growing in northern British Columbia, where climatic conditions are predicted to match the western larch's historical range by 2030. This was the first government-approved assisted long-distance migration program for a North American canopy tree. The western larch was selected for assisted species migration because of its significant commercial importance and the fear that climate change and parasites such as the mountain pine beetle would considerably diminish its supply.

Foresters in the United States have also initiated "experimental treatments" of larch-dominated national forests in Montana. However, if some "aggressively warming climate scenarios" unfold, foresters will need to let go of any expectations of helping this species maintain a presence south of the Canadian border.

=== Whitebark pine ===
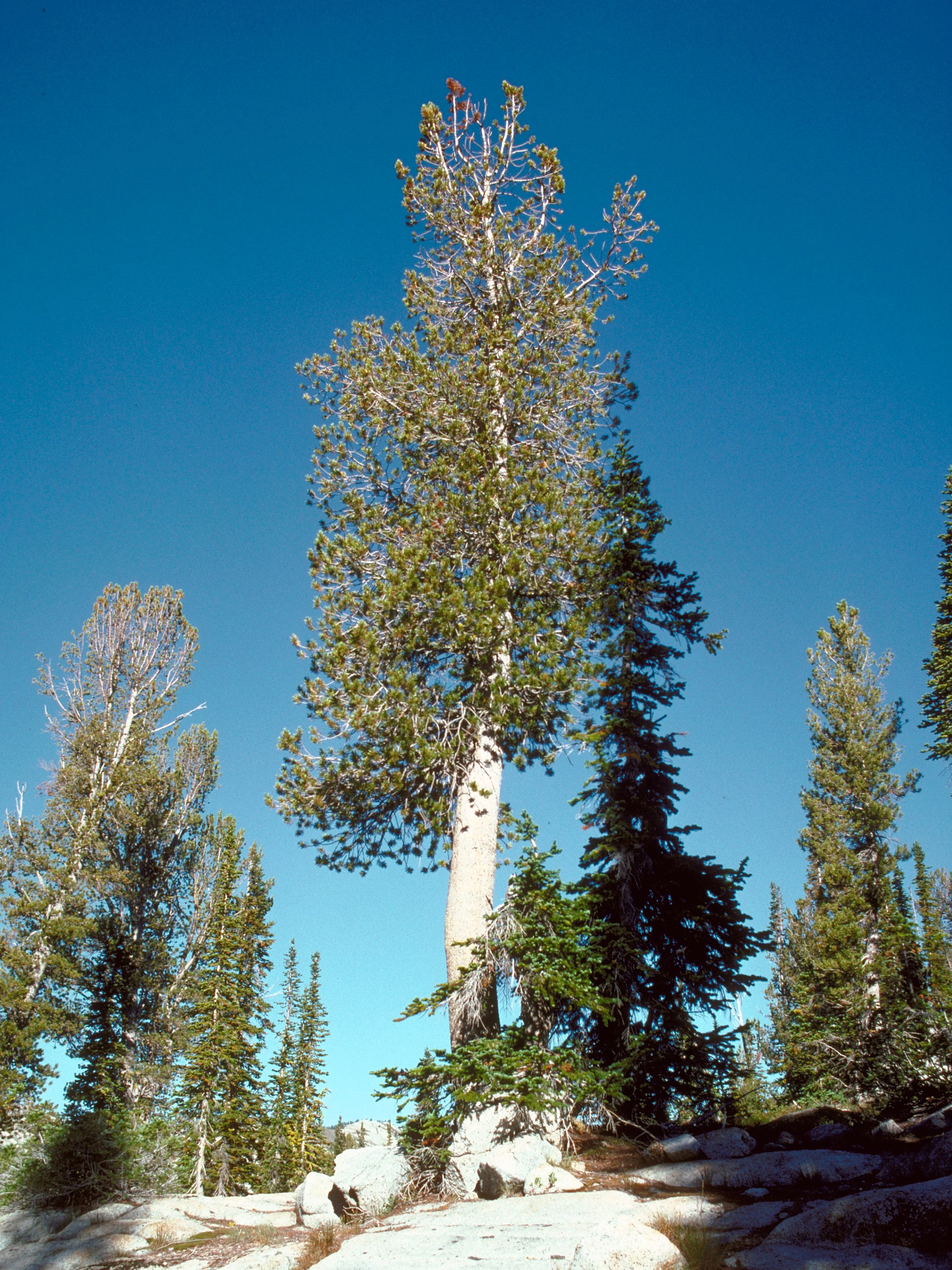
An old whitebark pine in Oregon

University of British Columbia forestry researchers Sierra McLane and Sally Aitken were among the first scientists to engage in long-distance experimental plantings to test how far northward seeds of a tree native to North America could germinate and continue to grow, in advance of expected warming in North America. They selected whitebark pine for their case study, as it is a keystone species that is already a threatened species in western North America. The authors used species distribution modelling to learn that this species will likely be extirpated from most of its current range as temperatures rise over the next half century. The same models indicate that a large area within northwestern British Columbia is already climatically suitable for the species under current conditions and will remain so throughout the 21st century.

Experimental plantings in eight sites began in 2007. Ten years later results were tallied. Protective snow cover throughout the winter, followed by spring melt ending in April or May, proved to be a far better indicator of seedling survival and growth than latitude. Indeed, the tallest seedlings measured in 2017 were those at the northern-most experimental site—600 kilometers beyond the species' current distribution. The authors explained that "post-glacial migration has been too slow" for this large-seeded pine to track warming, even during the thousands of years that preceded the pace and scale of human-caused climate change. These experimental plantings for learning the poleward limits of tolerance, reproduction, and thrival of whitebark pine are first steps toward implementation.

In 2012 the Canadian federal government declared Whitebark pine endangered in accordance with the Species at Risk Act. Accordingly, it became the first federally listed endangered tree in western Canada.

In 2022 the U.S. Fish & Wildlife Service also acted. Based on a 2021 "Species Status Assessment Report, it listed Whitebark pine in the lowest category of vulnerability: "threatened." Four distinct threats were described, beginning with white pine blister rust as "the primary stressor." Mountain pine beetle, altered fire regimes, and "the effects of climate change" add to the challenges. This listing marks the first occasion in which a tree regarded as ecologically important over a vast range in the United States is acknowledged as vulnerable to extinction. Even before the official listing, collaboration among stakeholders was underway. Supportive research and actions were undertaken by the conservation organization American Forests as well as a new organization specific to the tree: the Whitebark Pine Ecosystem Foundation. Other collaborators include research scientists within the U.S. Forest Service, geneticists at the University of California, Davis, and the Confederated Salish and Kootenai Tribes. The U.S. Bureau of Land Management and the National Park Service were also involved in consultation prior to listing by the agency in charge of endangered species: the U.S. Fish and Wildlife Service.

=== Mexico's oyamel fir ===
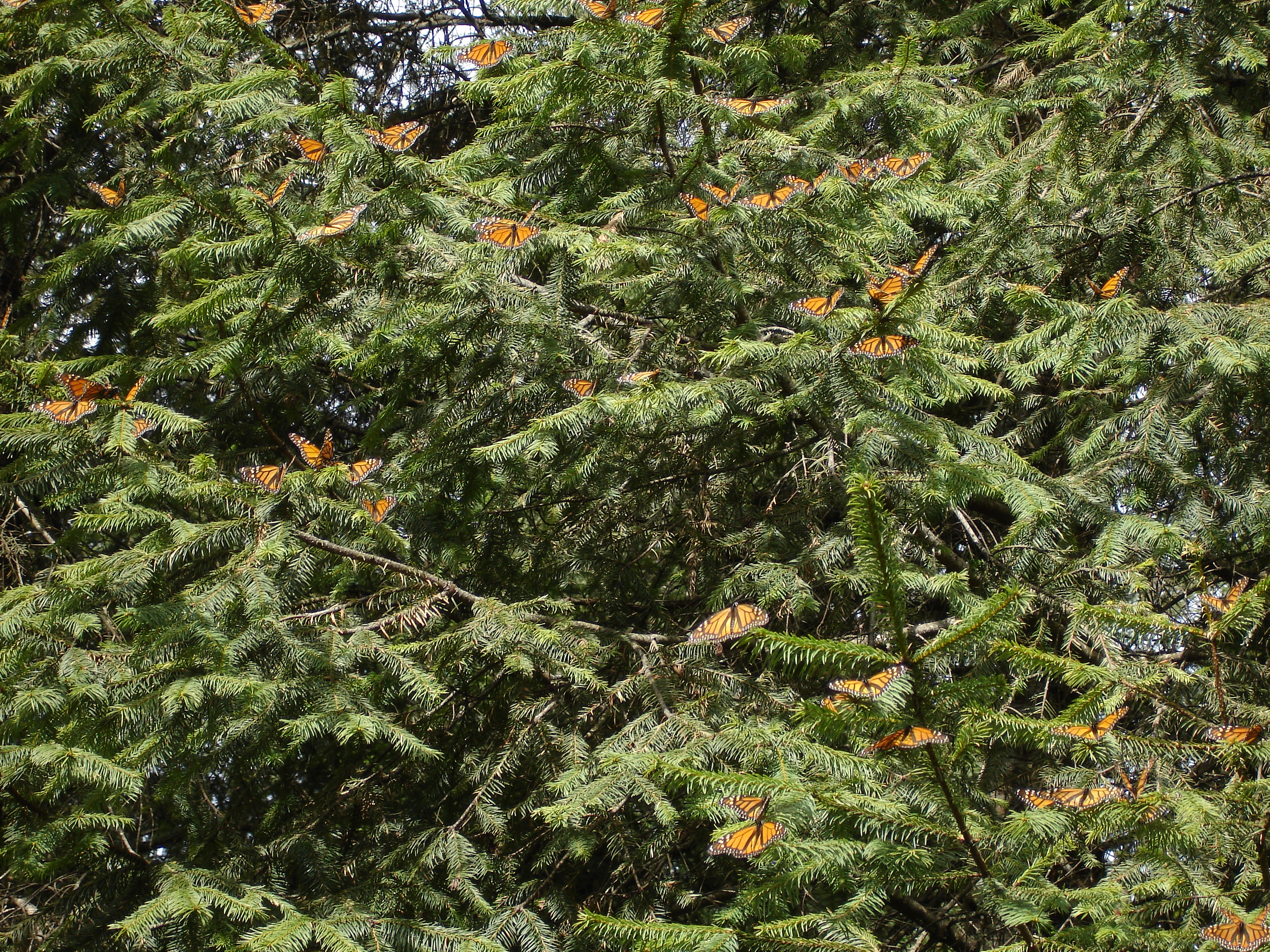
Oyamel fir foliage with monarch butterflies Danaus plexippus

The Monarch Butterfly Biosphere Reserve in central Mexico depends upon the integrity of its evergreen forest trees to serve as winter habitat for a long-distance annual migrator: the monarch butterfly. The oyamel fir is a major species of evergreen on which the overwintering butterflies spend a significant time during their winter diapause, or suspended development. The tree's survival is threatened at its lower elevations on mountain slopes, in part, by climate change. Climate stress is also indicated by weak seedling recruitment, meaning that most of the oyamel fir seedlings do not survive past that point. This is true even in the higher forest elevations where trees do not otherwise show strong indicators of stress. Upslope assisted migration experiments are underway, with findings suggesting that "400 meters upward in elevation (i.e., assisted migration) to compensate for future warmer climates does not appear to have any negative impacts on the seedlings, while potentially conferring closer alignment to future climates."

Assisted migration of oyamel fir is complicated by the necessity of planting this shade-tolerant species under nurse plants—especially because of the extreme solar radiation and the large differences between day and night temperatures at high elevations. Thus, where upslope locales are devoid of forest shade, nurse plants (e.g. Baccharis conferta) must be established first.

=== Recent developments (2019-present) ===
Collaborative organizations of USA and Canadian agencies and forestry interest groups have begun experimenting with one or more of the three types of assisted migration. Among them is the Adaptive Silviculture for Climate Change (ASCC) project and the Experimental Network for Assisted Migration and Establishment Silviculture (ENAMES).

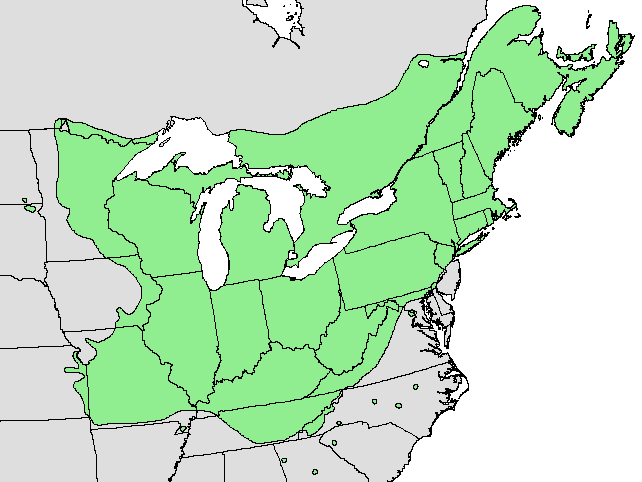
Acer saccharum range map

By 2021 the projects for climate adaptation in forestry had expanded to include planting "novel species" from southward latitudes of the same continent. An early example was the updated management plan for the Petawawa Research Forest northwest of Ottawa in the province of Ontario, Canada. In addition to planting seeds from more southerly populations of the existing species in the forest, the management guidelines also authorized experiments in planting tree species whose northernmost ranges were far to the south, notably several species of hickory, Virginia pine, and American chestnut. A 2023 article reports early success of an ongoing experiment of "assisted range expansion" in another eastern province of Canada. In Quebec forestry scientists have experimentally planted sugar maple, Acer saccharum, northward of its current range. Losses of this species are expected in Canada due to competitive challenges from more southerly tree species moving north.

In 2019 a small land trust in northern Michigan, the Leelanau Conservancy, began advising land owners to plant "trees whose native ranges end just south of here, yet are projected to do well in our region." By 2023 two other land conservancies in Michigan were reported as also planting more southerly tree species including sycamore, pawpaw, blackgum, tuliptree, Kentucky coffeetree, honey locust, and red mulberry.

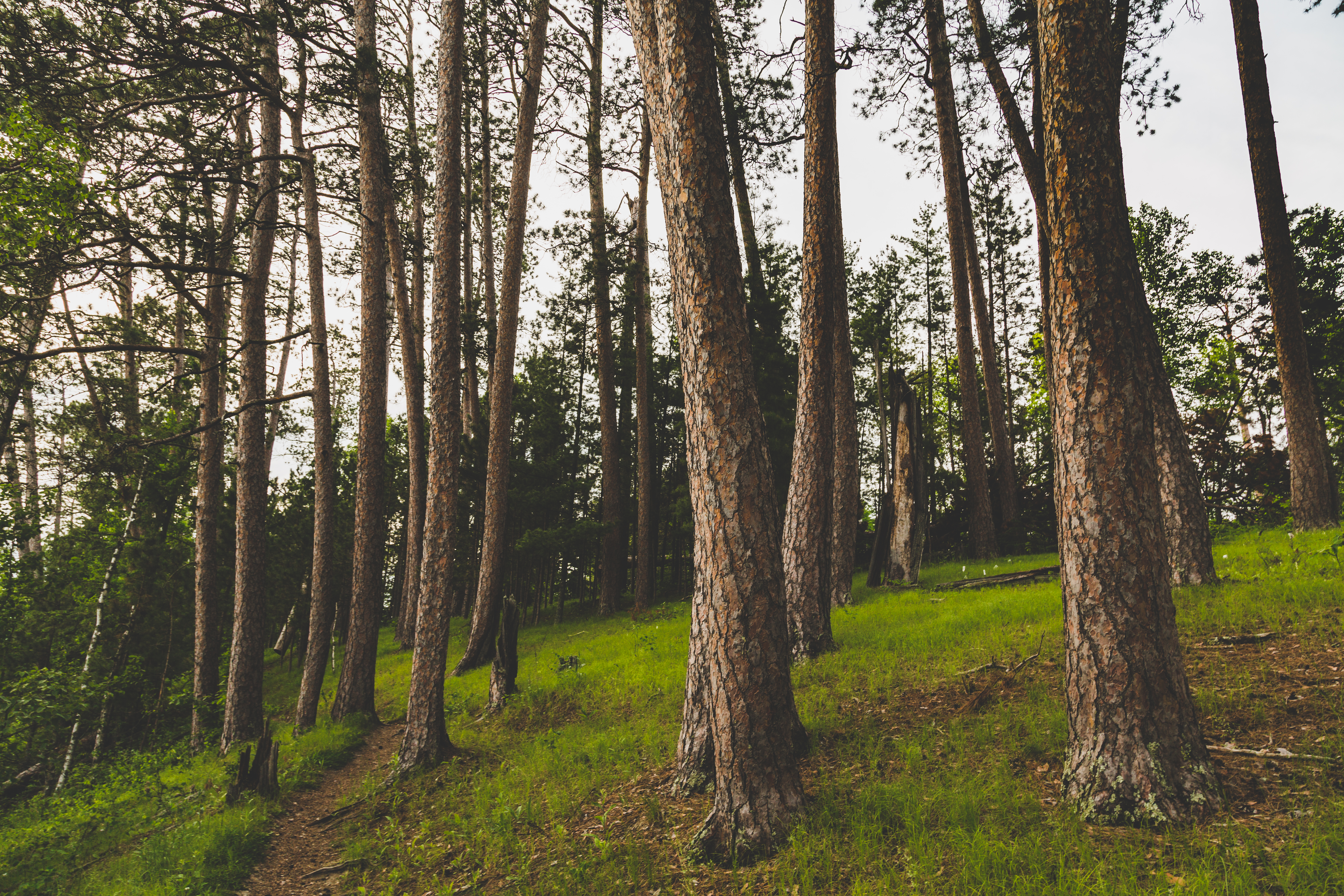
A grove of Pinus resinosa (red pine) at Itasca State Park, Minnesota

In Minnesota, The Nature Conservancy has partnered with the state forestry agency and U.S Forest Service scientists to discern climate adaptation options where dieback of boreal forest trees is already evident in its northwoods. An article published in 2022 by the Minnesota Department of Natural Resources reports on the implementation of assisted population migration and assisted range expansion projects, using trees native to the southern regions of the state. The Superior National Forest, at Minnesota's border with Canada, was reported in 2023 as being in the planning stage for possible "human-assisted tree migration" of more southerly tree species. A final report was issued in 2023, titled "Superior National Forest Assisted Migration Plan." This was the first national forest in the USA to issue a climate adaptation plan that would "operationalize" assisted migration. Approval was, however, given for only two of the three kinds of assisted migration: assisted population migration and assisted range expansion. The report thus refrained from blanket authorization of moving any tree species northward that did not already occur within the Superior National Forest. Because climate projections for Minnesota entail drier as well as warmer conditions, experimentation is underway for possible introduction of a tree widespread in the American west—but several hundred miles distant from the northwoods of Minnesota. Ponderosa pine (Pinus ponderosa) from the Black Hills of South Dakota is being tested as a possible replacement for the dieback ongoing of Minnesota's official state tree: red pine (Pinus resinosa). Brian Palik, a forestry researcher involved in the project, reports favorable early results. Ponderosa pine, he says, "grows better than anything else that we planted." In 2023 researchers reported that even more southerly tree species "are doing well" in test plantings. These include northern pecan and American sycamore. A 2024 review paper noted that ascertaining current range was complicated because "an area may be biotically suitable under current climate, but the species of interest is not present due to competition, dispersal limitations, or past management."

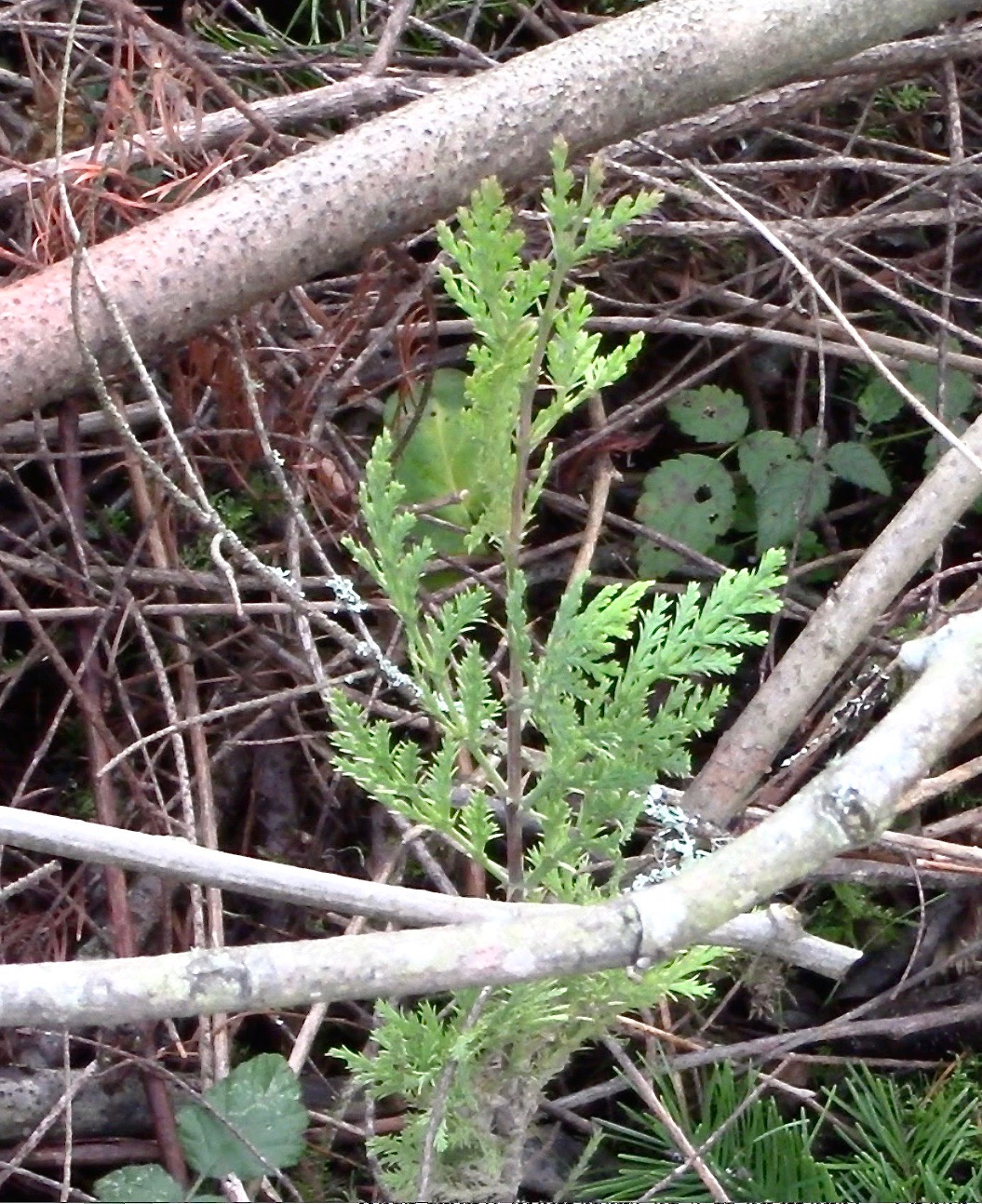
This incense cedar, whose native range is in Oregon and northern California, was one of the more southerly conifer seedlings planted after a logging operation on private land on Whidbey Island in Washington state 2019.

In early spring 2020 a multi-group effort began restoring 154 acres of a 2012 clearcut of Douglas-fir forest at a low elevation site east of Seattle, Washington. The Stossel Creek project is primarily a watershed restoration effort using native tree species, but it is also experimenting with long-distance assisted population migration of the dominant canopy tree, Douglas-fir. Seedlings of Douglas-fir were sourced from nurseries several hundred miles to the south, in Oregon and even northern California. Because nursery stock had run short of native western red-cedar, project leaders chose to substitute a closely related conifer sourced from Oregon and northern California: incense cedar. This species is more drought-tolerant than western red-cedar, but all wild populations occur southward of Washington state. Including incense cedar in the planting list thus brings an element of assisted species migration into this forest restoration project. First-year survival was strong for southerly sourced seedlings of both Douglas-fir and incense cedar.

While extreme summer drought and heat in the mountain states and provinces of western North America have induced massive outbreaks of native bark beetles and fire-caused losses of forest canopies, tree deaths in the eastern half of North America derive from a different mix of causes. Notably, deaths of trees have accelerated due to massive outbreaks of non-native insects. All four widespread canopy species of ash (genus Fraxinus) in the eastern states and provinces have been decimated in recent decades by an Asian beetle, the emerald ash borer. As of 2023, assisted migration tree experiments were underway in the Great Lakes region, expressly seeking one or more replacements for the wetland-adapted black ash. In 2022 and 2023, state agencies and tribes in northern Minnesota and Wisconsin began replacing black ash trees recently killed by the emerald ash borer with more than a dozen species of wet-adapted trees, some of which reach their northern range limits a hundred or more miles to the south. This attempt to ensure that a forest canopy will once again prevail in regional wetlands thus also entails an assisted range expansion form of climate adaptation for species including eastern cottonwood, American hackberry, and river birch.

The boldest assisted migration effort of a forest canopy tree had been initiated by citizens in the Seattle area in 2016. By 2023, their actions had become so substantial that a lengthy journalistic essay was published in a national venue. It was titled, "Can We Save the Redwoods by Helping Them Move?" Two months later, a lengthy news article presented the views of a half-dozen professional forestry practitioners in Oregon and Washington state. Their statements made clear that citizens using "assisted species migration" in their choices of tree plantings (such as the redwoods) were more extreme than the professionals focusing on "assisted population migration" were willing to implement themselves.

In 2024 a Mexican leader who has long advocated for assisted migration to become a standard climate adaptation tool within North American forestry practices published a short paper concluding that the then-current El Niño had already pushed global temperatures to the 1.5 °C threshold of increase that generates self-reinforcing tipping points. His conclusion: "Thus, the time has arrived to discuss painful forest management decisions, such as anticipated thinning to reduce water competition and the gradual replacement of native local forest populations with more drought-resistant provenances and species."

Also in 2024, staff in U.S. Forest Service research stations of the three Pacific coastal states initiated the Experimental Network for Assisted Migration and Establishment Silviculture (ENAMES)."Our goal for this project is to evaluate the selection of seed sources and post-disturbance stand establishment practices to provide guidance on what tree seed sources to use and how to plant them to maintain functional forest ecosystems in the future."

== Inadvertent migration ==
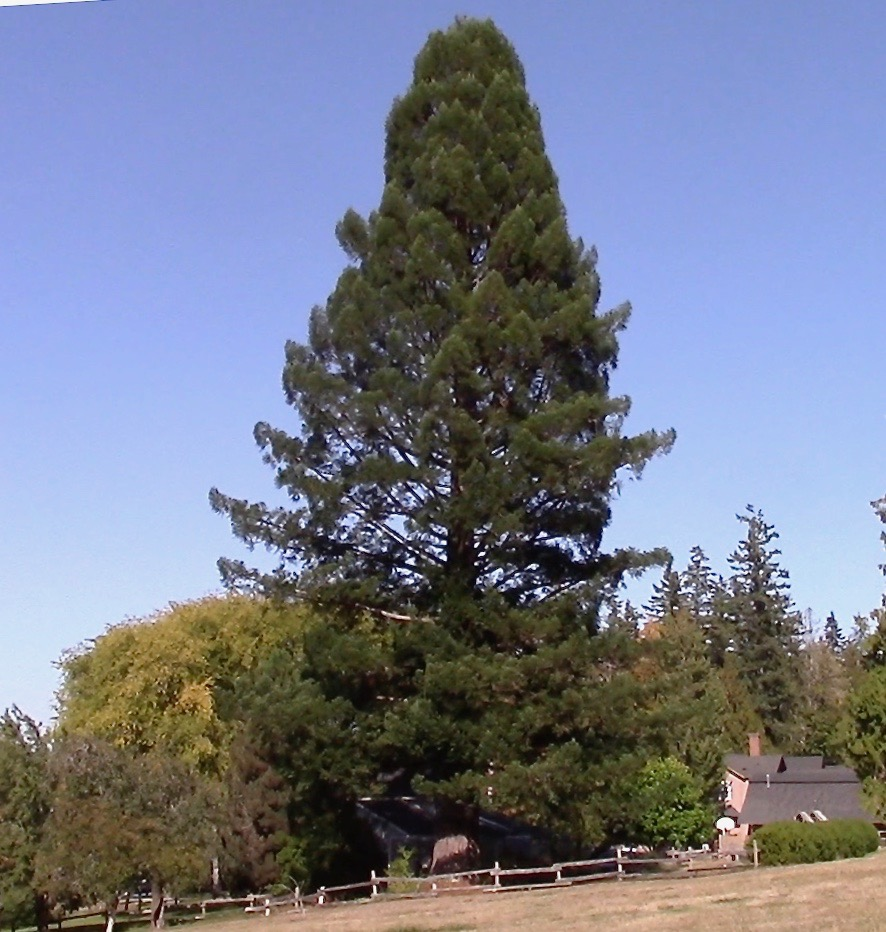
Coast redwood planted in 1948 in Seabeck, Washington, along the eastern seacoast of the Olympic Peninsula

Mature horticultural plantings of trees northward of their native ranges are a form of assisted migration experiment already underway. Because the original plantings likely did not include the goal of helping the trees migrate northward in a warming climate, this form of assisted migration can be called inadvertent, or unintended. Jesse Bellemare and colleagues may have coined the term in a paper published in 2015: "It appears that a subset of native plants, particularly those with ornamental value, might already have had opportunities to shift their ranges northward via inadvertent human assistance." Bellemare suggests, "Native plant horticulture is giving us some fascinating insights into what is likely to happen with climate change."

=== Horticultural plantings of Coast Redwood and Giant Sequoia ===
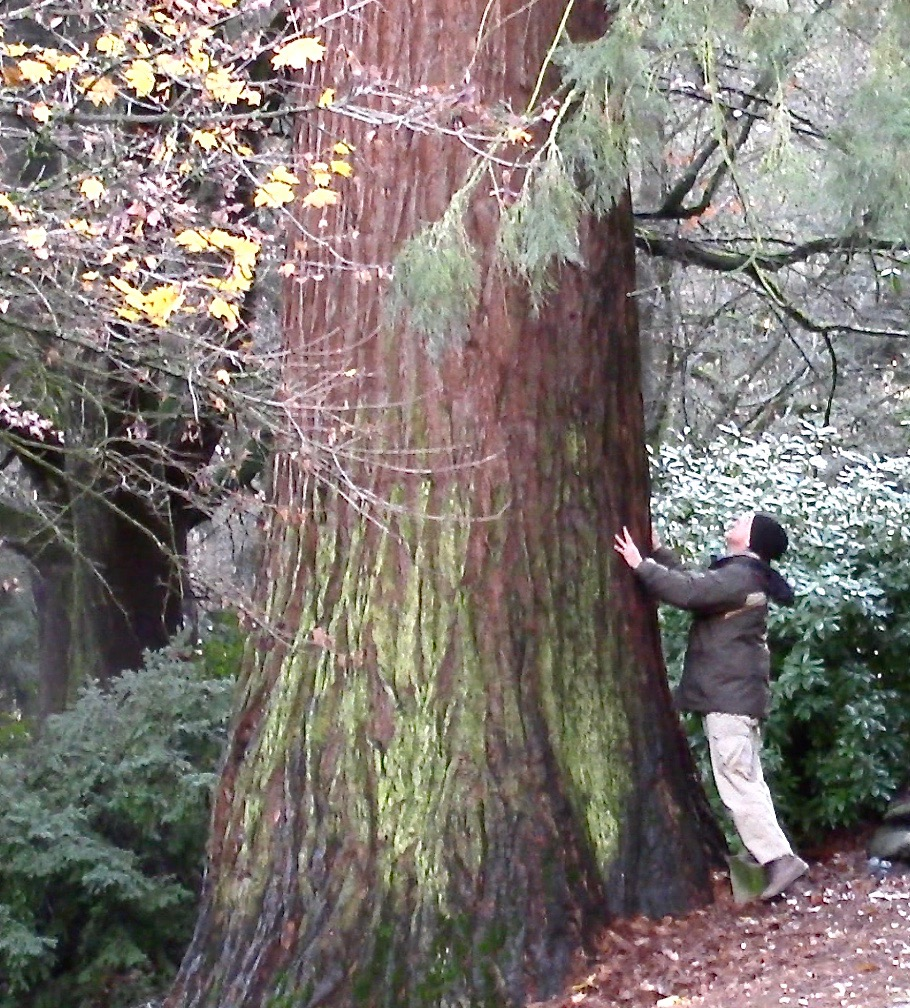
This is the largest giant sequoia (Sequoiadendron giganteum) among more than a dozen that were planted early in the 20th century in Laurelhurst Park of Portland, Oregon.

The tallest tree in the world is the coast redwood; the most massive tree is the closely related giant sequoia. Both have non-overlapping native ranges limited to California, although the coast redwood extends a few miles northward along the southern-most coast of Oregon. Both species have been planted as landscaping trees in urban areas hundreds of miles northward, in latitude, of their native ranges, including Washington state and British Columbia. In 2022 a Canadian Forestry Service publication used such northward horticultural plantings, along with a review of research detailing redwood's paleobiogeography and current range conditions, as grounds for proposing that Canada's Vancouver Island already offered "narrow strips of optimal habitat" for extending the range of coast redwood.

Video-documentation and analysis of a sampling of horticultural plantings of both species of California trees reveals strong growth from Portland to Seattle—substantially north of their native ranges. While horticulturally planted coast redwood and giant sequoia regularly produce cones in this northward region, only coast redwood is documented as having fully naturalized. This is evidenced by seedlings and saplings growing nearby the original plantings.

=== Northward planting of Coast Redwood in tree farms ===
In 2023 a site near Seattle hosted the annual meeting of the Washington Farm Forest Association. The group visited "a thriving stand of 33-year-old redwoods" that had been deliberately planted at the family-owned tree farm in 1990. PropagationNation, a citizen-group promoting the planting of both coast redwood and giant sequoia into the Pacific Northwest, posted a report on the history of the redwood grove and the group's experience at the site. The grove was reported to be growing faster than that of a native tree species that had been planted in an adjacent section of the property. In 2008, the 18-year-old redwoods were the same height as the stand of 38-year-old Douglas fir growing nearby. Current measurements report height growth of about 4 feet per year. The now 33-year-old redwoods are 135 feet tall.

When asked about the farm's current goals in managing the grove of redwoods, the owner replied, "My only goal is to grow the tallest trees in the world."

The actions of the citizen group Propagation Nation became controversial in late 2023. In October, a lengthy New York Times Magazine article reported favorably on the group's distribution of redwood seedlings to tree farms, public parks, and private individuals in a broad region surrounding the city of Seattle. In December, the Associated Press exclusively reported criticism from professionals in the region and nationally: While beginning to favor experiments in "assisted population migration" of the main native timber tree, Douglas-fir, professionals were united against large-scale plantings of California redwoods into the Pacific Northwest. The next month, January 2024, carried a regional news article that, once again, showed strong support as well as bold statements by the group's founder.

=== Northward plantings assist climate adaptation decisions ===
Private landowners, whether planting trees outside of native ranges for horticultural or commercial timber interests, are not by law required to seek governmental approval for doing so. Hence, the practice of visiting mature private or botanical garden plantings to assess the viability of intentional assisted migration of a tree species is not yet documented as standard practice. Thus far, the best-known example of documenting northward plantings pertains to a citizen group, Torreya Guardians, justifying their actions in planting seeds of an officially listed endangered species of tree, Florida torreya, hundreds of miles northward.

Diminishing fog along California's northern coast is already substantial, and its consequences would make coast redwood increasingly "drought stressed under a summer climate of reduced fog frequency and greater evaporative demand." Researchers have begun studying how diminishment of fog, owing to climate change, would make habitat unsuitable for Coast redwood in southern portions of their range. Even in northern sections of current range, climate change could constrict habitability such that low slopes along rivers would become the final refugia. Authors of the guest editorial in a 2021 issue of Journal of Ecology featured coast redwood in a concluding statement: "We expect that dominant tree species threatened within their range (e.g. coast redwood) would have to be translocated at a landscape level to protect overall habitat, ecosystem productivity and associated species."

The sudden deaths of some previously healthy giant sequoias, which are native to the western slope of the Sierra Nevada mountain range, are correlated with California's record drought of 2012–2016. The deaths caught scientists and national park managers by surprise during the next few years, as drought-weakened trees succumbed to bark beetle infestations in their thin-barked upper branches. Because the drought killed an enormous number of the common pine species and firs that surround the discrete groves of giant sequoias, a wildfire of catastrophic intensity, the Castle Fire, swept through the region in 2020. The innate fire resistance of even the tallest and sturdiest sequoias could not protect the groves. A tenth of the entire native population of giant sequoia is estimated to have been killed. An interagency Giant Sequoia Lands Coalition formed in 2021, reporting that "giant sequoias are known for their resistance to insects and disease and their fire-adapted life cycle, however the 2012–2016 drought appears to have been a tipping point for giant sequoias and other Sierra Nevada mixed-conifer forests."

== Forest understory plants ==
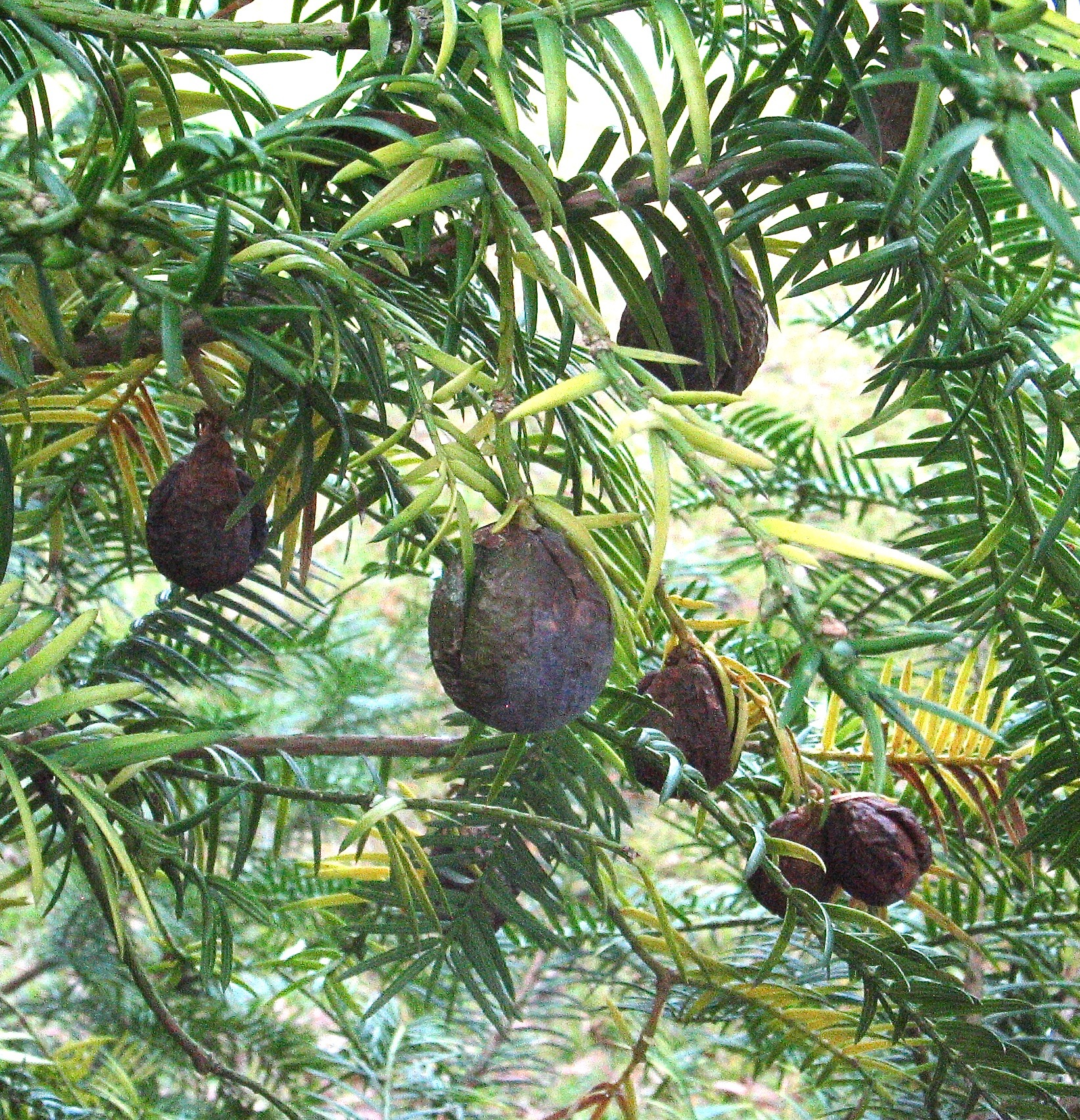
Seeds of Florida torreya ripen to a purple color at this horticultural planting in eastern North Carolina.

Natural and healthy forests include a diversity of native understory plants. Because understory plants require a healthy canopy of overstory trees, assisted migration of understory plants is only occasionally mentioned in the forestry publications on the topic of climate adaptation.

Two genera, Taxus and Torreya, within the ancient yew family called Taxaceae have been proposed as important understory components for their value in providing ecosystem services for forest restoration and climate adaptation projects in China. The authors conclude, "Taxaceae species can contribute to generate structurally complex stands of increased value for biodiversity and increased stability, hereby also contributing to climate change mitigation as well as other important ecosystem services. Further, using rare Taxaceae species in reforestation will also help conserve these rare species in a changing future." Both genera have distinct species native to the western and eastern regions of North America. Only Florida torreya is critically endangered, however, and a citizen group called Torreya Guardians has been planting this species hundreds of kilometers north of its native range.

=== Inadvertent assisted migration of ornamental understory plants ===
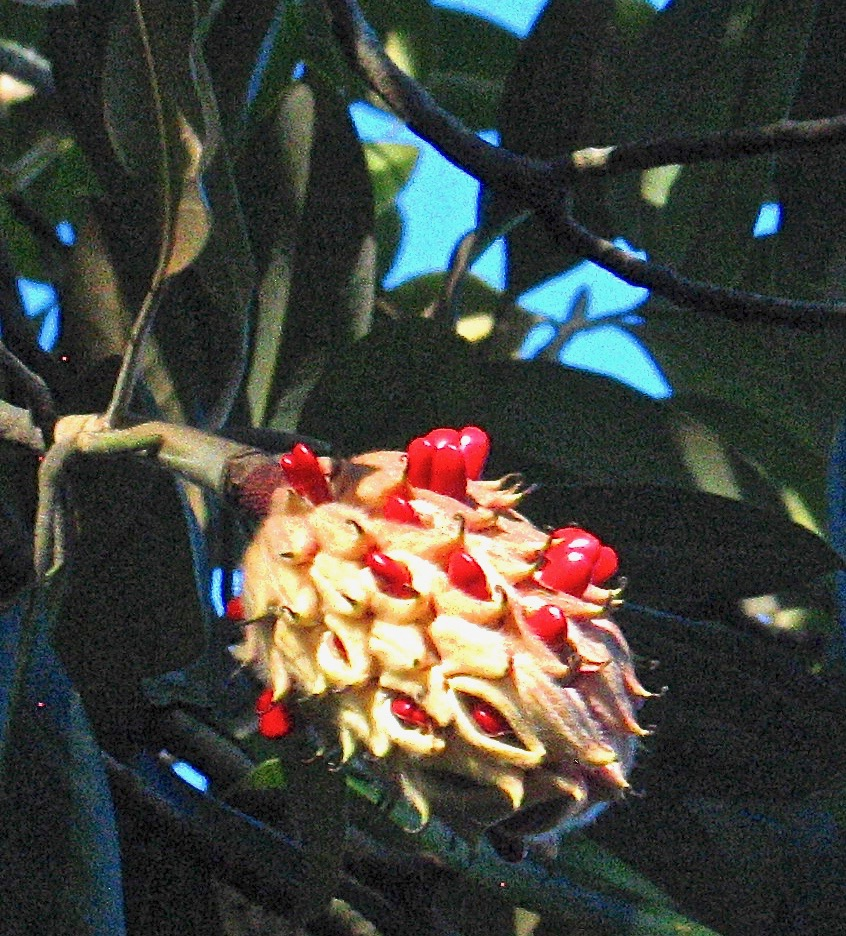
The evergreen southern magnolia is native to the southeastern US and bears the typical magnolia structure of fruit with fleshy seeds.

Native species of Magnolia in eastern North America have been widely planted for their ornamental beauty in horticultural contexts far north of their native ranges. Although nearly half of all Magnolia species are threatened globally, human-assisted movement and cultivation of some species have led to their survival and expansion far beyond native range. The ongoing naturalization of beyond-range Magnolia taxa has been associated with climate change. Botanists have documented examples where such plantings have fully naturalized—that is, where nearby seedlings and saplings suggest that not only were viable seeds produced, but the habitat and climate were favorable for seedlings to establish and grow. These are examples of inadvertent assisted migration. Botanist Todd Rounsaville suggests, "There is an important need to study and report the ecological processes of tree naturalization in novel environments to guide policy making and forest management relating to climate change, species range-shifts, and assisted migration."

One example is the southern magnolia, Magnolia grandiflora. This small, evergreen tree is widely planted as an ornamental as far north as New England and Michigan. The tree tolerates those regions, which are far north of its native range along the coast of southeastern US. But no instances of full naturalization have been documented at such high latitudes. In 2011 botanists documented naturalization near Chapel Hill, North Carolina, which is more than a hundred kilometers beyond and inland of its northernmost native range in North Carolina.

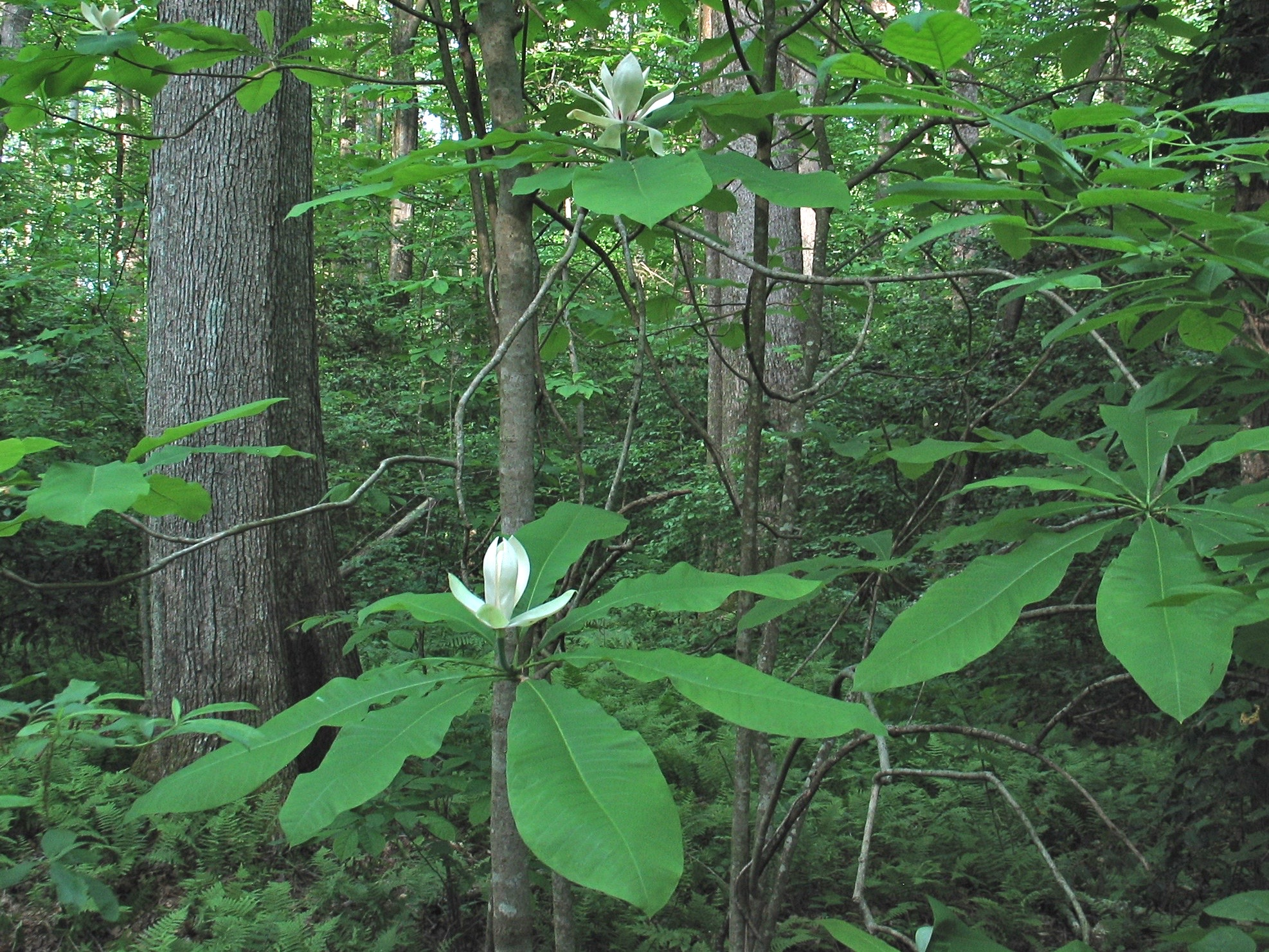
Magnolia tripetala in flower in northeast Alabama

Bigleaf magnolia, Magnolia macrophylla, another widely planted ornamental, has been documented as fully naturalized in the state of Connecticut. This is 130 kilometers northeast of its historically native range. Because climate models project severe contraction in the southerly portion of its native range, William Moorhead recommends that "additional sites for this conspicuous species should be sought in the area of similar climate conditions between Long Island and central Connecticut, such as along the northern coast of Long Island Sound and in the lower Hudson Valley."

Umbrella magnolia, Magnolia tripetala, has been documented as naturalized in more than a dozen locations well north of its historic native range. Dispersal problems apparently limited its post-glacial range expansion to regions south of the farthest extent of continental ice. While horticultural plantings northward into Massachusetts as early as the 18th century demonstrated species tolerance for the then-climate, only recently have these old horticultural plantings begun to extend offspring into adjacent suitable habitat—becoming quite populous in even full-canopy forests, according to botanists Jesse Bellemare and Claudia Deeg. They write, "The pattern of relatively synchronous escape and establishment of this southern tree species in the last 20 to 30 years seems most consistent with a link to recent climatic warming in the northeastern US."

== Evidence and causes of lagging tree migration ==
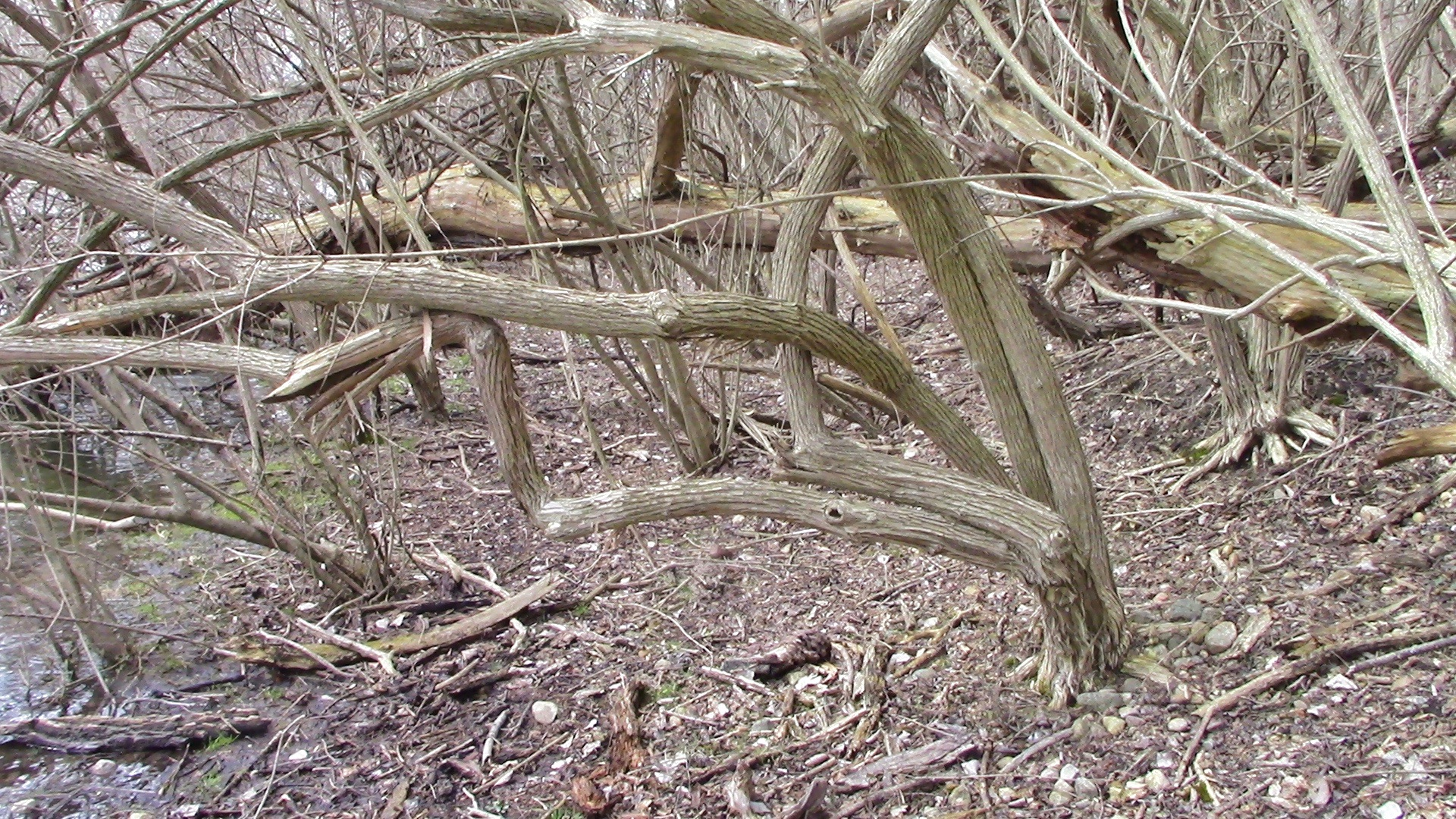
Lonicera maackii, native in Asia, can shade out native canopy seedlings in the eastern USA, as in this regrowth forest in southern Michigan.

Forest habitat fragmentation caused by agriculture and residential development have long been recognized as impediments to the ability of plants to geographically track climate change. Several additional human stressors are now also recognized as lessening the ability of trees to adapt to climate change by "migrating poleward." One such stress is where native deer densities are abnormally high, owing to the absence of predators and landscape or management conditions that preclude human hunting at adequate scale. Under those conditions, tree species whose leaves and twigs are palatable to deer are unable to launch next generations, even when still well represented in the forest canopy. Another stress derives from non-native invasive plants that can rapidly occupy a canopy opening, thereby shading out native tree seedlings that might otherwise have been able to establish.
