= Wild by Design =

2022 environmental book by Laura J. Martin

Wild by Design: The Rise of Ecological Restoration
- Author: Laura J. Martin
- Language: English
- Subject: Ecological restoration; Biodiversity
- Genre: Environmental history; History of biology
- Published: 2022
- Publisher: Harvard University Press
- Media type: Print
- Pages: 336
- ISBN: 9780674979420

Wild by Design: The Rise of Ecological Restoration is a 2022 book by Laura J. Martin, Associate Professor of Environmental Studies at Williams College. The book explains how ecological restoration became a global pursuit. Martin defines restoration as "an attempt to co-design nature with non-human collaborators." Wild by Design calls for the unification of ecological restoration and social justice.

== Content ==
Wild by Design begins with the founding of the American Bison Society in 1905 and ends with efforts to use assisted migration and assisted evolution to save species from climate change. During this period restoration transformed “from a diffuse, uncoordinated practice into a scientific discipline and an international and increasingly privatized undertaking."

The restoration movement began in the early 1900s when conservationists dissatisfied with gun and hunting restrictions argued that bison could be bred and then released onto designated reservations. Showing that the first bison reservations in the United States were established on Indian reservations, Martin argues these restoration efforts focused on benefits for white settlers while disregarding Native American sovereignty.

The 1930s were a key time for restoration efforts. As ecology became a professional science, ecologists began to frame nature reservations as scientific control sites for their studies. Pursuing scientific investigation, restorationists sought to protect ecosystems like grasslands that had previously attracted little attention. At the same time, women botanists and landscape architects like Eloise Butler, Edith Roberts, and Elsa Rehmann developed the science of native plant propagation. Influenced by their work, Aldo Leopold and other Ecological Society of America members began to manage animals by manipulating plant species rather than eliminating predators or artificially feeding species.

The Atomic Age led ecologists to shift from restoring individual species to ecosystem restoration. Ecologists traced fallout from nuclear weapons as it moved through organisms and ecosystems. During the 1960s, the U.S. Atomic Energy Commission funded simulations of World War III, in which ecologists intentionally destroyed ecosystems to study how biodiversity recovered. E. O. Wilson, for instance, poisoned entire islands off the Florida coast to study their restoration. Through these experiments, ecologists developed the narrative that nature could be irreversibly damaged. The diversity-stability hypothesis emerged from these experiments, along with the idea that certain species are more resilient to environmental disturbance than others.

Part III of Wild by Design analyses the impact of post-1970s environmental laws on restoration efforts and why the goal of returning ecosystems to precolonial conditions emerged. For decades, the U.S. Fish and Wildlife Service had killed native predators, but with the Endangered Species Act of 1973 in place, the FWS began captive breeding programs for endangered wildlife, including predators. Meanwhile, land trusts like The Nature Conservancy found it increasingly difficult to secure federal permission to work with endangered and threatened species and they shifted to killing non-native species. Invasive species management became a widespread practice among land trusts, and the number of land trusts skyrocketed in the 1980s. Land managers "naturalized the precolonial baseline, obfuscating their role in designing native nature." The international Society for Ecological Restoration was founded by land trust managers in 1988.

In the 1990s restoration was corporatized and consolidated. Martin argues that wetland restoration practices under the Clean Water Act created the precedent for international carbon offsetting. The Walt Disney Company, The Nature Conservancy, the Florida Department of Environmental Regulation, and others brokered the Disney Wilderness Preserve as the world's first large off-site mitigation project. Noting that offsetting projects are often based in the Global South, while those purchasing offsetting “credits” are in the Global North, Martin denounces carbon colonialism as an example of how restoration can create unequal distributions of power and resources.

== Reception ==
Professor Peter Brewitt praised the book as timely, engaging and entertaining, as well as for being the first to adequately tell the "century-spanning story of ecological restoration." He predicts it will be a foundational work for those researching restoration history and politics. Yet Brewitt also suggests Martin's treatment doesn't always do full justice to the wide scope of her subject, and in particular that the book fails to clarify how representative the cases it features are. Writer Celeste Pepitone-Nahas suggested the book's historical sweep alone makes it a major achievement, though said she would have preferred more coverage on the efforts of Indigenous activists. Author Julie Dunlap praised the book as incisive and for transiting Martin's "erudite perspective", but regretted the relative lack of coverage on efforts to protect nature from global warming.

== Awards ==
Wild by Design won the 2023 John Brinckerhoff Jackson Book Prize from the Foundation for Landscape Studies. It was a finalist for the George Perkins Marsh Prize from the American Society for Environmental History and the 2023 Project Syndicate Sustainability Book Award.

== See also ==
History of biology
Conservation in the United States
Restoration ecology
U.S. Fish and Wildlife Service
Rewilding
