= Wildness =

Quality of being wild or untamed

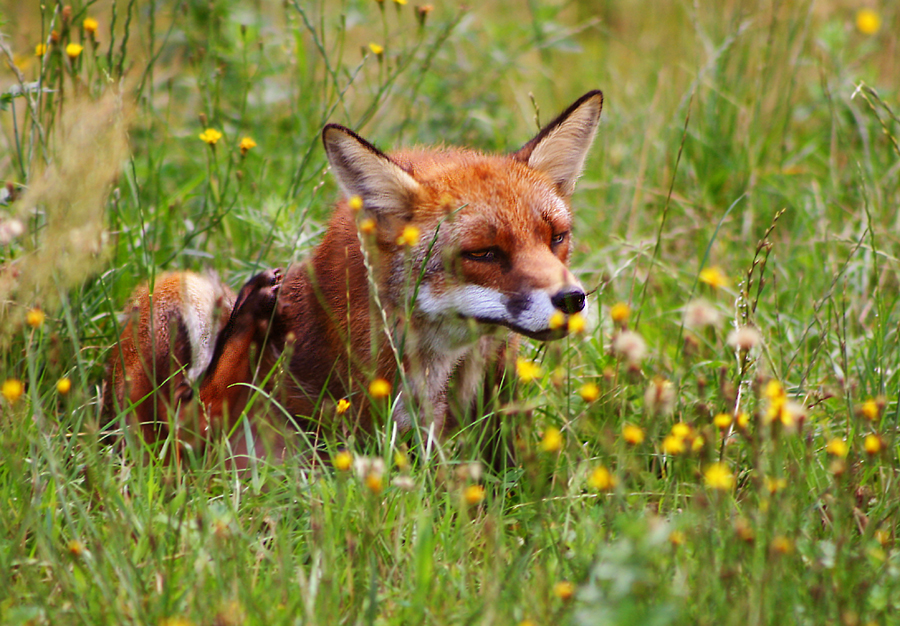
A wild red fox

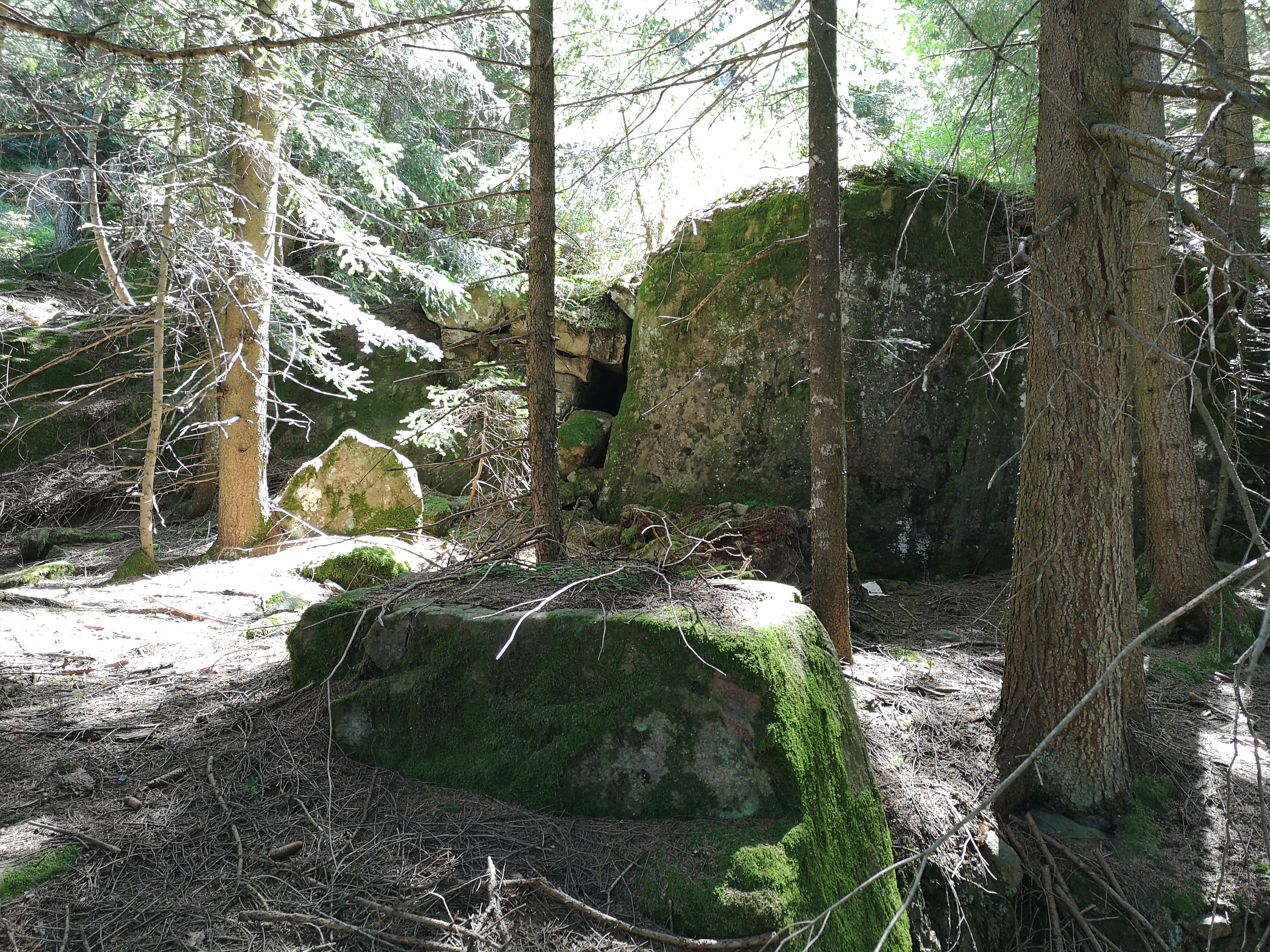
A wild forest

Wildness, in its literal sense, is the quality of being wild or untamed. Beyond this, it has been defined as a quality produced in nature and that which is not domesticated. More recently, it has been defined as "a quality of interactive processing between organism and nature where the realities of base natures are met, allowing the construction of durable systems" and "the autonomous ecological influences of nonhuman organisms."

== Cultural perceptions of wildness ==
People have explored the contrast of wildness versus tameness throughout recorded history. The earliest great work of literature, the Epic of Gilgamesh, tells a story of a wild man Enkidu in opposition to Gilgamesh who personifies civilization. In the story, Enkidu is defeated by Gilgamesh and becomes civilized. Cultures vary in their perception of the separation of humans from nature, with western civilization drawing a sharp contrast between the two while the traditions of many indigenous peoples have always seen humans as part of nature. The perception of man's place in nature and civilization has also changed over time. In Western civilization, for example, Darwinism and environmentalism have renewed the perception of humans as part of nature, rather than separate from it.

Wildness is often mentioned in the writings of naturalists, such as John Muir and David Brower, where it is admired for its freshness and otherness. Henry David Thoreau wrote "In wildness is the preservation of the world". Some artists and photographers such as Eliot Porter explore wildness in the themes of their works. The benefits of reconnecting with nature by seeing the achievements of wildness is an area being investigated by ecopsychology.

Attempts to identify the characteristics of wildness are varied. One consideration sees wildness as that part of nature which is not controllable by humans. Nature retains a measure of autonomy, or wildness, apart from human constructions. In Wild by Design, Laura J. Martin reviews attempts to manage nature while respecting and even generating the wildness of other species. Another version of this theme is that wildness produces things that are natural, while humans produce things that are artificial (man-made). Ambiguities about the distinction between the natural and the artificial animate much of art, literature and philosophy. There is the perception that naturally produced items have a greater elegance over artificial things. Modern zoos seek to improve the health and vigour of animals by simulating natural settings, in a move away from stark man-made structures.

Another view of wildness is that it is a social construct, and that humans cannot be considered innately ‘unnatural. As wildness is claimed to be a quality that builds from animals and ecosystems, it often fails to be considered within reductionist theories for nature.

Meanwhile, an ecological perspective sees wildness as "(the degree of) subjection to natural selection pressures", many of which emerge independently from the biosphere. Thus modern civilization - contrasted with all humanity – can be seen as an 'unnatural' force (lacking wildness) as it strongly insulates its population from many natural selection mechanisms, including interspecific competition such as predation and disease, as well as some intraspecific phenomena.

== Wildness in animals ==
The importance of maintaining wildness in animals is recognized in the management of Wilderness areas. Feeding wild animals in national parks for example, is usually discouraged because the animals may lose the skills they need to fend for themselves. Human interventions may also upset continued natural selection pressures upon the population, producing a version of domestication within wildlife (Peterson et al. 2005).

Tameness implies a reduction in wildness, where animals become more easily handled by humans. Some animals are easier to tame than others, and are amenable to domestication.

=== Rating scales for mouse wildness ===
In a clinical setting, wildness has been used as a scale to rate the ease with which various strains of laboratory mice can be captured and handled (Wahlsten et al. 2003):

Wildness rating	Behavioral response	
Wildness rating	Capture	Handling
0	Minimal resistance	Minor struggle
1	Evades touch by running around cage	Squeaks or squeals
2	Jumps onto wall of cage	Vigorous struggle and/or twisting, shaking
3	Jumps out of cage completely onto table	Attempts to bite
4	Runs from vicinity of cage	Bites experimenter
5	Jumps off table or apparatus onto floor	
6	Runs around room	

In this sense, "wildness" may be interpreted as "tendency to respond with anxiety to handling". That there is no necessary connection between this factor and the state of wildness per se, given that some animals in the wild may be handled with little or no cause of anxiety. However, this factor does clearly indicate an animal's resistance to being handled.

=== Degrees of domestication ===
A classification system can be set out showing the spectrum from wild to domesticated animal states:

- Wild: These species experience their full life cycles without deliberate human intervention.
- Raised at zoos or botanical gardens (captive): These species are nurtured and sometimes bred under human control, but remain as a group essentially indistinguishable in appearance or behaviour from their wild counterparts. (Zoos and botanical gardens sometimes exhibit domesticated or feral animals and plants such as camels, mustangs, and some orchids.)
- Raised commercially (captive or semidomesticated): These species are ranched or farmed in large numbers for food, commodities, or the pet trade, but as a group they are not substantially altered in appearance or behavior. Examples include the elephant, ostrich, deer, alligator, cricket, pearl oyster, and ball python. (These species are sometimes referred to as partially domesticated.)
- Domesticated: These species or varieties are bred and raised under human control for many generations and are substantially altered as a group in appearance or behaviour. Examples include the canary, pigeons, the budgerigar, the peach-faced lovebird, dogs, cats, sheep, cattle, chickens, llamas, guinea pigs and laboratory mice.

This classification system does not account for several complicating factors: genetically modified organisms, feral populations, and hybridization. Many species that are farmed or ranched are now being genetically modified. This creates a unique category of them because it alters the organisms as a group but in ways unlike traditional domestication. Feral organisms are members of a population that was once raised under human control, but is now living and multiplying outside of human control. Examples include mustangs. Hybrids can be wild, domesticated, or both: a liger is a hybrid of two wild animals, a mule is a hybrid of two domesticated animals, and a beefalo is a cross between a wild and a domestic animal.

== Wildness in human psychology ==
The basic idea of ecopsychology is that while the human mind is shaped by the modern social world, it can be readily inspired and comforted by the wider natural world, because that is the arena in which it originally evolved. Mental health or health cannot be understood in the narrow context of only intrapsychic phenomena or social relations. One also has to include the relationship of humans to other species and ecosystems. These relations have a deep evolutionary history; reach a natural affinity within the structure of their brains and they have deep psychic significance in the present time, in spite of urbanization. Humans are dependent on healthy nature not only for their physical sustenance, but for mental health, too.

== Wildness in political philosophy ==
The concept of a state of nature was first posited by the 17th century English philosopher Thomas Hobbes in Leviathan. Hobbes described the concept in the Latin phrase bellum omnium contra omnes, meaning "the war of all against all." In this state any person has a natural right to do anything to preserve their own liberty or safety. Famously, he believed that such a condition would lead to a "war of every man against every man" and make life "solitary, poor, nasty, brutish, and short."

Hobbes's view was challenged in the eighteenth century by Jean-Jacques Rousseau, who claimed that Hobbes was taking socialized persons and simply imagining them living outside of the society they were raised in. He affirmed instead that people were born neither good nor bad; men knew neither vice nor virtue since they had almost no dealings with each other. Their bad habits are the products of civilization specifically social hierarchies, property, and markets. Another criticism put forth by Karl Marx is his concept of species-being, or the unique potential of humans for dynamic, creative, and cooperative relations between each other. For Marx and others in his line of critical theory, alienated and abstracted social relations prevent the fulfillment of this potential (see anomie).

David Hume's view brings together and challenges the theories of Rousseau and Hobbes. He posits that in the natural state we are born wicked and evil because of, for instance, the cry of the baby that demands attention. Like Rousseau, he believes that society shapes us, but that we are born evil and it is up to society to shape us into who we become.

Thoreau made many statements on wildness:

In Wildness is the preservation of the World. — "Walking"

I wish to speak a word for Nature, for absolute Freedom and Wildness, as contrasted with a Freedom and Culture merely civil, — to regard man as an inhabitant, or a part and parcel of Nature, rather than a member of society. — "Walking"

I long for wildness, a nature which I cannot put my foot through, woods where the wood thrush forever sings, where the hours are early morning ones, and there is dew on the grass, and the day is forever unproved, where I might have a fertile unknown for a soil about me. — Journal, 22 June 1853

As I came home through the woods with my string of fish, trailing my pole, it being now quite dark, I caught a glimpse of a woodchuck stealing across my path, and felt a strange thrill of savage delight, and was strongly tempted to seize and devour him raw; not that I was hungry then, except for that wildness which he represented. — Walden

What we call wildness is a civilization other than our own. — Journal, 16 February 1859

In Wildness is the preservation of the World. — "Walking"

We need the tonic of wildness — to wade sometimes in marshes where the bittern and the meadow-hen lurk, and hearing the booming of the snipe; to smell the whispering sedge where only some wilder and more solitary fowl builds her nest, and the mink crawls with its belly close o the ground. — Walden

It is in vain to dream of a wildness distant from ourselves. There is none such. — Journal, 30 August 1856

The most alive is the wildest. — "Walking"

Whatever has not come under the sway of man is wild. In this sense original and independent men are wild — not tamed and broken by society. — Journal, 3 September 1851

Trench says a wild man is a willed man. Well, then, a man of will who does what he wills or wishes, a man of hope and of the future tense, for not only the obstinate is willed, but far more the constant and persevering. The obstinate man, properly speaking, is one who will not. The perseverance of the saints is positive willedness, not a mere passive willingness. The fates are wild, for they will; and the Almighty is wild above all, as fate is. — Journal, 27 June 1853

== See also ==
- Behavioural sciences
- Ecology
- Ecopsychology
- Environmental psychology
- Permaforestry
- Wildcrafting
- Original position
- Second of John Locke's Two Treatises of Government

== Sources ==
- Callicott, J. B., "A critique of and an alternative to the wilderness idea", Wild Earth 4: 54-59 (2004).
- Cookson, L. J., "Wildness, the forgotten partner of evolution", Gatherings (Journal of the International Community for Ecopsychology), 2004.
- Evanoff, R. J., "Reconciling realism and constructivism in environmental ethics", Environmental Values 14: 61-81 (2005).
- Micoud, A., "Vers un Nouvel Animal Sauvage: Le Sauvage ‘Naturalisé Vivant’", Natures Sciences Sociétés 1: 202-210 (1993).
- Peterson, M. N. et al, "Wildlife loss through domestication: the case of endangered key deer", Conservation Biology 19: 939-944 (2005).
- Thoreau, H., "Walking" in The Writings of Henry D. Thoreau (Walden edition), Boston: Houghton Mifflin and Company, 1906.
- Wahlsten, D., Metten, P. and Crabbe, J. C., "A rating scale for wildness and ease of handling laboratory mice: results for 21 inbred strains tested in two laboratories", Genes, Brain and Behavior 2: 71-79 (2003).
