= Edith Roberts =

Edith Roberts may refer to:

- Edith Roberts (actress), American silent film actress
- Edith A. Roberts, American botanist
