= Assisted gene flow =

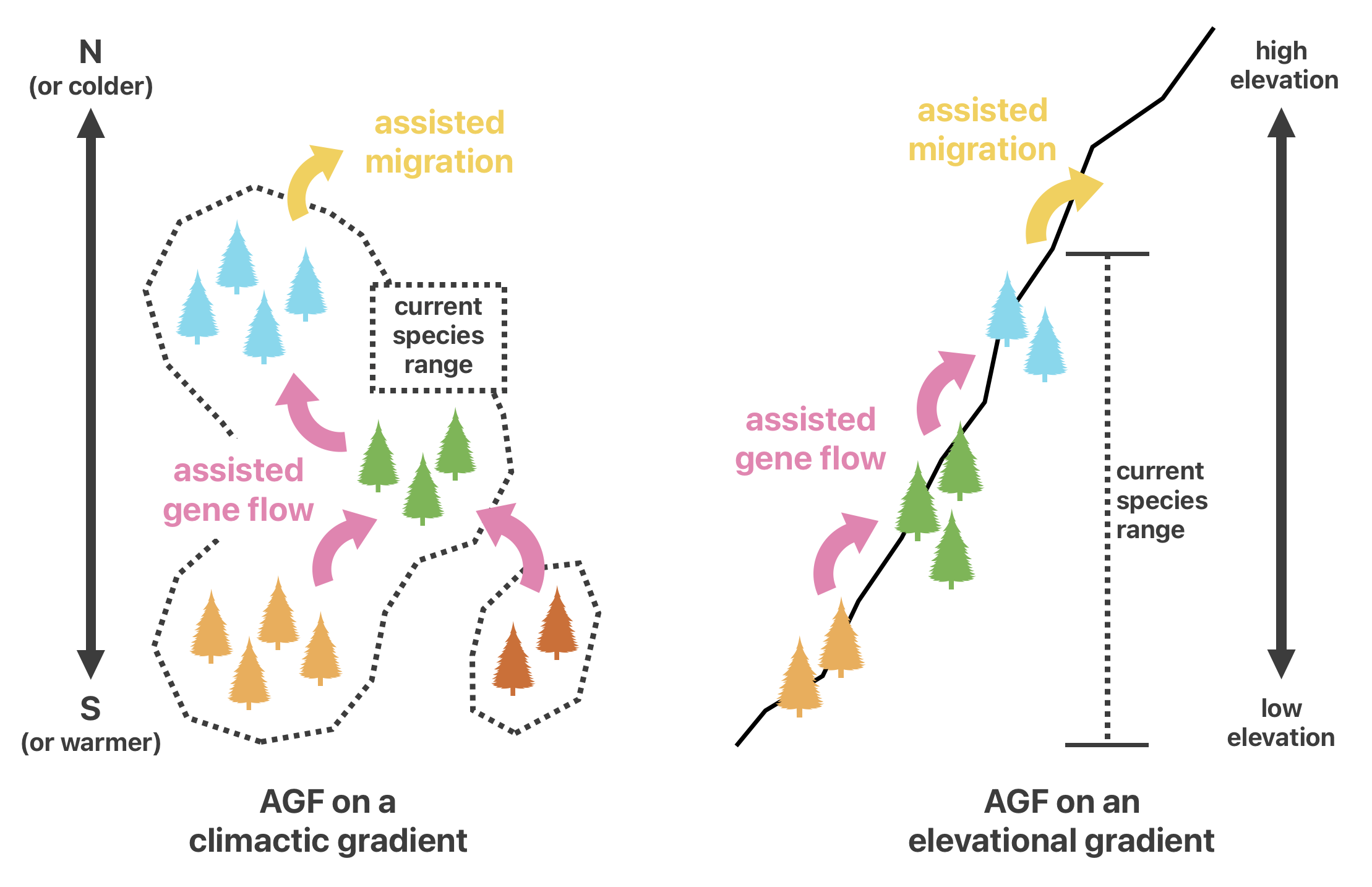
Assisted gene flow (pink) contrasted with assisted migration (yellow) on a climactic/geographic gradient (left) and an elevational gradient (right). Arrows represent managed movement from source population to target population. Color of tree clusters represents different population ecotypes. Note that this figure does not represent all possible AGF management plans such as sourcing from multiple populations, using elements of ex situ conservation, or combination with other conservation techniques.

Assisted gene flow (AGF) is a conservation management strategy that moves individuals or gametes between populations of plant or animal species within the species's existing range. This strategy responds to the effects of climate change by facilitating adaptation to projected local climate conditions. For example, an AGF management plan may move individuals from a source population (or populations) living in a warm region to a target population in a colder, but rapidly warming region.

Not to be confused with assisted migration, AGF is a strategy focused on gene flow between existing populations rather than an introduction of individuals to new or restored habitat. AGF is also similar to genetic rescue, a conservation technique intended to prevent species extinction; however, AGF emphasizes long-term conservation and has broader applications. For species that experience local adaptation to historical climate conditions and have populations with genetic compatibility, AGF can be an effective climate change mitigation strategy to help maintain genetic fitness in threatened species.

== History ==
Although the term "assisted gene flow" was first used in a published article in 2013 by Aitken & Whitlock, the concept was recognized as early as 1992 by Ledig & Kitzmiller who wrote about reforestation under the threat of climate change. In this publication Ledig & Kitzmiller suggested that planting programs should consider sourcing seed from further south or lower elevations. The term "targeted gene flow" has also been used to describe the movement of individuals with desired genetic traits into target populations as a conservation strategy. Research on AGF as a conservation strategy, including the analysis of trees and shrubs, herbaceous flowers, reef corals, as well as terrestrial animal species, has shown promising results and revealed potential genetic risks.

== Applications and benefits ==
The ultimate benefit of AGF is the protection of species' health and productivity, including economically important and keystone species, to conserve biodiversity in the face of climate change. Threatened species are at risk of maladaptation due to the rate of natural adaptation falling behind the rapid rate of environmental change, which causes loss of ecosystem function as well as the loss of resources and ecosystem services they provide. AGF can help introduce genotypes that are pre-adapted to new local climates or increase the frequency of climate adapted genotypes that already exist within the population, strengthening a species evolutionary potential and persistence through environmental change.

=== Accelerating gene flow ===
In stable environmental conditions, natural selection drives adaptation to the local environment; however, as environmental conditions change over time, species can adapt to new conditions by exhibiting natural processes like gene flow. Gene flow is simply the transfer of genes between populations of the same species. Natural gene flow tends to exhibit a leptokurtic distribution, as opposed to a normal distribution, in which more individuals and gametes distribute a shorter distance from the source population than further. As anthropogenic activity continues to increase the rate of climate change, adaptation by way of these natural processes may not be able to keep up. Additionally, habitat fragmentation caused by human development also prevents natural adaptation by inhibiting gene flow. AGF can direct gene flow in a targeted direction at any desired distance, working to overcome these environmental barriers by speeding up the natural adaptive process.

=== Assisted gene flow vs. genetic rescue ===
Genetic rescue is a conservation strategy that targets small, isolated populations that have lost significant genetic diversity and are under threat of extinction. Similar to AGF, genetic rescue introduces new individuals into the target population with the goal of restoring genetic diversity and increasing overall fitness. The two methods deviate in their ultimate goal; Genetic rescue attempts to alleviate inbreeding depression to bolster fitness and promote population growth, while AGF is more directional, aiming to promote genetic adaptation to future climate conditions. While genetic rescue may be considered a form of AGF, it is a short-term conservation solution focused on reducing extinction risk in small populations. Genetic rescue efforts tend to source individuals from populations with similar environmental climates as the target population.

AGF focuses on longer term conservation, sourcing individuals from populations that are adapted to different climate conditions that match future conditions facing the target population. AGF has applications to a greater range of potential recipient populations. In small, threatened populations, AGF is identical to genetic rescue, reducing inbreeding depression and increasing genetic diversity. AGF also assists larger or more fit populations, such as foundation species, that have greater evolutionary potential, but may experience increased stress as climates shift faster than natural adaptation can occur.

=== Assisted gene flow as assisted migration ===
Assisted migration is another conservation strategy which involves the anthropogenic movement of species to more suitable habitats in response to changing environmental conditions. AGF can be considered a type of assisted migration which focuses on the movement of individuals or populations of a species to areas within its existing range, while assisted migration is broader, including the introduction of a species to a new geographic location beyond its current range. Due to the nature of AGF maintaining the species' existing range, the ecological risks of moving individuals or gametes are much lower than introductions to new areas.

== Risks and limitations ==
Introducing foreign genotypes into a new population always runs the risk of reducing genetic integrity. For AGF, outbreeding depression, or a reduction in the fitness of offspring genotypes relative to parental lineages, is the most significant risk. Outbreeding depression can be caused by negative epistasis, chromosomal incompatibilities, and loss of locally adapted alleles within the recipient population. Results of these incompatibilities can lead to detrimental effects such as phenological mismatch.

For example, research has shown that AGF has the potential to shift the timing of flowering in plants, which poses a threat to plant pollinator relationships. Additionally, while AGF can introduce beneficial alleles, pre-adapted to certain climate conditions, it can also introduce deleterious alleles which are maladapted to other environmental factors. Lastly, AGF risks genetic swamping if the proportion of introduced individuals or the fitness of new individuals is too high. In both AGF and genetic rescue strategies, foreign genotypes could outcompete local genotypes and lead to the loss of unique genetic lineages.

In addition to the limited parameters on the size and current range of the target species, AGF may be difficult to achieve in long lived species. Successful implementation of AGF often takes several generations for beneficial adaptations to accrue and make an impact. This process may be too slow among species with long generation times, an important consideration for applications in forestry.

Another important consideration is the accuracy of projected climate conditions. Climate projections can be uncertain and many variables must be accounted for. While the purpose of AGF is to conserve species threatened by changing climate, offspring still need to be able to establish and survive under typical conditions. Experts recommend that AGF management plans match the environment of source populations with intermediate climate projections to maximize survival.

== Identifying source and target populations ==
A key factor in determining potential source populations for AGF is a strong history of local adaptation to desired climate conditions. For plant species, this can be determined experimentally through transplanting in common gardens or controlled greenhouse experiments and assessing phenotypic trait inheritance. However, indicators of a viable source population are not limited to ecological factors. Genomic analysis can identify adaptive genetic variation and reveal which populations are best adapted to desired conditions, as well as which populations are most at risk. This can be especially helpful when assessing potential AGF strategies for small populations of endangered species.

Genomic offset has become a promising method of genomic analysis that identifies adaptive genetic variation in populations of candidate species for AGF. This method uses a genotype-environment analysis of a population's genomic data to establish a statistical relationship between allele frequencies and environmental factors. This model is then used to measure the mismatch between current genetic composition and the composition needed for adaptation to projected climate conditions. A genomic offset approach called "risk of nonadaptedness" or RONA, which predicts the required allele frequency shift needed in a population to adapt to future environmental conditions, is an analytical tool that has been recommended for use in AGF strategies.

== Research examples ==
=== Successful AGF ===
==== Elkhorn coral (Acropora palmata) ====
A successful implementation of AGF was accomplished in 2018 on populations of Acropora palmata or elkhorn coral. Gene flow was initiated by in vitro fertilization of freshly collected coral eggs from Curaçao using cryopreserved sperm from Florida, Puerto Rico, and Curaçao. Despite these coral populations being genetically isolated after more than a 95% decline in population, the risk of outbreeding depression in corals is considered low because they have retained high genetic diversity and exhibit an outcrossed population genetic structure. Researchers found that genetically distinct populations of A. palmata could produce a successful population of offspring and that AGF is a viable option for the conservation of endangered coral populations.

==== Montane cushion plant (Silene ciliata Pourr.) ====
An example of AGF for a perennial plant species across an elevational gradient was tested by researchers in 2014. Silene ciliata is a perennial flowering plant species that grows in Mediterranean mountain ranges across Southern Europe. Since plant populations grow across steep elevational gradients, plants at lower elevations are projected to experience earlier snowmelt and onset of the summer drought period. Prior experimentation showed that plants from higher elevations flowered earlier when planted at lower elevation, suggesting that AGF from high to low populations may help advance flowering time to increase reproductive success and seedling survival ahead of the drought period. However results from the researchers' ex situ common garden experiment showed the opposite; gene flow from higher elevation populations delayed flowering time. The researchers suggested that because expression of flowering time is polygenic, the gene flow treatments may have led to a disruption of coadapted genes and the unexpected delay was the result of outbreeding depression.

==== Günther's toadlet (Pseudophryne guentheri) ====
Researchers in Australia set up a breeding experiment to assess methods of targeted gene flow in crawling frog species Pseudophryne guentheri, commonly known as Günther's toadlet. In 2017, adult frogs were collected in the field while the simulation of gene flow was conducted in a lab setting using in vitro fertilization of egg clutches. The results suggested that the risk of outbreeding depression increased with genetic, geographic and environmental distance between the source populations of breeding individuals.

=== Genomic offset ===
==== Dwarf birch (Betula nana) ====
Betula nana, or dwarf birch, populations in the UK have experienced accelerated decline due to habitat loss from anthropogenic activity and climate change. While UK populations still retain extant adaptive diversity, habitat fragmentation threatens to restrict gene flow and environmental adaptation. To better inform potential AGF strategies for a dwarf birch conservation program, researchers began a genomic analysis in 2013 searching for associations between allele frequencies and environmental conditions in Scottish populations.

This genomic offset method alongside a model of simulated AGF suggested that the best conservation approach would involve a translocation of individuals with locally adapted genotypes from the center of the species range into populations along the edges. From this genomic analysis, researchers concluded that dwarf birch would also need additional management strategies such as mitigating clearing practices like grazing and burning alongside AGF so that populations could eventually exhibit natural gene flow.

==== Netleaf oak (Quercus rugosa) ====
In 2018, researchers published a genomic offset approach to inform potential conservation management for white oak species Quercus rugosa along the Trans-Mexican Volcanic Belt. To identify potential loci involved in local adaptation, they utilized an F_{ST} outlier analysis to show large variations in allele frequency between populations under varying selective pressures. This data were then mapped on a geographic model that showed patterns of adaptive genetic variation and predicted where populations may be at risk.

Results showed a strong east-west genetic gradient following the seasonality of precipitation in the region and suggested that populations in the northeastern region are most likely to be maladapted to future climate conditions. The researchers concluded that management strategies such as AGF could utilize these findings for future conservation efforts.

=== Forestry ===
==== Norway spruce (Picea abies) ====
In 2018, researchers took advantage of a unique situation in southern Sweden where recent gene flow had occurred in populations of Norway spruce (Picea abies) due to a forest breeding program from the mid-twentieth century. Spruce trees were genetically sequenced to identify traits of both adaptive and economic interest. The results suggested a strong pattern of local adaptation and that trees of southern origin grew faster and taller than those of local origin. The researchers concluded that AGF and genomic selection could alleviate climate stress, while also emphasizing the risk of frost damage in AGF of boreal species due to varied timing of tree development and frost period.

== See also ==
- Assisted evolution
- Conservation Genetics
