= Elsa Rehmann =

American architect

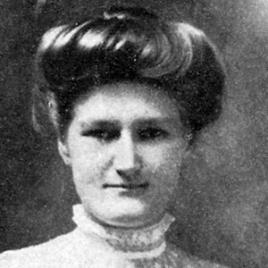
- Elsa Rehmann as a Barnard College student, 1907
- Born: April 11, 1886; Forest Hill, Newark, New Jersey, U.S.
- Died: May 30, 1946 (aged 60); Rockport, Massachusetts
- Occupation: Landscape architect
- Years active: 1911–1929 (?)

Elsa Rehmann (April 11, 1886 – May 30, 1946) was an American landscape architect best known for her pioneering ecological approach to garden design. She and Edith A. Roberts promoted seeking inspiration in plant communities, which Rehmann considered to be the basis for design criteria and translated them into artistic composition.

== Education ==
Elsa Rehmann was born in Forest Hill, Newark, New Jersey, on April 11, 1886. Her parents were German-born architect Carl F. and Marie Rehmann. Elsa may have attended the Public Drawing School; her older sister, Antoinette, was a graduate, and her father was principal of the school from 1882 until his death in 1906.

Rehmann originally intended to become a professional writer, and enrolled in Wells College in 1904. In 1906, she transferred to Barnard College, where she studied medieval architecture and geology in addition to the usual liberal arts. Having graduated from Barnard College in 1908, Rehmann studied at the Lowthorpe School of Landscape Architecture, Gardening, and Horticulture for Women. She left the school in 1911 as probably one of the first eight graduates.

== Gardenesque style ==
In 1911, Rehmann began working as an apprentice in landscape architecture firms. Her first employers were Charles N. Lowrie, who headed the system of parks of Hudson County, and Marian Cruger Coffin, who specialized in stately gardens. While working as an apprentice, Rehmann published magazine articles in the Garden Magazine, Country Life in America, House Beautiful, and Better Homes and Gardens. Her first book, The Small Place: Its Landscape Architecture, published in 1918, illustrated a diversity of residential designs made by contemporary American landscape architects. These publications reflected the common gardenesque ideas of the time.

From 1919, Rehmann had her own practice at her home. Most of her clients were in Essex County but she also designed gardens in other parts of New Jersey, as well as in Delaware, New England, New York, and Pennsylvania. Rehmann's second book, Garden-Making, came out in 1926 and included her own designs, also in the gardenesque style. It was praised both for its scholarly value, poetic prose, and comprehensibility.

== Ecological approach ==
Association with the Botany Department of the Vassar College in the 1920s changed Rehmann's landscape philosophy. She taught landscape gardening there from 1923 to 1924 and landscape architecture from 1925 to 1927. The head of the department was Edith A. Roberts, a pioneer in plant ecology. Roberts was developing an outdoor botanical laboratory for the study of plant communities of the Dutchess County, New York, and their biotopes. Rehmann was asked to interpret the information gathered there from the point of view of an artist, with the intention to show that native plants could be "blended into an attractive landscape picture."

Rehmann and Roberts published a series of articles titled Plant Ecology in House Beautiful in 1927, stating their aim to emphasize the role of plants as an integral part of the landscape and to outline the compositions that they had made. Striving to demonstrate how understanding plant communities could transfer to grounds and gardens, they stressed the role of ecology in naturalistic planting. Their findings were assembled into American Plants for American Gardens, a book published in 1929. Rehmann came to consider plant communities to be the basis for design criteria and translated them into artistic composition. In addition to natural planting compositions, Rehmann also suggested the siting and characteristics of the building. Thus, both her exposure to architecture in childhood and her early inclinations for writing figured prominently in her books. Despite being very well received by reviewers and experts, American Plants for American Gardens never achieved any lasting visibility.

== Later life ==
Elsa Rehmann probably retired from her practice in 1929, when she moved to live with her sister in Rockport, Massachusetts, but may have been involved in the Rockport Summer School of Drawing and Painting. While living in Rockport, Rehmann dedicated her time to writing poetry. A volume called First Poems was published in 1933. The mood of some of her poems suggests personal tragedies, while others reflect an ecological spirit.

Rehmann died in Rockport on May 30, 1946.

== Bibliography ==
- Wurman, Dorothy (2011). Louise A. Mozingo; Linda Jewel (eds.). Women in Landscape Architecture: Essays on History and Practice. USA: McFarland. ISBN 978-0786487332.
