= Assisted evolution =

Assisted evolution (sometimes referred to as human-assisted evolution) is the practice of using human intervention to accelerate the rate of natural evolutionary processes. The goal of assisted evolution is to help species adapt to a changing environment more quickly than they would via natural selection. Assisted evolution can be used to increase food production and crop yield, as well as ensure targeted species to more quickly become resistant to existential threats. Assisted evolution has been practiced for thousands of years, often for commercial and business purposes. Assisted evolution has come into the public eye in recent years for noncommercial purposes such as species conservation. Assisted evolution for noncommercial purposes is most notably practiced in the attempt to save coral reefs from rising global ocean temperatures and other climate change related environmental conditions.

== History ==
=== Commercial purposes ===
Assisted evolution has been practiced for thousands of years for commercial and business purposes. Selective breeding of Asian wolves over 30,000 years ago by hunter-gatherers have allowed for the creation of most modern breeds of domesticated canines, one example being the German Shepherd, often for disability assistance, search-and-rescue, and police and military roles. Plant breeding has also benefited from Rapid Generation Advance (RGA) and single-seed descent to speed up the process of natural selection. Assisted evolution in plants has allowed for increased food production and reduced pesticide use, yielding a decrease in global poverty and malnutrition. Most recently, assisted evolution is being used to breed animals with a higher muscle or fat content, as well as have a higher resistance to harmful bacteria and other pathogens.

=== Non-commercial purposes ===
Assisted evolution for non-commercial purposes was famously used by Gregor Mendel, who discovered the presence of genes and alleles, as well as their impact on an offspring's genotype. Assisted evolution has come into the public eye for noncommercial purposes such as conservation in recent years. Assisted evolution for noncommercial purposes is most notably practiced in the attempt to save coral reefs from rising ocean temperatures. Assisted evolution is believed to be a temporary solution to save many threatened species from global warming and other climate change related environmental changes.

== Types ==
=== Stress conditioning ===
Stress conditioning consists of exposing organisms to sublethal stress, with the goal of inducing physiological changes that increase tolerance to future stress events. There has been documented evidence that some changes can be passed throughout generations in both plants and animals. Stress conditioning can be artificially induced in a laboratory environment to create desired responses based on their environments. Notable examples include a 1989 experiment which used stress conditioning via heat shock on rat kidneys to extend their safe cold storage time to 48 hours. More recently, stress conditioning is being studied as a potential solution for the preservation of coral reefs as they are continually exposed to ocean warming and acidification.

=== Assisted gene flow (AGF) ===
Assisted gene flow (AGF) works to increase the presence of desired naturally occurring genes in offspring. AGF relies on pre-existing genes within the species’ genome, rather than the artificial creation and insertion of genetic code within the genome of the species. Assisted gene flow can also introduce related species’ genomes into the gene pool to allow for the introduction of previously impossible behaviors into the new species. Assisted gene flow identifies genes that produce desired behaviors, and works to increase the chance that parental transmission of the gene in question occurs (also known as heritability). Determining which genes within the genome produce desired behaviors consist of experiments which measure the growth, survival, and behavior exhibition of offspring with varying genotypes. Assisted gene flow is being utilized as a solution to preserve species who are threatened by climate change. Currently, different colonies of the Great Barrier Reef are being interbred to test whether offspring display increased resistance to warmer living conditions. Increased resistance to warmer living conditions allow for the preservation of the Great Barrier Reef even as water temperatures continue to rise.

=== Hybridization ===
Hybridization refers to the process where an egg and sperm from two different species can fertilize and produce young. Hybridization was studied in the 1800s by Johann Gregor Mendel, who posthumously has been credited with the discovery of genes and alleles and their impact on an offspring's genotype. Benefits of hybridization include the increase in genetic diversity and the potential for genetic combinations which are able to adapt to, and reproduce in, increasingly difficult environments. Hybridization of coral reefs during the annual coral spawning is being experimented with to create hybrid offspring that will hopefully have higher survival and growth rates in a variety of climate change related conditions.

Coral naturally forms mutually beneficial symbiosis relationships with algae, allowing them to gain energy. Ocean acidification and rising temperatures cause coral bleaching, the process where the symbiotic relationships breakdown. By modifying the normal algae relationship with algae that usually grows in warmer temperatures, scientists can increase the corals heat tolerance.

See also

- Assisted colonization
- Genetically modified organism
- Genetic engineering techniques
