= Assisted migration =

Intentional transport of species to a different habitat

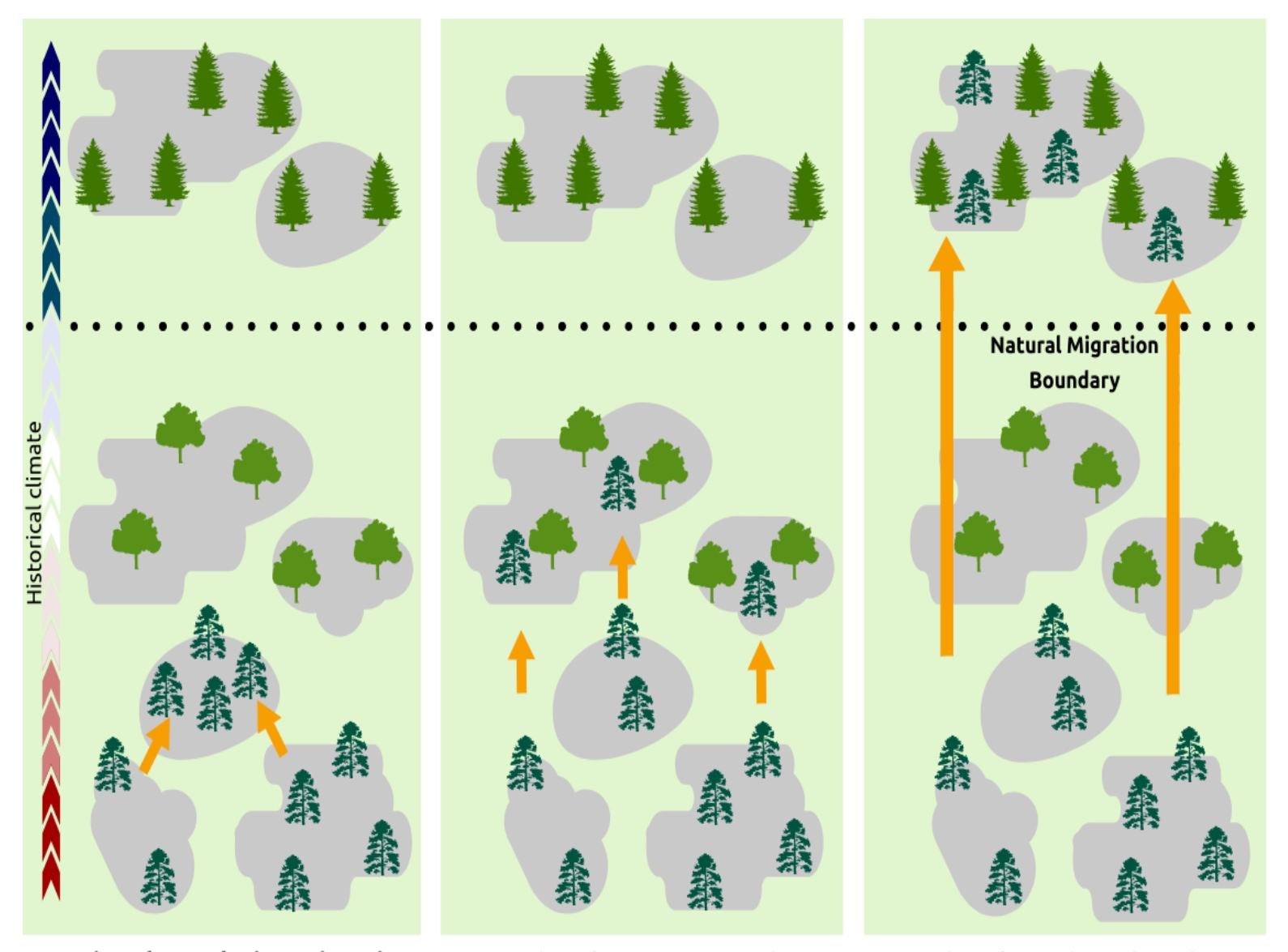
Three types of assisted migration; assisted population migration (left), assisted range migration (center) and assisted species migration (right)

Assisted migration is "the intentional establishment of populations or meta-populations beyond the boundary of a species' historic range for the purpose of tracking suitable habitats through a period of changing climate...." It is therefore a nature conservation tactic by which plants or animals are intentionally moved to geographic locations better suited to their present or future habitat needs and climate tolerances — and to which they are unable to migrate or disperse on their own.

In conservation biology, the term first appeared in publications in 2004. It signified a type of species translocation intended to reduce biodiversity losses owing to climate change. In the context of endangered species management, assisted colonization (2007) and managed relocation (2009) were soon offered as synonyms — the latter in a paper entailing 22 coauthors.

In forestry science and management, assisted migration is discussed in its own journals and from perspectives different from those of conservation biologists. This is, in part, because paleoecologists had already concluded that there were significant lags in northward movement of even the dominant canopy trees in North America during the thousands of years since the final glacial retreat. In the 1990s, forestry researchers had begun applying climate change projections to their own tree species distribution modelling efforts, and some results on the probable distances of future range shifts prompted attention. As well, translocation terminology was not controversial among forestry researchers because migration was the standard term used in paleoecology for natural movements of tree species recorded in the geological record. Another key difference between forestry practices and conservation biology is that the former, necessarily, was guided by "seed transfer guidelines" whenever a timber or pulp harvest was followed up by reforestation plantings. The provincial government of British Columbia in Canada was the first to update their guidelines with, what they call, "climate-based seed transfer."

Overall, debate concerning the ethics of assisted migration in forestry practice was both short-term and muted compared to that which prevails in conservation biology. For this reason, a separate Wikipedia page titled Assisted migration of forests in North America was launched in 2021 and made into a useful teaching tool for climate adaptation education and decision-making in the forestry profession.

The remainder of this page therefore focuses on the topic of assisted migration in conservation biology and especially its applications for management of endangered species.

== Background ==
Climate change is expected to drive many species out of parts of their current ranges while creating new suitable habitats elsewhere. In order to avoid population declines and extinction, many species will need to either adapt or colonize newly suitable areas. Using a niche modeling approach, scientists have predicted that a failure to migrate or adapt will result in about a quarter of the world's species dying out this century under moderate climate change. The natural dispersal rates for many species are far slower than those needed to keep pace with projected habitat shifts in many regions of the world.

Prehistoric climatic changes have resulted in massive global extinctions, and the rate of warming projected for the near future is many times faster than changes in the past 10,000 years. Climate change is increasingly altering geographic ranges where species survive, which can lead to rapid habitat loss and population decline. The inability of some species to naturally keep pace with human-caused climate change has led scientists and land managers to consider assisted migration as a means for preventing extinctions. Trees, amphibians, and corals are projected to disperse too slowly to match climate change already underway. Geographic or human-caused barriers to natural dispersal amplify the problem and thus contributed to the listing as "critically endangered" two small-range endemic species for which assisted migration is now underway: Australia's western swamp tortoise and America's Florida torreya tree. As of 2023, however, there have been few other examples of assisted migration experiments: A review paper concludes, "Assisted migration was most common for plants (particularly trees), followed by birds, and was rarely implemented for other taxa."

=== Assisted migration v. species introduction ===
Assisted migration is a specific type of species introduction. Species introduction is any act of establishing a species in a habitat it does not currently occupy. It often refers to a long-distance relocation, such as the accidental introduction of an invasive species from one continent to another, or the intentional relocation of a species in decline to a habitat where it can persist. By contrast, assisted migration acknowledges that the natural dispersal rate of many species may be too low to naturally respond to rapid human-caused climate change and instead focuses on where the species would be able to disperse fast enough via natural selection to keep pace with the changing environment. Assisted migration practitioners consider helping the species disperse into such sites, which are often immediately adjacent to the species' historical range. In their eyes, assisted migration represents a small artificial boost to an otherwise natural process.

== Controversy ==
While assisted migration has the potential to allow species that have poor natural dispersal abilities to avoid extinction, it has also sparked debate over the possibility that the migrated species might spread diseases or even become too successful (that is, invasive) in the recipient ecosystems. Even so, several assisted migration projects or experiments have begun for several critically endangered species.

Beginning around 2007, opposing pro and con positions became apparent in the field of conservation biology, while still relatively unknown to public promoters of conservation and managers of conservation lands. Supporters generally believe that the expected benefits of assisted migration, including saving and strengthening species, outweigh the potential harm of any project. Detractors generally believe that other conservation techniques which do not include the high risk of invasive species are not only better suited but are also more likely to succeed. This debate continued throughout the literature, generally due to a lack of real-world applications and follow-ups. Though these conservation efforts are becoming increasingly common, few long term looks at their success have been conducted.

In 2022 a review paper by seven researchers in the United States assessed shifts in what they called "conservation strategies for the climate crisis." Among the "novel strategies" surveyed was "climate-adaptive assisted migration." The team found that academic publications became less focused on the pros and cons of the concept through the years. Instead, more attention was given to modeling or mapping where particular species could be moved. While plants had been the focus of most of the early publications, animals took the lead in recent years. Corals, invertebrates, mammals, and birds were the leading types of animals assessed for assisted migration needs and prospects. Even so, "most authors presented assisted species migration as appropriate only for species under exceptionally high threat from climate change." By 2023, a news article in the journal Nature reported, "attitudes towards assisted migration are slowly shifting as conservationists realise just how fast the climate is changing."

A 2023 review paper analyzed 204 species (mostly plants) that had been subject to intentional, experimental, or inadvertent assisted migration. Among their conclusions: "Despite hesitancy around the tactic, humans have a long history of relocating plants and animals for a variety of reasons (e.g., agriculture, horticulture, forestry, pet trade). Further, Indigenous peoples have been translocating species for millennia. As such, it is somewhat surprising that assisted migration for the purpose of conservation has been subject to so much controversy."

=== Invasive species risk ===
Perhaps the principal concern scientists have expressed over assisted migration is the potential for relocated species to be invasive in their new habitats, driving out native species. The fear that assisted migration will facilitate invasions stems mostly from observations of the vast numbers of species that have become invasive outside their native ranges by (often inadvertent) introduction by humans. Although most agree that assisted migration efforts, unlike accidental introductions, should involve detailed planning and risk assessment, for some, any threat of introducing invasive species, no matter how small, disqualifies assisted migration as a viable management response to climate change.

Those who wish to keep assisted migration on the table often note that the vast majority of historical species invasions have resulted from continent-to-continent or continent-to-island transportation of species and that very few invasions have resulted from the comparatively short-distance, within-continent movement of species proposed for assisted migration. For example, Mueller and Hellman reviewed 468 documented species invasions and found that only 14.7% occurred on the same continent where the species originated. Of the 14.7%, the vast majority were fish and crustaceans. Terrestrial species that became invasive on the same continent where they originated were often transported across large biogeographic barriers, such as mountain ranges. These long-distance, within-continent translocations are unlike expected uses of assisted migration, which generally involve helping species colonize habitats immediately adjacent to their current ranges.

=== Uncertainty in the planning process ===
To identify populations at risk and locate new potential habitats, conservationists often use niche models. These models predict the suitability of habitats in the future based on how closely their climates resemble the climate currently inhabited by the species. Though useful for describing broad trends, these models make a number of unrealistic assumptions that restrict the usefulness of their predictions. For instance, they do not consider the possibility that species may be able to develop tolerance of new climates through acclimatization or adaptation. Further, they do not account for the fact that a given species may perform better (e.g., become invasive) or worse (e.g., fail to establish) in a new habitat than in its current range if the community of competitor, predator, and mutualist species is different there. Additionally, because different climate variables (e.g., minimum January temperature, average annual precipitation) rarely shift in unison, it is possible that few areas will exactly match the historical climates of species threatened by climate change. Such multi-directional climate shifts will make it especially difficult to determine the species that are at greatest risk of habitat loss due to climate change and to predict future suitable habitat. The uncertainties in predictions of future suitable habitat limits confidence in assisted migration decisions and has led some to reject assisted migration entirely.

Despite the uncertainty inherent in predictions of future suitable habitat, some studies have demonstrated that predictions can be quite accurate. A study of Hesperia comma butterflies in Britain identified unoccupied habitat sites that were likely to support the species under a warmer climate based on their similarity to occupied sites. As the climate warmed, the butterfly colonized many of the sites; most of the sites it did not colonize were located far from existing populations, suggesting they were uncolonized because the butterfly could not reach them on its own. The data suggested that the suitable, uncolonized sites could be good targets for assisted migration. The results suggested that if investigators can demonstrate their model makes reliable predictions with real-world data, models might be trusted for informing assisted migration decisions.

=== Risks and benefits ===
The science is clear that climate change will drive many species extinct, and a traditional, land-preservation ethic will not prevent extinctions. Those wary of moving species instead suggest expanding networks of habitat corridors, allowing species to naturally migrate into newly suitable areas. Under the rates of climate change projected for the coming decades, however, even perfectly connected habitats will probably be insufficient. Species that cannot naturally keep pace with shifting climates will be at risk regardless of habitat connectivity. Evidence suggests that slowly evolving and slowly dispersing species (including species that are dispersal-limited due to habitat fragmentation) will decline or go extinct in the absence of assisted migration programs.

In their rejection of assisted migration, Ricciardi and Simberloff cite the precautionary principle, stating that any unknown risk, no matter how small, of assisted migration resulting in the creation of new invasive species is enough to require that it not be undertaken. Many scientists reject this position, however, noting that in many cases where extinctions due to climate change are likely, the risks of extinction from not facilitating migration are probably far worse than the risks of facilitating migration. They argue that the precautionary principle cuts both ways, and the risks of inaction must be compared against the risks of action. Others note that the ethics of assisting migration will depend on the values of the stakeholders involved in a specific decision rather than the position of scientists on assisted migration in general. At the very least, some note, scientists should conduct further research into assisted migration and improve our capacity to predict specific outcomes instead of outright rejecting it.

Because confidence in expected outcomes is often greater in the short-term (e.g., 20 years) than the long-term future, it may be more reasonable to use short-term projections to guide actions. However, it is also important to consider whether the climate will remain suitable long enough for colonizing species to mature and reproduce, if that is the management goal.

Due to climate change, accidental species introductions, and other global changes, there is nowhere on the planet free of human disturbance. Thus, the idea that land managers should refrain from creating human-altered communities through assisted migration may be moot given that all communities have been altered by humans to some degree whether managers undertake assisted migration or not. Given the reality of global change, it will be impossible to maintain past ecological communities indefinitely. Many therefore believe we should strive to maintain biodiversity and functioning ecosystems in the face of climate change, even if it means actively moving species beyond their native ranges. In the absence of assisted migration, climate change is already causing many highly mobile species, such as butterflies, to colonize areas they have not previously inhabited. Through assisted migration, managers could help rare or less-mobile species keep pace, possibly preventing future extinctions due to a their inability to colonize new areas fast enough. Though some argue that nature often responds to challenges more effectively in the absence of human intervention, others note that current climate change, itself, is a human intervention. Many species that would have been effective dispersers under slower, natural climate change may be left behind by more mobile species under current rates of human-caused climate change. Thus, through changing the climate, humans may already be artificially segregating species even without actively relocating them.

Critics may also have major concerns about different genetic issues when considering assisted migration such as maladaptation to novel environmental conditions and hybridization with similar species. These often depend on the genetic structure and level of genetic variation in the source populations. The environmental conditions in which these populations are being introduced must also be taken into account. In order to enhance genetic variation, and thus adaptive potential, material could be sourced from multiple populations. This is known as composite provenancing. However, if the environmental gradient is well known, such as predictable changes in elevation or aridity, source populations should be 'genetically matched' to recipient sites as best as possible to ensure that the translocated individuals are not maladapted. This strategy of moving species beyond their current range has been suggested for those that are severely threatened or endangered. By moving them outside their native range, hopefully the immediate threats of predation, disease, and habitat loss can be avoided. However, these species are usually already suffering from some sort of genetic issue resulting from low effective population size such as inbreeding depression, loss in genetic diversity, or maladaptation. Therefore, caution must be taken with what few individuals remain and rapid population growth must be the primary goal. In the case of some species, this can be accomplished with a captive breeding program

=== Alternatives ===
Even under rapid climate change, dispersal into new areas may not be necessary for some species to persist. Instead of tracking climate shifts through space, some species may be able to survive in their present locations by developing tolerance to new conditions through acclimatization and adaptation. The potential for acclimatization or adaptation to allow persistence in the face of climate change varies by species and is generally poorly understood. One study determined that evolution of higher temperature tolerances in some species of amphibians and reptiles will likely occur fast enough to allow these species to survive a 3 °C temperature increase over 100 years, consistent with low- to mid-range projections of global warming. By contrast, many species, such as most temperate trees, have longer generation times and therefore may adapt more slowly; they may take thousands of years to evolve a similar increase in temperature tolerance. Adaptation this slow would be insufficient for keeping up with expected future global warming if migration of new habitats is not an option. In addition to acclimatization and adaption, assisted evolution is an alternative to assisted migration that has been growing in popularity recently due to the worldwide coral reef crisis. Assisted evolution is the practice of using human intervention to accelerate the rate of natural evolutionary processes. There are three main types of assisted evolution.

==== Stress conditioning ====
Stress conditioning consists of exposing organisms to sublethal stress, with the goal of inducing physiological changes that increase tolerance to future stress events. There has been documented evidence that some changes can be passed throughout generations in both plants and animals. Stress conditioning can be artificially induced in a laboratory environment to create desired responses based on their environments. Notable examples include a 1989 experiment which used stress conditioning via heat shock on rat kidneys to extend their safe cold storage time to 48 hours. More recently, stress conditioning is being studied as a potential solution for the preservation of coral reefs as they are continually exposed to ocean warming and acidification.

==== Assisted gene flow ====
Assisted gene flow (AGF) works to increase the presence of desired naturally occurring genes in offspring. AGF relies on pre-existing genes within the species' genome, rather than the artificial creation and insertion of genetic code within the genome of the species. Assisted gene flow can also introduce related species' genomes into the gene pool to allow for the introduction of previously impossible behaviors into the new species. AGF identifies genes that produce desired behaviors or tolerance to environmental conditions, and works to increase the chance that parental transmission of the gene in question occurs (also known as heritability). Determining which genes within the genome produce desired behaviors or environmental tolerance consists of experiments which measure the growth, survival, and behavior exhibition of offspring with varying genotypes. AGF is one possible strategy to preserve species that are threatened by climate change, and can be applied to both plants (e.g. forest restoration) or animal populations. Currently, different coral colonies of the Great Barrier Reef are being interbred to test whether offspring display increased resistance to warmer living conditions. Increased resistance to warmer living conditions allows for the preservation of the Great Barrier Reef even as water temperatures continue to rise.

==== Hybridization ====
Hybridization refers to the process where an egg and sperm from two different species can fertilize and produce young. Hybridization was studied in the 1800s by Johann Gregor Mendel, who posthumously has been credited with the discovery of genes and alleles and their impact on an offspring's genotype. Benefits of hybridization include the increase in genetic diversity and the potential for genetic combinations which are able to adapt to, and reproduce in, increasingly difficult environments. Hybridization of coral reefs during the annual coral spawning is being experimented with to create hybrid offspring that will hopefully have higher survival and growth rates in a variety of climate change related conditions.

In contrast, for neoendemic species, hybridization could result in a loss of biodiversity because closely related species that are offered a chance to interbreed could result in a single species rather than the original two or more. Cupressus abramsiana is such an example. The 2016 federal update of the recovery plan for this threatened cypress tree, endemic to a small geographic region along the California coast, warned of the dangers of hybridization. A section of the plan titled "Genetic introgression" (also known as introgressive hybridization) explains how the integrity of this species is threatened by nearby horticultural plantings of a sister species, Monterey cypress, whose historically native range is nearby: on the opposite side of Monterey Bay. Hybridization is known to occur between the two endemics — as well as with a widely planted sister species native to Arizona: Arizona cypress. Other consequences of hybridization include the accumulation of deleterious genes, outbreeding depression, and genetic swamping. In the case of outbreeding depression which reduces the fitness of the hybrid species, there is a risk of extinction. This occurs when the population growth rate is below the replacement rate, wasting the reproductive potential of two populations.

== Governmental policies ==
=== Global conservation policy ===
A review paper published in the journal Science in 1989, titled "Translocation as a Species Conservation Tool: Status and Strategy," compiled the use of translocations for rare species (of birds and mammals) from 1973 to 1989 in the United States, Hawaii, Canada, Australia, and New Zealand. Habitat destruction, habitat fragmentation, and hunting were the primary causes of decline listed in that paper. Climate change was not mentioned as a cause for concern.

Three decades later, the International Union for the Conservation of Nature (IUCN) published that "climate change currently affects at least 10,967 species on the IUCN Red List of Threatened Species." In another IUCN publication in 2021, climate change was mentioned 20 times in a 355-page report by the organization's Conservation Translocation Specialist Group; but "assisted colonization" as an adaptive response was mentioned just once.

In 2022, the update of the United Nations Convention on Biological Diversity agreement recognized "climate change" as the third most significant threat to global biodiversity. "Changes in land and sea use" along with "direct exploitation of organisms" were regarded as greater threats. Because the agreement was at the level of "goals" and "targets," no mention was made of conservation tools, such as translocation, nor its climate-adaptive form (assisted migration).

=== USA Endangered Species Act ===
Although the Endangered Species Act of 1973 did not in itself restrict assisted migration, a regulatory change in 1984 regarding "experimental populations" made prospective translocations more difficult to justify. June 2022, the U.S. Fish and Wildlife Service published a proposed rule in the Federal Register that would "revise section 10(j) regulations under the Endangered Species Act to better facilitate recovery by allowing for the introduction of listed species to suitable habitats outside of their historical ranges. The proposed change will help improve the conservation and recovery of imperiled ESA-listed species in the coming decades, as growing impacts from climate change and invasive species cause habitats within their historical ranges to shift and become unsuitable." The comment period ended August 2022, with more than 500 comments posted online by supporters and opponents. The final decision is scheduled for publication June 2023. A 2010 paper in Conservation Letters had pointed out that, while no statutory changes appeared necessary to facilitate this newly proposed form of climate adaptation, "current regulations are an impediment to assisted colonization for many endangered animal species, whereas regulations do not necessarily restrict assisted colonization of endangered plants."

The U.S. Department of Interior in June 2023 announced its decision to modify the section 10(j) rule by deleting reference to "historical range" as a parameter for where "experimental populations" were authorized to be located. This effectively authorized assisted species migration for endangered or threatened plants and animals. The press release summarized the reason for the change as, "At the time the original 10(j) regulations were established, the potential impact of climate change on species and their habitats was not fully realized, yet in the decades since have become even more dramatic. These revisions will help prevent extinctions and support the recovery of imperiled species by allowing the Service and our partners to implement proactive, conservation-based species introductions to reduce the impacts of climate change and other threats such as invasive species."

== Implementation ==
A number of scholarly reports have documented natural poleward range shifts of mobile species — notably, butterflies and birds, during the past several decades of global warming. This is especially the case in the United Kingdom, where natural history observations are reputable and reach back several centuries. It has also been documented that plants are being sold in nurseries in Europe far north of their historically native ranges, and with apparent success in the colder habitats. Evidence of such "inadvertent assisted migration", owing to the horticultural trade, has also been documented for plants in the United States.

In the North American context, assisted migration is most often discussed in the context of the relocalization of the continent's forests. In the late 2000s and early 2010s, the Canadian provinces of Alberta and British Columbia modified their tree reseeding guidelines to account for the northward movement of forest's optimal ranges. British Columbia even gave the green light for the relocation of a single species, the Western Larch, 1000 km northward.

In the series below of actual and prospective assisted migration projects, all but one (Florida torreya tree) are being advocated and implemented by professional scientists, and usually with oversight by governmental endangered species programs. Taxonomic significance in successfully translocating plant and animal species range from (a) maintaining the genetics of an isolated population (American pika), to (b) preventing extinction of a subspecies (Quino checkerspot butterfly), to (c) preventing the extinction of a species (Florida torreya tree), and to (d) preventing extinction of a genus (Western swamp tortoise).

=== First projects ===
==== Florida torreya, US ====
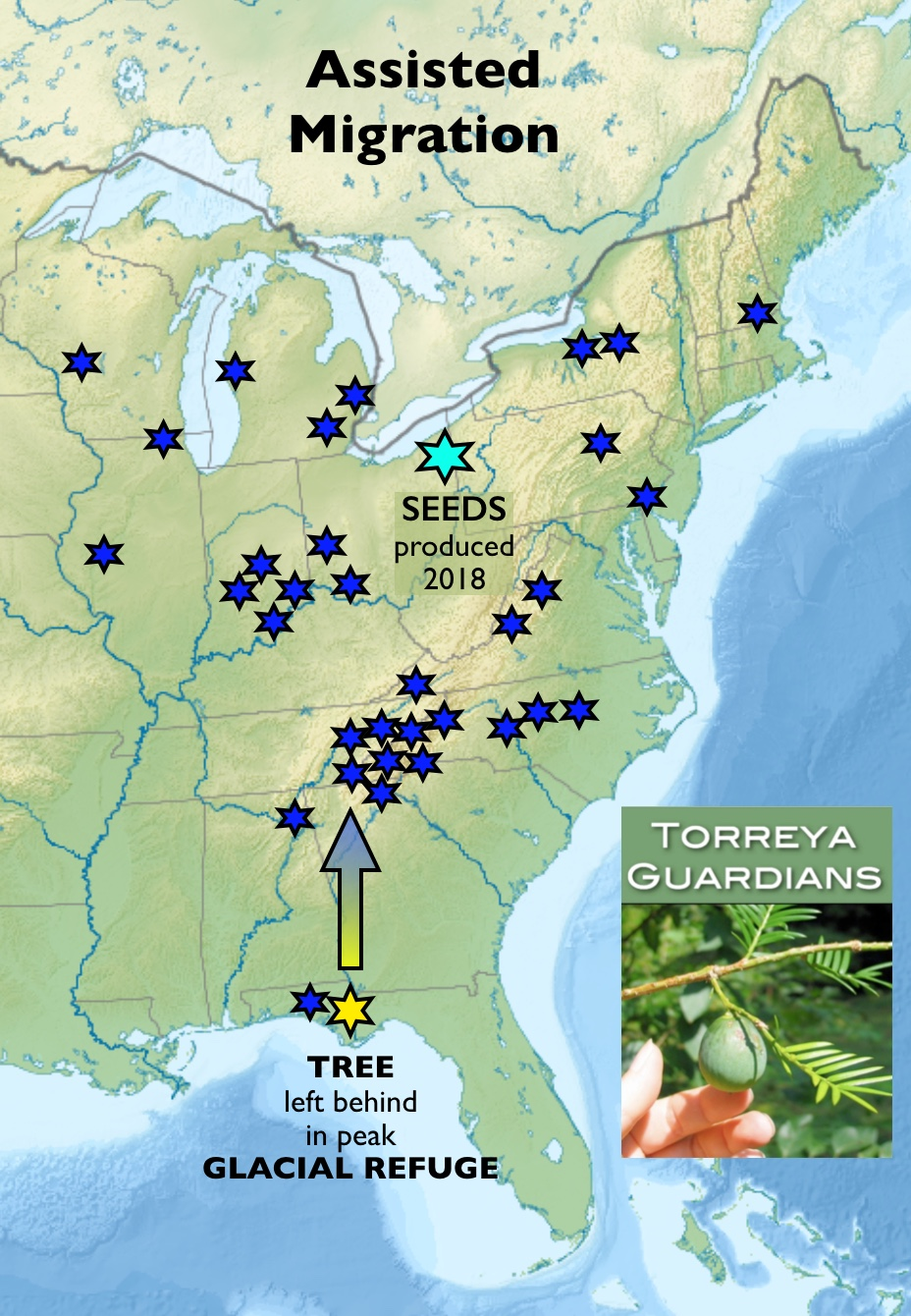
Dark blue stars indicate sites where the Torreya Guardians have sent donated seeds since their formation in 2005. The turquoise star is where seed production began in 2018.

The Florida torreya (Torreya taxifolia) is a critically endangered tree of the yew family, Taxaceae, found in the Southeastern United States, at the state border region of northern Florida and southwestern Georgia. A self-organized group of conservationists called the Torreya Guardians was created in 2004 to undertake the assisted migration of this glacial relict tree by rewilding it in more northern parts of the United States. The controversy that developed was that the citizens used an exception (just for plants) in the United States Endangered Species Act of 1973 to begin their own assisted migration of a listed critically endangered species — even while the official recovery plan did not yet allow for it.

By 2018 the citizens had accomplished documentation of species thrival in a dozen legacy horticultural plantings — including seed production and next-generation saplings at several sites in North Carolina. In 2018 their own plantings in Cleveland, Ohio, began producing seeds (turquoise star in image at right).

Early scholarly debates on the pros and cons of assisted migration as a climate-adaptation tool for endangered species conservation often mentioned the Florida torreya project., as did international media

==== Western Swamp Tortoise, Australia ====
The western swamp tortoise (Pseudemydura umbrina) is a critically endangered reptile that is endemic to a small portion of southwestern Australia. It was deemed extinct until it was rediscovered in 1954 and reported in 1981 to be "a relict species of a monotypic genus, of very restricted range and specialized habitat." This species is notable in conservation history for being the first example of an endangered vertebrate that was experimentally translocated to a distant location (300 kilometers poleward) expressly because of climate change.

By the time assisted migration trials began, the sole remaining original refuge for this species was inhabited only by captive-bred tortoises that had been reintroduced. The first trial began in 2016, with the release of 24 captive-raised juveniles. In contrast to the Florida torreya tree example, this first experiment in assisted migration of an endangered species in Australia was "preceded by detailed planning and research." A generally positive result, despite impediments to statistically significant data, was reported in a journal article four years later.

A second trial began in 2022 in the same region, this time in Scott National Park. Lead scientist is Nicola Mitchell, an associate professor of conservation physiology at the University of Western Australia. She openly spoke to the International New York Times about the ethical imperative: Should humans just let nature run its course, thereby dooming this species to extinction because of climate change? "Or do we have an ethical responsibility" to act in its behalf?

Mark Schwartz, a conservation scientist at the University of California, Davis, was quoted in the article. Speaking about the scale of biodiversity threats posed by climate change, versus using assisted migration as an adaptive strategy, Schwartz said: "To move enough species to resolve this threat basically seems untenable." Yet he also noted that climate-responsive translocations were more acceptable than another approach under consideration: initiating gene editing to make species more climate-proof. Lead scientist Mitchell acknowledged the risks, while offering "we can potentially undo our mistakes by recapturing them." Additional translocations of baby turtles continued into 2023.

=== Early advocacy without implementation ===
==== Quino Checkerspot butterfly, US ====
The Quino checkerspot (Euphydryas editha quino) is a butterfly native to southern California and northwestern Baja California. It is a subspecies of the common Edith's checkerspot (Euphydryas editha), which ranges as far north as southern British Columbia and Alberta. In 1997 it became the second subspecies of Edith's checkerspot to be listed under the federal Endangered Species Act. (The first was Bay checkerspot, which was listed as "threatened" in 1987.)

Notably, it became the first endangered species for which climate change was reported as a current threat and thus a factor to be considered in its recovery plan. However, as reported in The Guardian April 2014

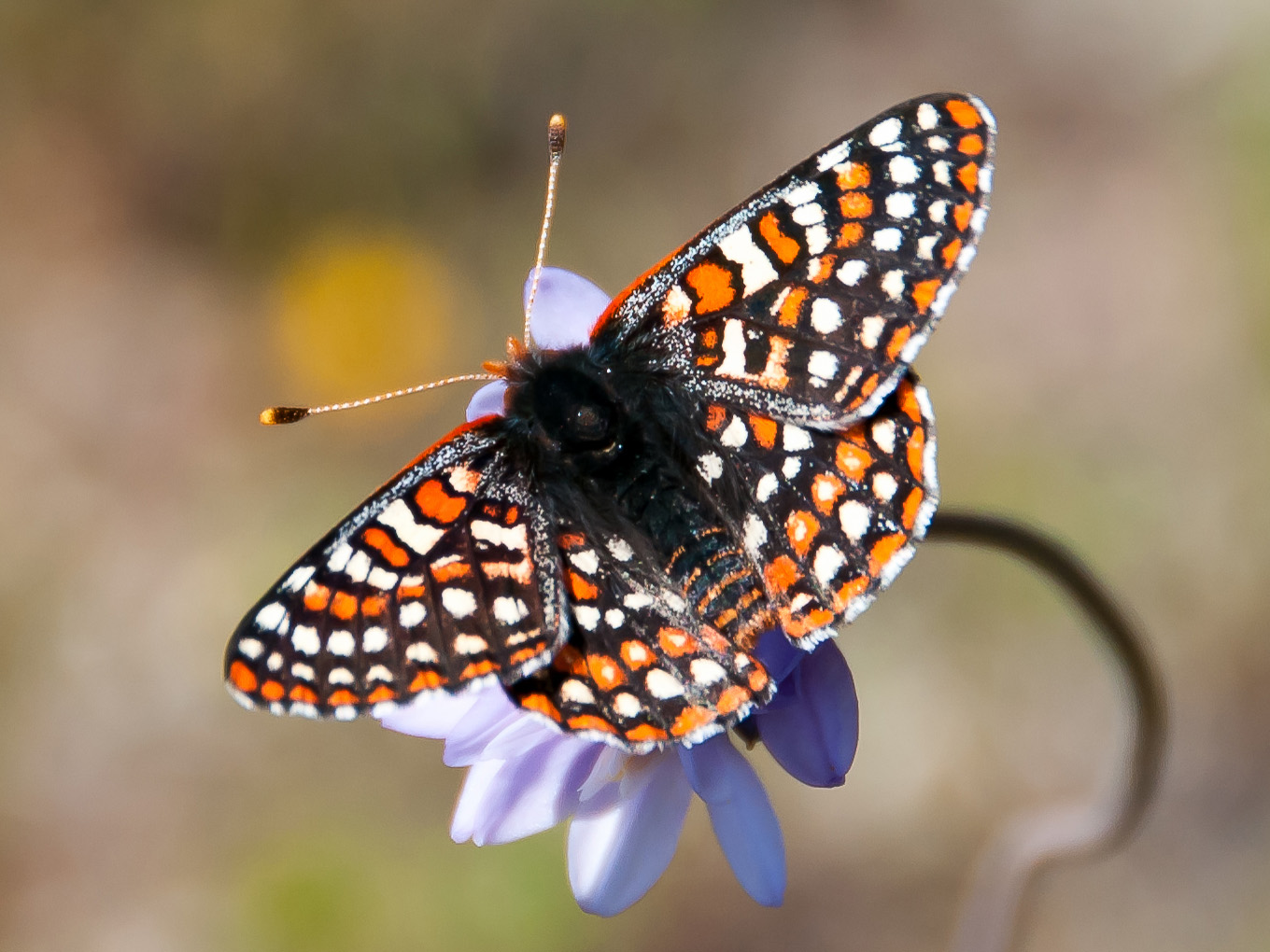
Quino Checkerspot Butterfly on a wild hyacinth

A butterfly species whose population collapsed because of climate change and habitat loss has defied predictions of extinction to rapidly move to cooler climes and change its food plant. The quino checkerspot (Euphydryas editha quino), found in Mexico and California, has shifted to higher altitudes and surprisingly chosen a completely different species of plant on which to lay its eggs, according to research presented at the Butterfly Conservation's seventh international symposium in Southampton.... "Every butterfly biologist who knew anything about the quino in the mid-1990s thought it would be extinct by now, including me," said Prof Camille Parmesan of the Marine Sciences Institute at Plymouth University...."

In a paper titled, "Endangered Quino checkerspot butterfly and climate change: Short-term success but long-term vulnerability?", the authors acknowledged the butterfly's surprising ability to utilize a new larval plant food in a cooler nearby habitat and concluded: "Quino appears resilient to warming climate. However, projections indicate that most or all of Quino's current range in the USA, including the new high elevation expansion, will become uninhabitable. Our most frequent projected future range (circa 2050) is c. 400 km northward from current populations, hence conservation of Quino may eventually require assisted colonization."

==== American Pika (rodent) and Joshua Tree, US ====
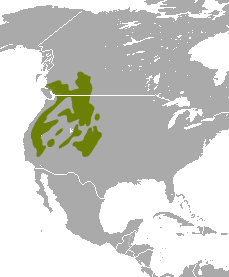
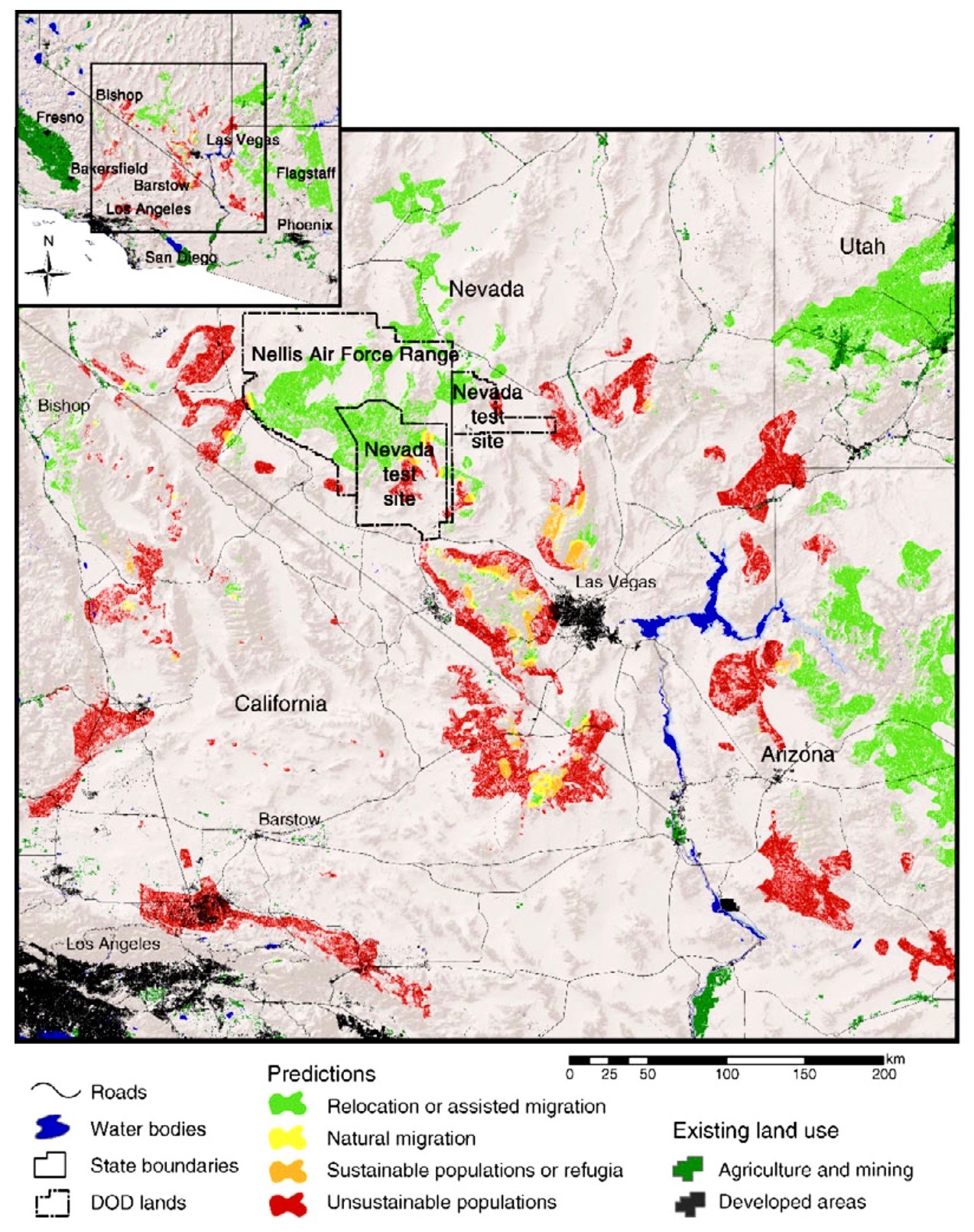
LEFT: Current native range of American pika. RIGHT: Modelled range contraction (red) and expansion (green) for Joshua Tree in future climate warming.

Within the first decade of the terms assisted migration and assisted colonization appearing in the journals of conservation biology science, two wide-ranging species in the western USA (image right) were scrutinized for possible application of the new climate adaptation tool. The American pika, Ochotona princeps, (a close relative of rabbits) and the Joshua tree, Yucca brevifolia, (the iconic tree of the Mojave Desert) were experiencing climate-driven range contractions in their southernmost populations.

At the time, when climate-adaptation tools were originally discussed, scientific applications to well-known species garnered media attention. Because successfully capturing, transporting, and releasing an alpine mammal would require planning and "considerable financial resources," serious advocacy for launching such a project for the pika did not occur. As for Joshua tree, in 2019 the U.S. Fish and Wildlife Service ruled against listing this desert plant as a "threatened" species, and California state government did the same in 2022. During this time, three U.S. Fish & Wildlife Service scientists aggregated existing research (including range shift climate modelling) into a report titled, "Examining the Past, Present, and Future of an Iconic Mojave Desert Species, the Joshua Tree." It was published in December 2020. No mention was made of any form of translocation, including assisted migration, for securing the species against future climate change.

==== Stitchbird (hihi), New Zealand ====
The stitchbird, also known as the Hihi, is a bird endemic to New Zealand. Changes in climate have shown to have a profound effect on the hihi's ability to thrive and reproduce. As a result, human caused climate change is an existential threat to the species. The hihi's current native habitat is becoming unstable due to rising temperatures, and suitable temperatures are shifting further south. Assisted migration is being considered as a means of ensuring the hihi can remain in its current natural habitat. Critics, however, argue the risks that are presented to the new host environments are not worth the potential benefits assisted migration may present.

=== Coupled plant and animal project underway ===
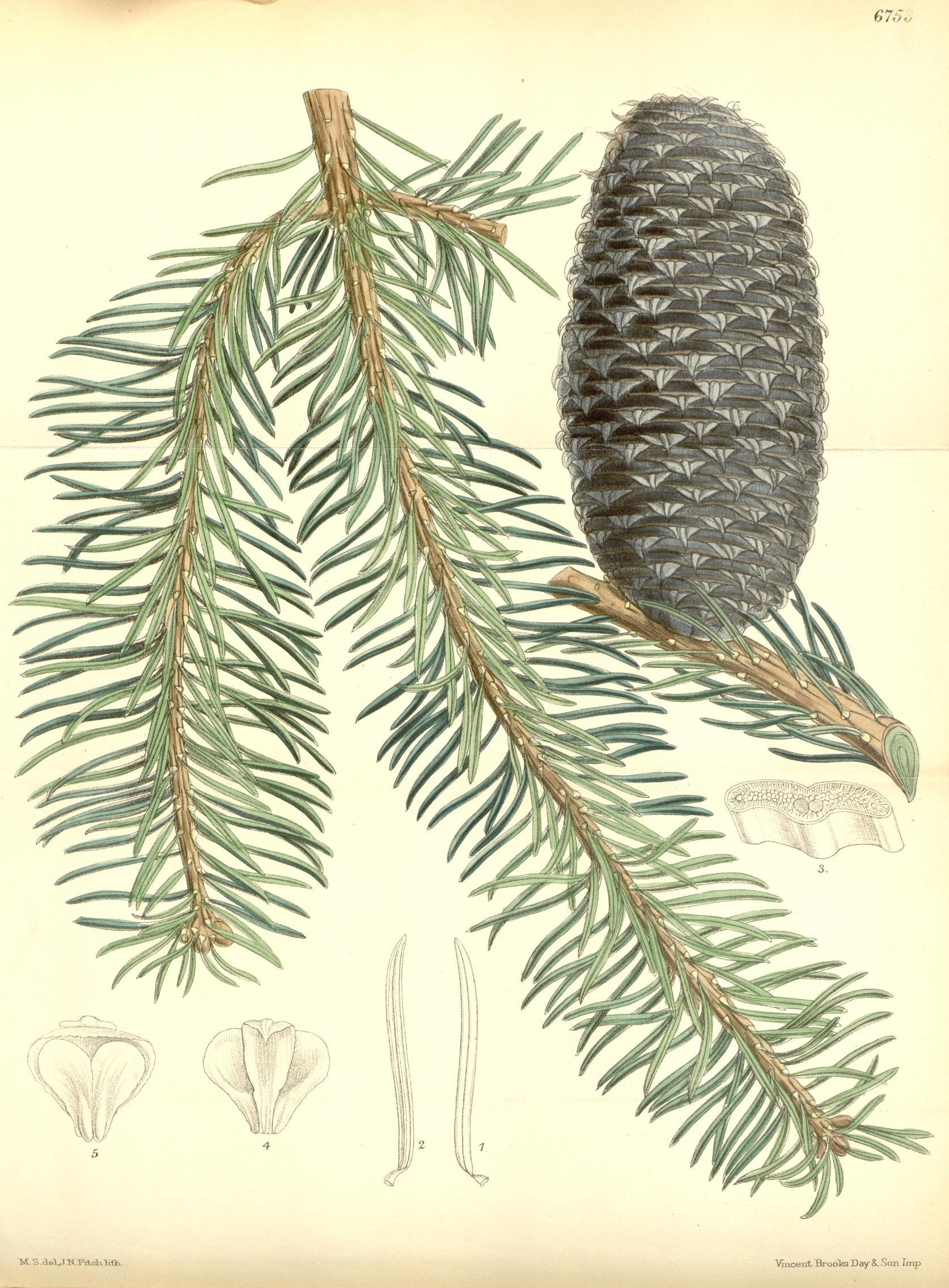
Abies religiosa - Curtis's Botanical Magazine, Vol. 110

In 2024, positive results of a successful combined assisted migration project were reported in the volcanic region near Mexico City. A native, high-altitude tree favored by North America's overwintering population of Monarch butterfly had been test planted on an extinct volcano that offered higher altitudes for trees to grow than the existing monarch sanctuary 75 kilometers away. Thirteen scientists coauthored a paper titled, "Establishing monarch butterfly overwintering sites for future climates: Abies religiosa upper altitudinal limit expansion by assisted migration." They wrote, "We conclude that the establishment of A. religiosa at 3,600 and 3,800 meters is feasible and that planted stands could eventually serve as overwintering sites for the Monarch butterfly under projected future climates."

Establishing a slow-growing tree to serve as a mature forest sanctuary by century's end for a migratory insect is a second-level complication beyond the single-species projects that are still considered controversial. Additionally, the team first had to establish at the higher experimental elevations a native shrub, Baccharis conferta, to serve as nurse plants protecting the newly planted fir seedlings from frost and drought during their early years.

The lead author recounted important sightings of the butterfly near the tree translocation site: "Monarch butterflies have over recent years established new and large colonies at colder places within the Nevado de Toluca, which suggests that they already are searching for new places to overwinter. Once our seedlings are fully grown, they will hopefully discover our planting site, too." This site was chosen because it offers mountain slopes more than a thousand meters higher than the existing butterfly preserve.

== Inadvertent assisted migration ==
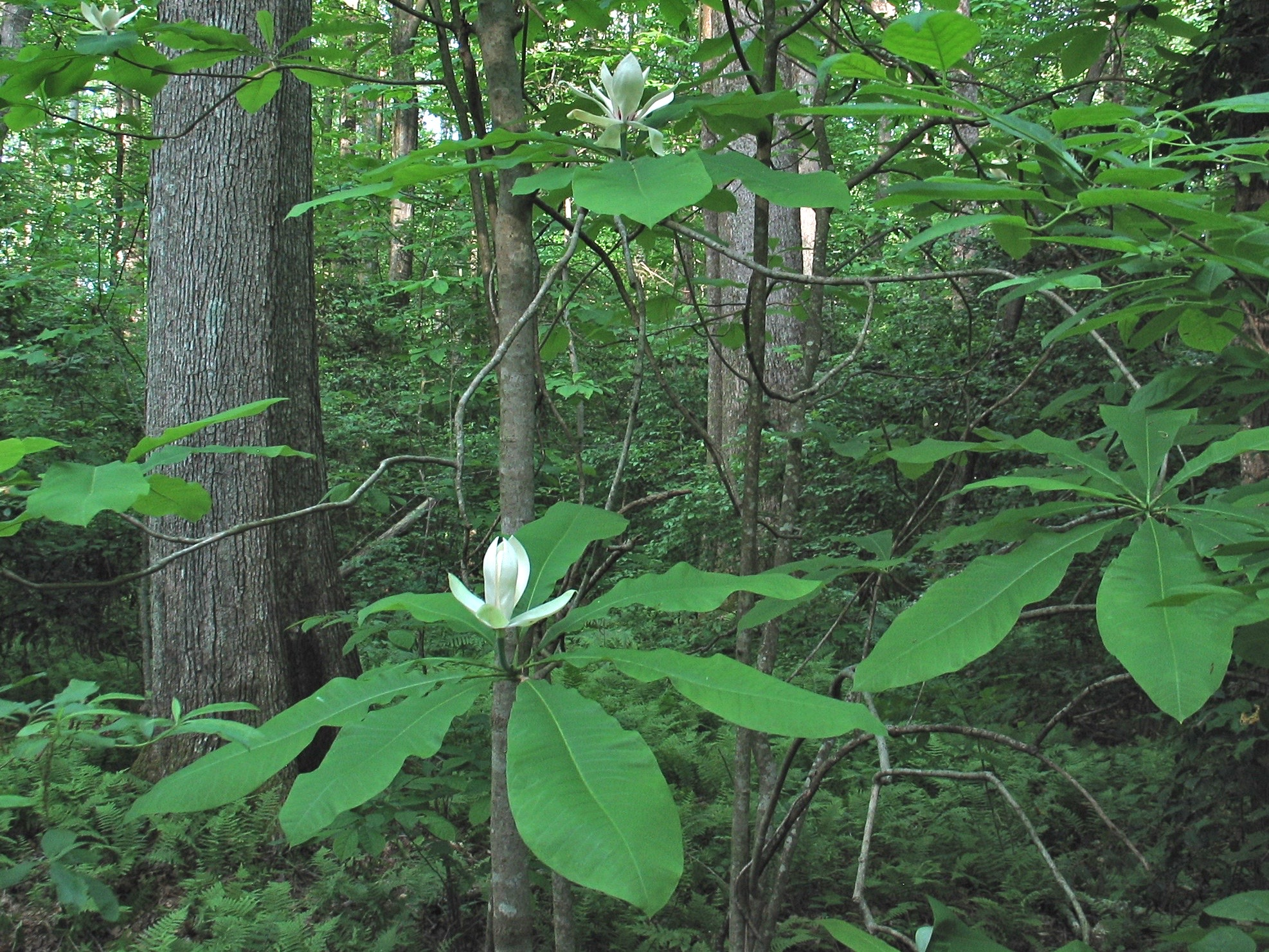
Umbrella magnolia, a subcanopy tree, in flower northeast Alabama

Mature horticultural plantings of trees northward of their native ranges are a form of assisted migration already underway. Because the original plantings likely did not include the goal of helping the trees migrate northward in a warming climate, this form of unintended climate adaptation enabled by humans can be called inadvertent assisted migration. Jesse Bellemare and colleagues may have coined the term in a paper published in 2017: "It appears that a subset of native plants, particularly those with ornamental value, might already have had opportunities to shift their ranges northward via inadvertent human assistance." A subcanopy tree native to the southeastern United States, umbrella magnolia, that had fully naturalized into a forest adjacent to its original horticultural planting in Massachusetts was the subject of an earlier paper by Bellemare. This and other examples suggest not only that poleward assisted migration of plants can be successful, but that distinguishing native from non-native species in this time of rapid climate change will require novel standards.

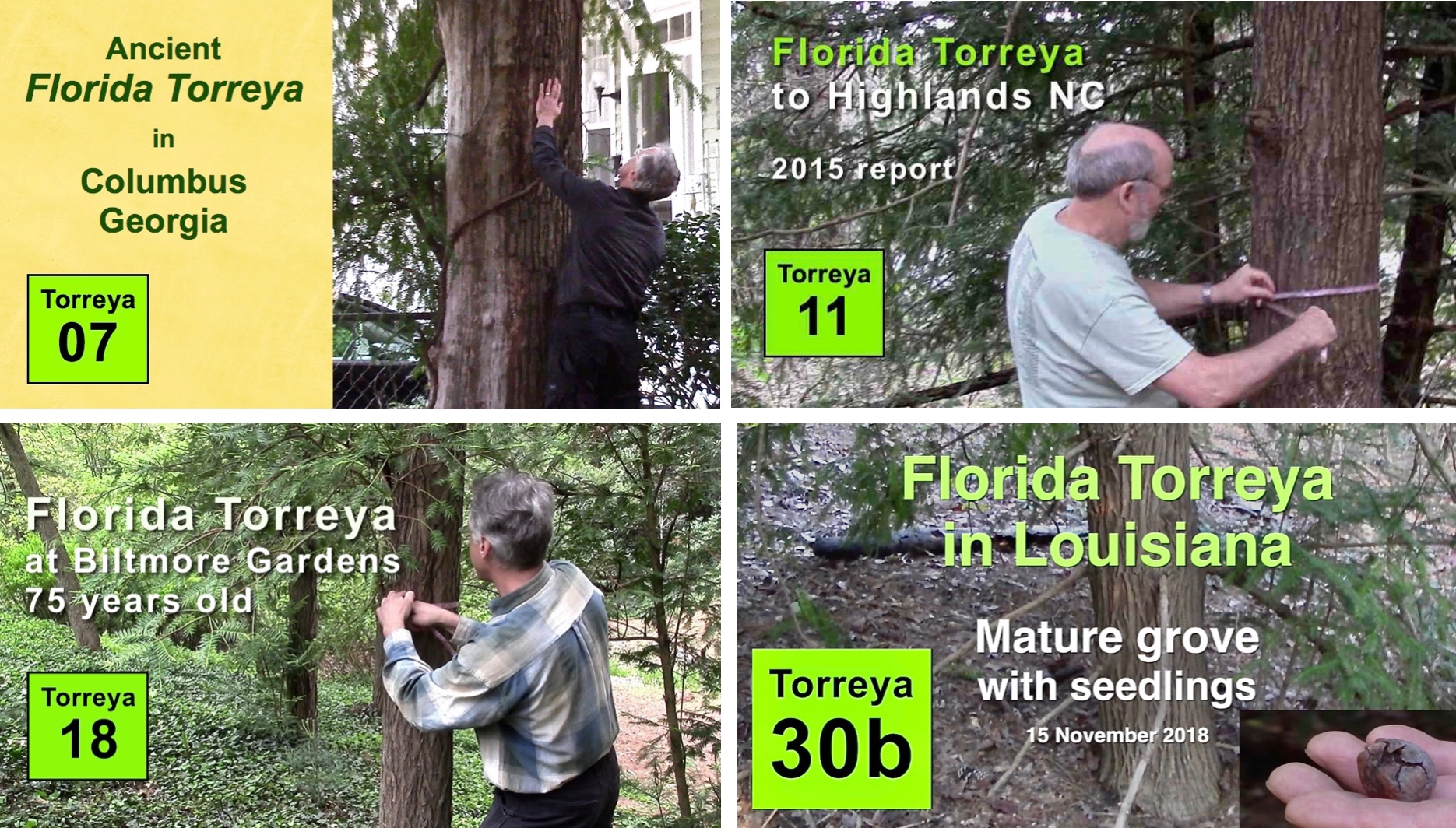
Historic groves of Torreya taxifolia planted outside of native range have been documented by Torreya Guardians and posted as photo-essays on the group's website and also as videos.

Reports of full naturalization of poleward horticultural plantings of other native trees have been used as support for intentional deployment of assisted migration at larger scales as a tool for climate adaptation. Coast redwood (native to California) and Torreya taxifolia (native to Florida) are two examples. In 2022 a Canadian Forestry Service publication pointed to the success of horticultural plantings in British Columbia and Washington state, along with a review of research detailing redwood's paleobiogeography and current range conditions, as grounds for proposing that Canada's Vancouver Island already offered "narrow strips of optimal habitat" for extending the range of coast redwood. As to Florida torreya, documentation of "historic groves in northward states" was presented by the group Torreya Guardians as a supportive factor in their 2019 "Petition to Downlist from endangered to threatened Torreya taxifolia". Two years later, a decision was issued and published, with no change in species status of imperilment. But Factor E of the decision, "Documentation of Historical Groves," did acknowledge the citizen accomplishments in this regard.

== See also ==
- Climate change adaptation
- Forest management
- Effect of climate change on plant biodiversity
- Hemerochory
- Escaped plant
