= Edith A. Roberts =

American botanist

- Roberts as professor at Vassar College
- Born: April 28, 1881; Rollinsford, New Hampshire
- Died: March 1977 aged 95
- Education: Smith College, University of Chicago
- Known for: Creating the first ecological laboratory in the United States
- Scientific career
- Fields: Botany, physiology
- Workplaces: Mount Holyoke College, United States Department of Agriculture, Vassar College, Massachusetts Institute of Technology

Edith Adelaide Roberts (1881–1977) was an American botanist studying plant physiology and a pioneer in plant ecology. She created the first ecological laboratory in the United States, promoted natural landscaping along with Elsa Rehmann, and proved that plants were the main source of vitamin A.

== Education and academic career ==
Edith A. Roberts was born on April 28, 1881, into a farmer's family in Rollinsford, New Hampshire. Roberts earned her Bachelor of Arts degree at Smith College in 1905, followed by a Master of Science degree at the University of Chicago in 1911. Her doctoral thesis, submitted at the University of Chicago, was in plant physiology.

Roberts worked as instructor to an associate professor at Mount Holyoke College from 1915 to 1917, when she was employed by the United States Department of Agriculture as an extension worker. She traveled throughout all 48 states on a mission to educate women on managing farms in place of men who were fighting in World War I. In an interview, she said that "all women [who are] going to run a family should have plant science. It is basic to living." Roberts worked for the USDA until 1919, when she was offered the position of associate professor of botany at Vassar College. By 1921, she was a full professor and chairman of the Plant Science Department. Roberts was recognized by her colleagues for her research in plant physiology, native plant propagation, and seed germination. She belonged to the Botanical Society of America, the American Forestry Association, and the American Association for the Advancement of Science.

== Plant ecology ==
Roberts was a pioneer in the newly emerging science of plant ecology. In 1920, Vassar College granted four acres of land for the realization of her idea of an outdoor botanical laboratory. Situated in the Dutchess County, this was the first ecological laboratory in the United States. Roberts strove to arrange the plants in correct associations and with proper environmental conditions. As the project did not receive enough funds from the college, Roberts had to partly finance it herself by giving outside lectures. The number of native species grown in the laboratory eventually reached 2,000.

Landscape architect Elsa Rehmann, also employed by Vassar College, interpreted the results of Roberts' research in the context of garden design. They published their findings first in articles for the magazine House Beautiful and then in a 1929 book titled American Plants for American Gardens, becoming early advocates of natural landscaping. In 1935, Roberts published American Ferns: How to Know, Grow and Use Them.

== Plant physiology ==
Roberts retired from Vassar College in 1948, and became guest scientist at the Massachusetts Institute of Technology. At MIT, Roberts consulted its department of food technology, researching plants as vitamin sources. In 1948, she presented a paper, coauthored with Mildred Southwick, proving that vitamin A could be obtained from young green and yellow plant parts and not mainly from fish liver oils.

== Legacy ==
After Roberts' retirement, the Dutchess County Outdoor Ecological Laboratory was maintained for a few more years but soon fell into neglect. By the 1960s, it was abandoned, and her books have gone out of print. She died in March 1977. The remnants of the laboratory were unexpectedly discovered by biologist Margaret Ronsheim, also a professor at Vassar College, in the 1990s. The laboratory is now under reconstruction.

== Bibliography ==
- Foderaro, Lisa W. (July 25, 2013). "Vassar Revives Garden Nurtured by Early Promoter of Native Plants". The New York Times.
- Ringel, Lance (2012). "Edith Roberts: A Haven for Native Plants". Vassar – The Alumnae/i Quarterly. Vol. 108.
- Wayne, Tiffany K. (2011). American Women of Science Since 1900. Vol. 1. ABC-CLIO. pp. 806–807. ISBN 978-1598841589.
- Wurman, Dorothy (2011). Louise A. Mozingo; Linda Jewel (eds.). Women in Landscape Architecture: Essays on History and Practice. McFarland. ISBN 978-0786487332.
