= Torreya (disambiguation) =

Torreya is a genus of conifers in the family Taxaceae.

Torreya may also refer to:

- Torreya State Park, Florida
- Torreya grandiflora, a synonym of the flowering plant Synandra
- Torreya, a synonym of the flowering plant Croomia
- Torreya, a journal of the Torrey Botanical Society
