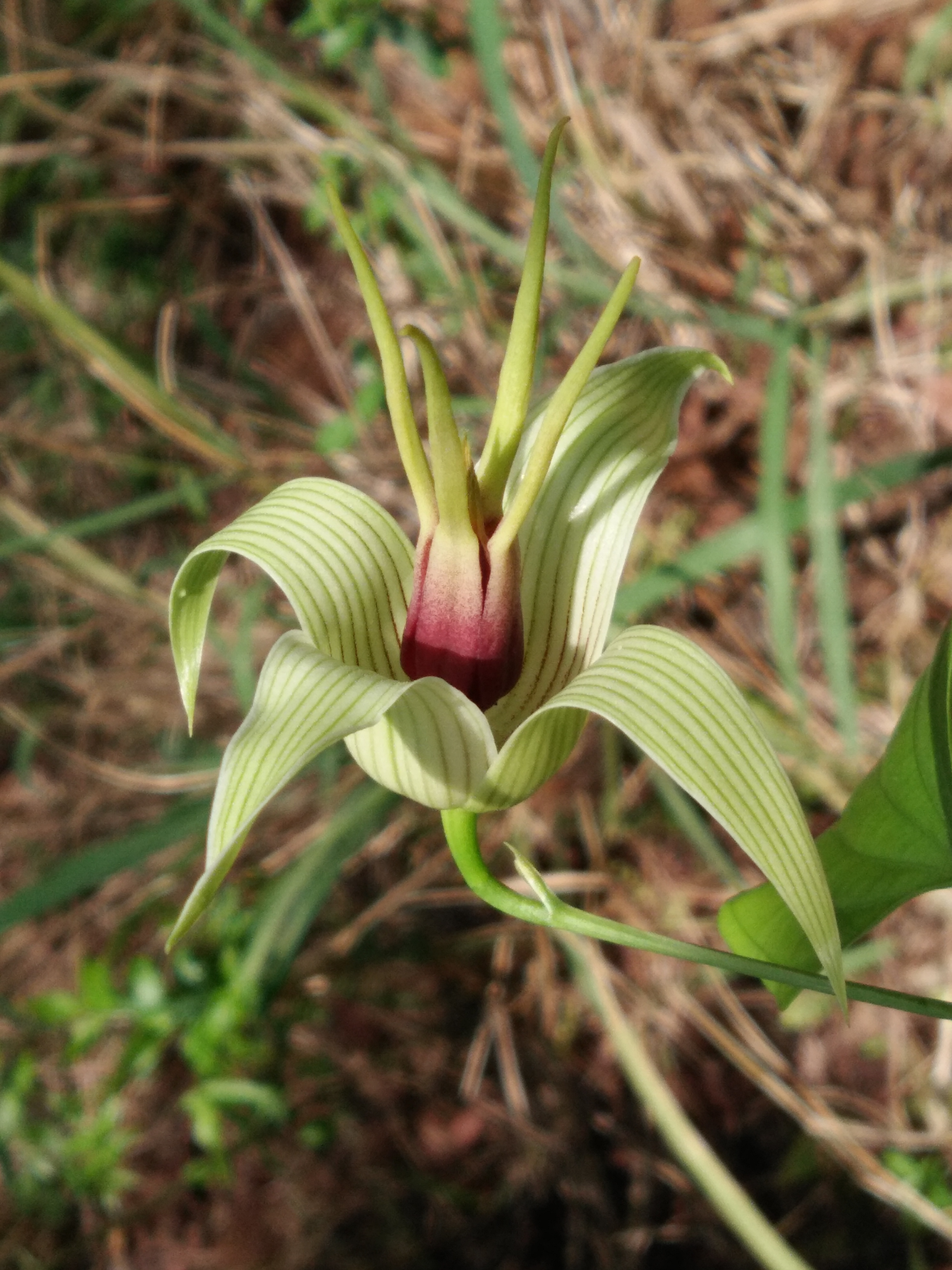

Scientific classification
- Kingdom: Plantae
- Clade: Tracheophytes
- Clade: Angiosperms
- Clade: Monocots
- Order: Pandanales
- Family: Stemonaceae
- Genus: Stemona
- Species: S. tuberosa

Binomial name
- Stemona tuberosa Lour.

= Stemona tuberosa =

Species of flowering plant

Stemona tuberosa is a species of flowering plant in the family Stemonaceae. Hornets play an important role in seed dispersal by biting off the seed with its elaiosome and then carrying the seed away for about 100 m. There they chew off the elaiosome and abandon the seed which is likely to be taken by ants into their nest.

== Genomics ==
The first haplotype-resolved telomere-to-telomere genome assemblies of Stemona tuberosa, providing the first reference genomes for the species, were published in 2026. The two haplotype assemblies are approximately 803 Mb and 795 Mb in size and comprise seven pseudochromosomes each. The assemblies exceed 96% BUSCO completeness and contain 25,561 and 25,854 predicted protein-coding genes, respectively.

== Distribution ==
It is native to Assam, Bangladesh, Cambodia, South-Central and Southeast China, Hainan, India, Laos, the Lesser Sunda Islands, the Maluku Islands, Myanmar, New Guinea, the Philippines, Sri Lanka, Taiwan, Thailand, and Vietnam.

== Traditional medicine ==
Stemona tuberosa (Chinese: 百部; pinyin: bǎi bù) is one of the 50 fundamental herbs used in traditional Chinese medicine. It can be used as a treatment for Pediculus capitus and Phthirus pubis typically with low skin irritation.

== Varieties ==
accepted varieties

1. Stemona tuberosa var. minor (Hook.f.) C.E.C.Fisch. - India
2. Stemona tuberosa var. moluccana (Blume) ined. - New Guinea, Maluku, Philippines, Lesser Sunda Islands
3. Stemona tuberosa var. tuberosa - China, India, Bangladesh, Indochina, Maluku, Philippines, Lesser Sunda Islands

== See also ==
- Chinese herbology 50 fundamental herbs
