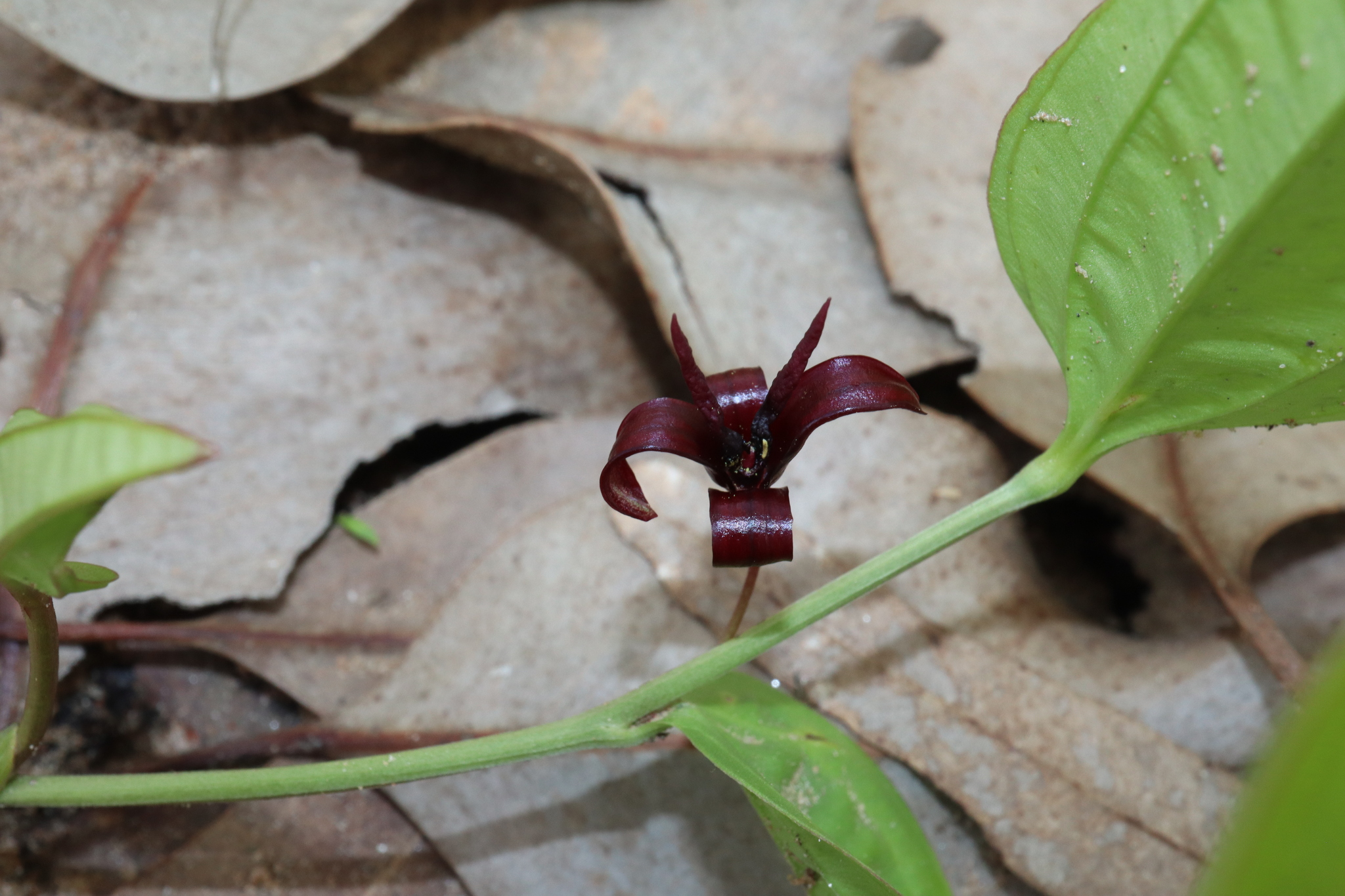

Scientific classification
- Kingdom: Plantae
- Clade: Embryophytes
- Clade: Tracheophytes
- Clade: Spermatophytes
- Clade: Angiosperms
- Clade: Monocots
- Order: Pandanales
- Family: Stemonaceae
- Genus: Stemona
- Species: S. australiana

Binomial name
- Stemona australiana (Benth.) C.H.Wright

Synonyms
- Roxburghia javanica var. australiana Benth.; Stemona versteegii Schltr.

= Stemona australiana =

Species of plant

Stemona australiana is a species of plant native to tropical south-east Asia, including northern Australia and Papua New Guinea. It grows as a herb or climber up to two metres high.

It was first published by George Bentham in 1878 under the name Roxburghia javanica var. australiana, indicating that it was considered a variety of the plant now known as Stemona javanica. In 1896 Charles Henry Wright transferred it into Stemona, a name for the genus which had priority over Roxburghia, at the same time promoting it to species rank as Stemona australiana.
