= Croomia japonica =

Scientific classification
- Kingdom: Plantae
- Clade: Tracheophytes
- Clade: Angiosperms
- Clade: Monocots
- Order: Pandanales
- Family: Stemonaceae
- Genus: Croomia
- Species: C. japonica

Binomial name
- Croomia japonica (Nutt.) Torr.

Synonyms
- Croomia kiusiana Makino

Species of flowering plant

Croomia japonica is a plant species native to China and Japan. It grows in mixed forests.
