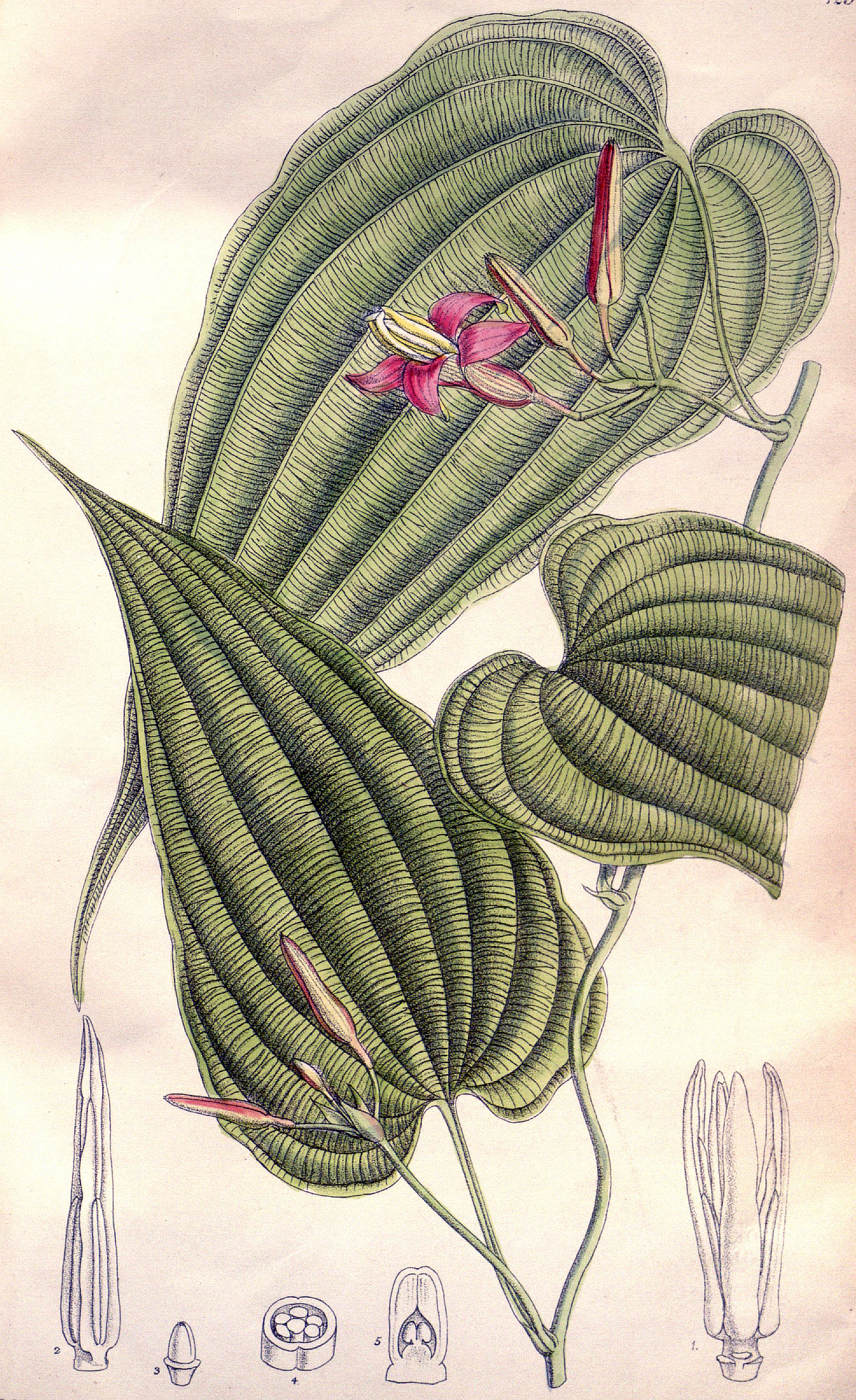
- Stemona curtisii
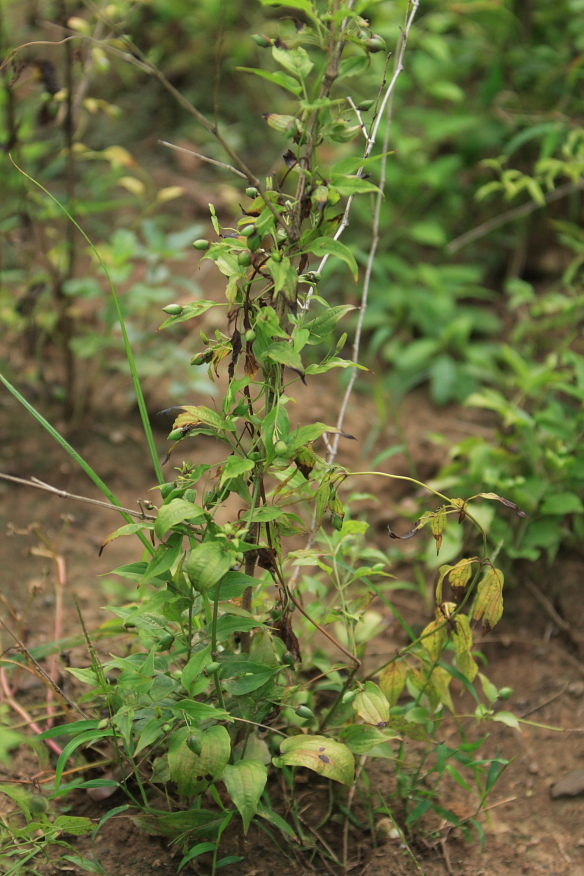
- Stemona japonica

Scientific classification
- Kingdom: Plantae
- Clade: Embryophytes
- Clade: Tracheophytes
- Clade: Angiosperms
- Clade: Monocots
- Order: Pandanales
- Family: Stemonaceae
- Genus: Stemona; Lour.

Synonyms
- Roxburghia Roxb.

= Stemona =

Genus of vines

Stemona is a genus of vines and subshrubs in the family Stemonaceae, described as a genus in 1790.

Stemona is native to China, the Indian subcontinent, Southeast Asia, Papuasia, and northern Australia.

== Species ==
- S. angusta I.Telford - Qld
- S. aphylla Craib - Thailand
- S. australiana (Benth.) C.H.Wright NG, NT, WA, Qld
- S. burkillii Prain - Thailand, Myanmar
- S. cochinchinensis Gagnep. - Vietnam
- S. collinsiae Craib - Thailand, Vietnam
- S. curtisii Hook.f. - Sri Lanka, Nicobar, Thailand, Lepar Island (Indonesia)
- S. griffithiana Kurz - Myanmar
- S. hutanguriana Chuakul - Thailand
- S. involuta Inthachub - Thailand
- S. japonica (Blume) Miquel - SE China, Japan
- S. javanica (Kunth) Engl. - Java, Maluku, Bismarck, NG
- S. kerrii Craib - Yunnan, Thailand, Vietnam
- S. kurzii Prain - Myanmar
- S. lucida (R.Br.) Duyfjes - Qld, NG, Philippines
- S. mairei (H.Léveillé) K.Krause - Sichuan, Yunnan
- S. parviflora C.H.Wright - Hainan
- S. phyllantha Gagnep. - Thailand
- S. pierrei Gagnep. - Vietnam, Laos
- S. prostrata I.Telford - NT
- S. temona rupestris Inthachub - Thailand
- S. sessilifolia (Miq.) Miq. - SE China
- S. squamigera Gagnep. - Laos
- S. tuberosa Lour. - China, Indian subcontinent, SE Asia, New Guinea

== Fossil record ==
2 fossil seeds of †Stemona germanica from the early Miocene, have been found in the Kristina Mine at Hrádek nad Nisou in North Bohemia, the Czech Republic. Fossil seeds of Stemona germanica have also been recorded from the nearby Hartau in Germany. Stemona fossil seeds are recorded from many European sites ranging in ages from the Maastrichtian to the Late Miocene.

== Cultivation and uses ==
Stemona tuberosa (Chinese: 百部; pinyin: bǎi bù), is one of the 50 fundamental herbs used in traditional Chinese medicine.

Stemofoline alkaloids occur in the stems and leaves of Stemona species, particularly S. japonica and have been investigated for use as pharmacological and pesticidal compounds. The chemical structure of the insecticide flupyradifurone was inspired by stemofoline.
