= Flupyradifurone =

- Flupyradifurone

Names
- IUPAC name 4-[(6-Chloropyridine-3-yl)methyl](2,2-difluoroethyl)amino}furan-2(5H)-one
- Other names Flupyradifurone, Sivanto

Identifiers
CAS Number	951659-40-8
3D model (JSmol)	Interactive image
ChEBI	CHEBI:133997
ChemSpider	26050805
ECHA InfoCard	100.231.094
EC Number	804-373-8
PubChem CID	16752772
UNII	8H7JT159D0
CompTox Dashboard (EPA)	DTXSID10872811
- InChI: InChI=1S/C12H11ClF2N2O2/c13-10-2-1-8(4-16-10)5-17(6-11(14)15)9-3-12(18)19-7-9/h1-4,11H,5-7H2 Key: QOIYTRGFOFZNKF-UHFFFAOYSA-N
- SMILES: C1C(=CC(=O)O1)N(CC2=CN=C(C=C2)Cl)CC(F)F

Properties
Chemical formula	C_{12}H_{11}ClF_{2}N_{2}O_{2}
Molar mass	288.68 g·mol^{−1}
Appearance	White to beige solid
Odor	None
Density	1.43 g/mL
Melting point	69 °C (156 °F; 342 K)
Solubility in water	3.2 g/L (pH 4) 3.0 g/L (pH 7)
Solubility in Other	0.0005 g/L (n-Heptane) >250 g/L (Methanol)

Hazards
- GHS labelling
Pictograms	(GHS07: Exclamation mark) (GHS08: Health hazard) (GHS09: Environmental hazard)
Signal word	Warning
Hazard statements	H302, H373, H410
Precautionary statements	P260, P264, P270, P273, P301+P312, P314, P330, P391, P501
- Except where otherwise noted, data are given for materials in their standard state (at 25 °C [77 °F], 100 kPa). Infobox references

Flupyradifurone is a systemic butenolide insecticide developed by Bayer CropScience under the name Sivanto. Flupyradifurone protects crops from sap-feeding pests such as aphids and is safer for non-target organisms compared to other insecticides. Sivanto was launched in 2014 since it obtained its first commercial registration in central America (Guatemala and Honduras). Insecticide Resistance Action Committee (IRAC) classified Flupyradifurone as 4D subset (butenolide) and it is the first pesticide in the butenolide category. It was approved by European Union in 2015.

== Characteristics ==
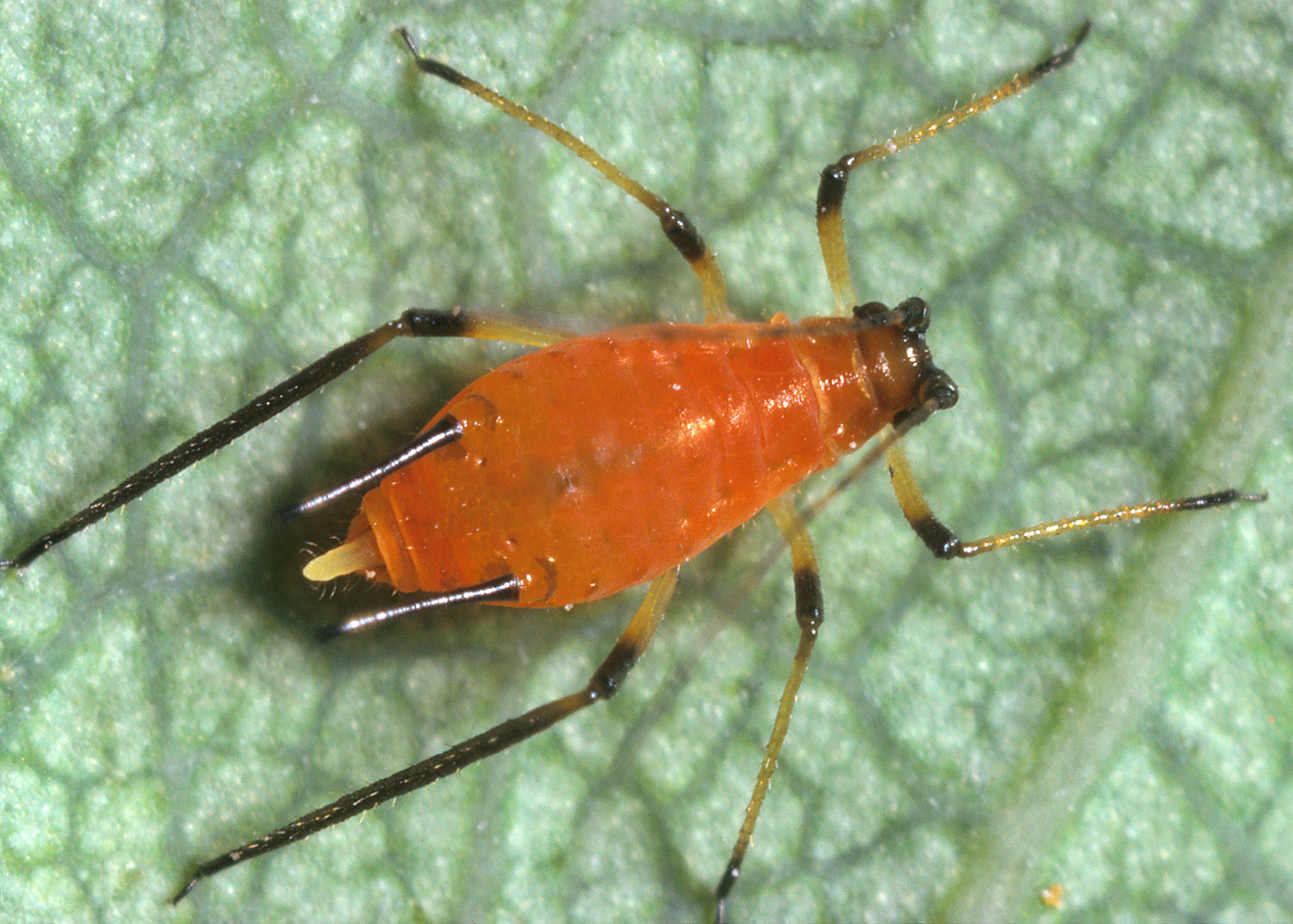
Aphid

Flupyradifurone is used to control sucking pests such as aphids, leafhoppers, psyllids, and whiteflies. It is a systemic insecticide that is absorbed by plants and transported through the xylem. It can be applied on leaves, soil, or seed.

Flupyradifurone is structurally related to the natural insecticide, stemofoline which occurs in the plant species Stemona japonica. Stemofoline has some advantageous features, such as being fast-acting and an effective antifeedant, but does not efficiently bind to insect nicotinic acetylcholine receptors.

== Mode of action ==
Flupyradifurone is an agonist of insect nicotinic acetylcholine receptors, causing depolarization of nerve cells membranes. Insects cannot detoxify flupyradifurone according to the research of CYP6CM1-mediated metabolism. Since flupyradifurone cannot be inactivated by acetylcholinesterase, it will lead to the failure of nerve system of insects and end up with the death of insects.

== Toxicological and ecotoxicological safety ==
Using the U.S. Environmental Protection Agency guidelines to classify carcinogenic effects, flupyradifurone is categorized as "not likely to be carcinogenic to humans." It is not irritant to humans' eyes and skin, and the EPA is not concerned about occupational exposure.

Flupyradifurone is considered a reduced risk insecticide for beneficial insects or other non-target organisms, especially compared to broad-spectrum insecticides such as pyrethroids, neonicotinoids, and organophosates. Its toxicity to honey bees is categorized as very low with a contact LD_{50} of > 100µg/bee and generally does not have adverse effects on honey bees or bumble bees. Flupyradifurone will bind to the nicotinic acetylcholine receptors of honey bees; however, it will only affect the taste and appetitive learning performance at the highest labeled concentration. However, it is highly toxic to aquatic invertebrates.
