= Torreya State Park =

State park and historic site in Florida, United States

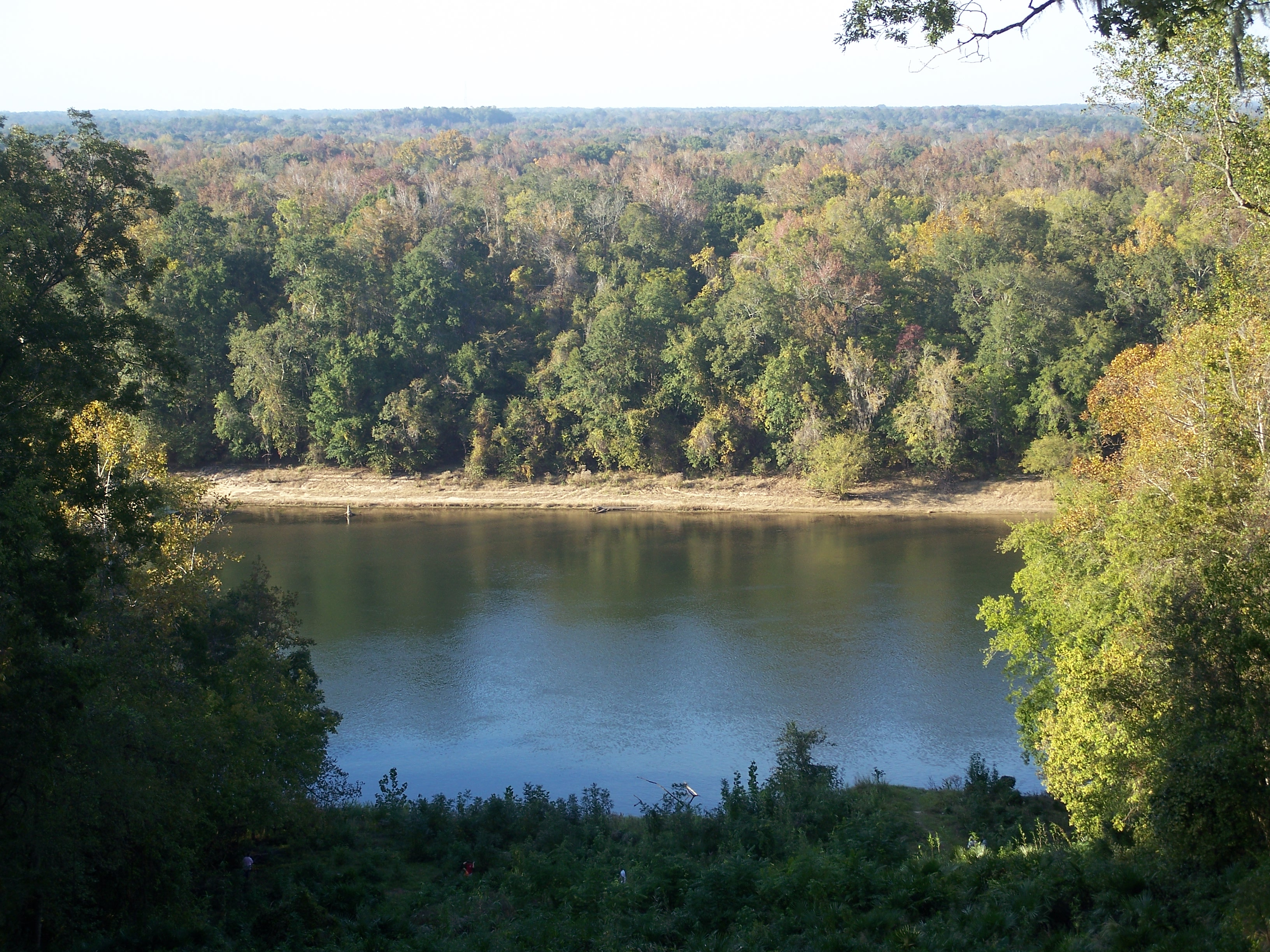
- View of the Apalachicola River from bluffs in Torreya State Park

- Location within Florida Location within the United States
- Interactive map of Torreya State Park
- Location: Liberty County, Florida, United States
- Nearest city: Bristol, Florida
- Coordinates: 30°34′08″N 84°56′53″W
- Area: 13,735 acres (55.58 km^{2})
- Governing body: Florida Department of Environmental Protection

U.S. National Natural Landmark
- Designated: December 1976

Torreya State Park is a 13,735 acres (55.58 km^{2}) Florida State Park, United States National Natural Landmark and historic site thirteen miles (21 km) north of Bristol. It is located north of S.R 12 on the Apalachicola River, in northwestern Florida (Florida Panhandle), at 2576 N.W. Torreya Park Road.

It was named for the Florida Nutmeg (Torreya taxifolia) trees, a rare species of Torreya tree endemic to the local east bank of the Apalachicola River's limestone bluffs.

== Geography ==
With river swamps and high pinelands, extensive ravines and high bluffs along the river, the park has one of the most variable terrains of any in Florida. The high elevation of the park is about 91 m (300 ft) at the top of Logan Hill. Many streams run through the park.

== History ==
Torreya State Park is one of the original Florida state parks developed by the Civilian Conservation Corps during the Great Depression. The park was named for the Florida tree Torreya taxifolia. Due to the river's importance during the Civil War, a six-cannon battery was placed on a bluff to prevent the passage of Union gunboats. These cannons never saw combat action at this location. The gun pits' remains can still be seen in the park.

Prior Native American inhabitation has been confirmed by archaeological discoveries in the area.

In 1818, General Andrew Jackson and his army crossed the Apalachicola here during the First Seminole War. Ten years later, the first government road to cross the new Territory met the river here (see the Bellamy Road).

== Gregory House ==
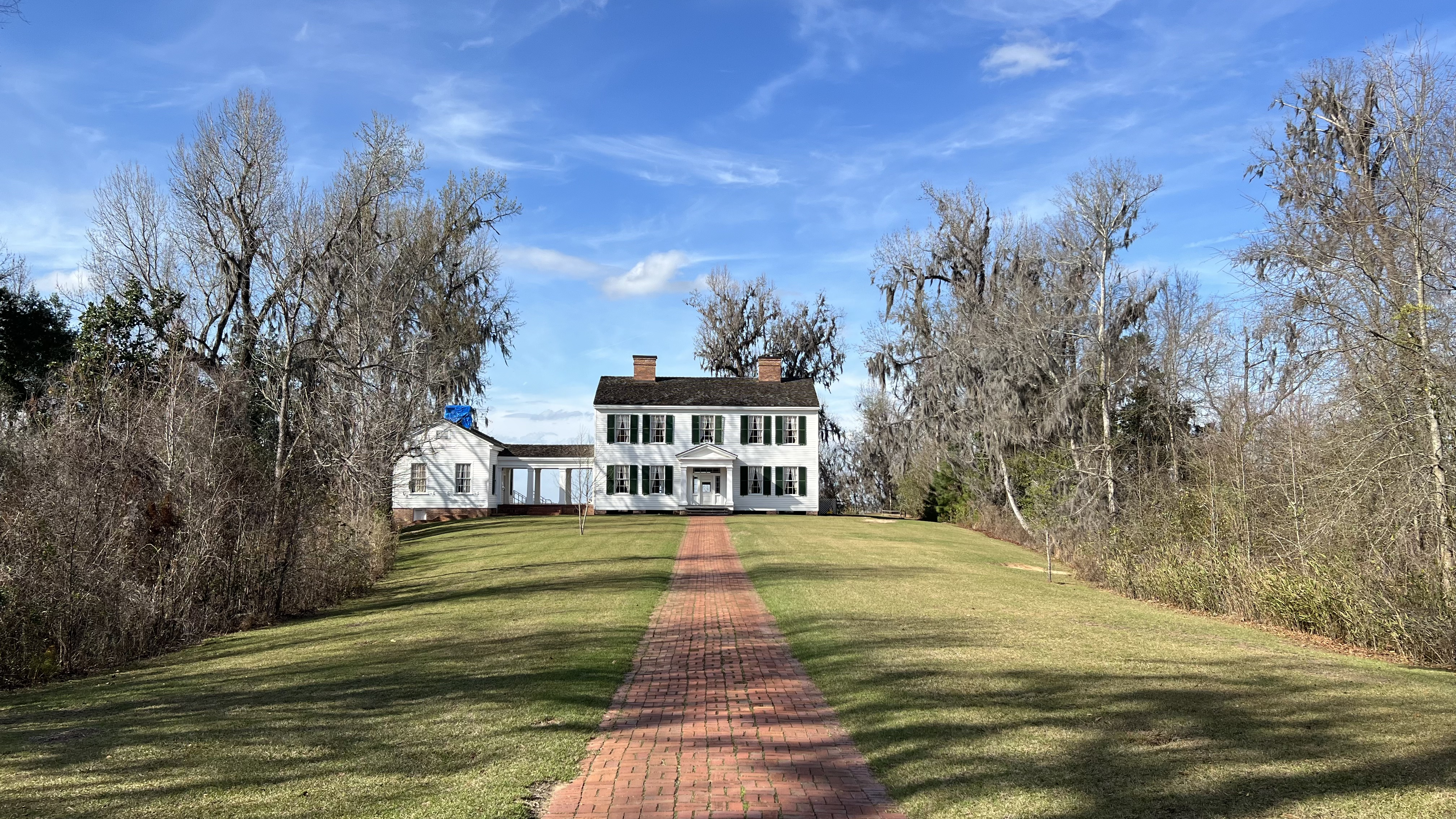
The Gregory House at Torreya State Park

In 1849, Jason Gregory built a plantation house at Ocheesee Landing, across from the park's current location. After the Civil War, like most plantations, it fell into disuse.

Not long after the Civilian Conservation Corps was established in 1933, they started work to create the park. Part of the project in 1935 was disassembling the old Gregory House, moving it across the river and reconstructing it in the park, where it stands today. Visitors can tour the Gregory House for a small fee.

=== Hurricanes and Torreya State Park ===
On October 10, 2018, the eye of Hurricane Michael tracked a few miles west of the park, producing sustained winds over 130 miles per hour. Catastrophic damage occurred within the park and its surrounding area. Trees were either felled, snapped, or stripped of branches, so thinning the tree canopy to a high degree. The park was closed for the remainder of autumn and all through winter as staff toiled to cut hazardous trees and clear fallen wood. However, many of the Florida nutmeg trees under park protection survived.

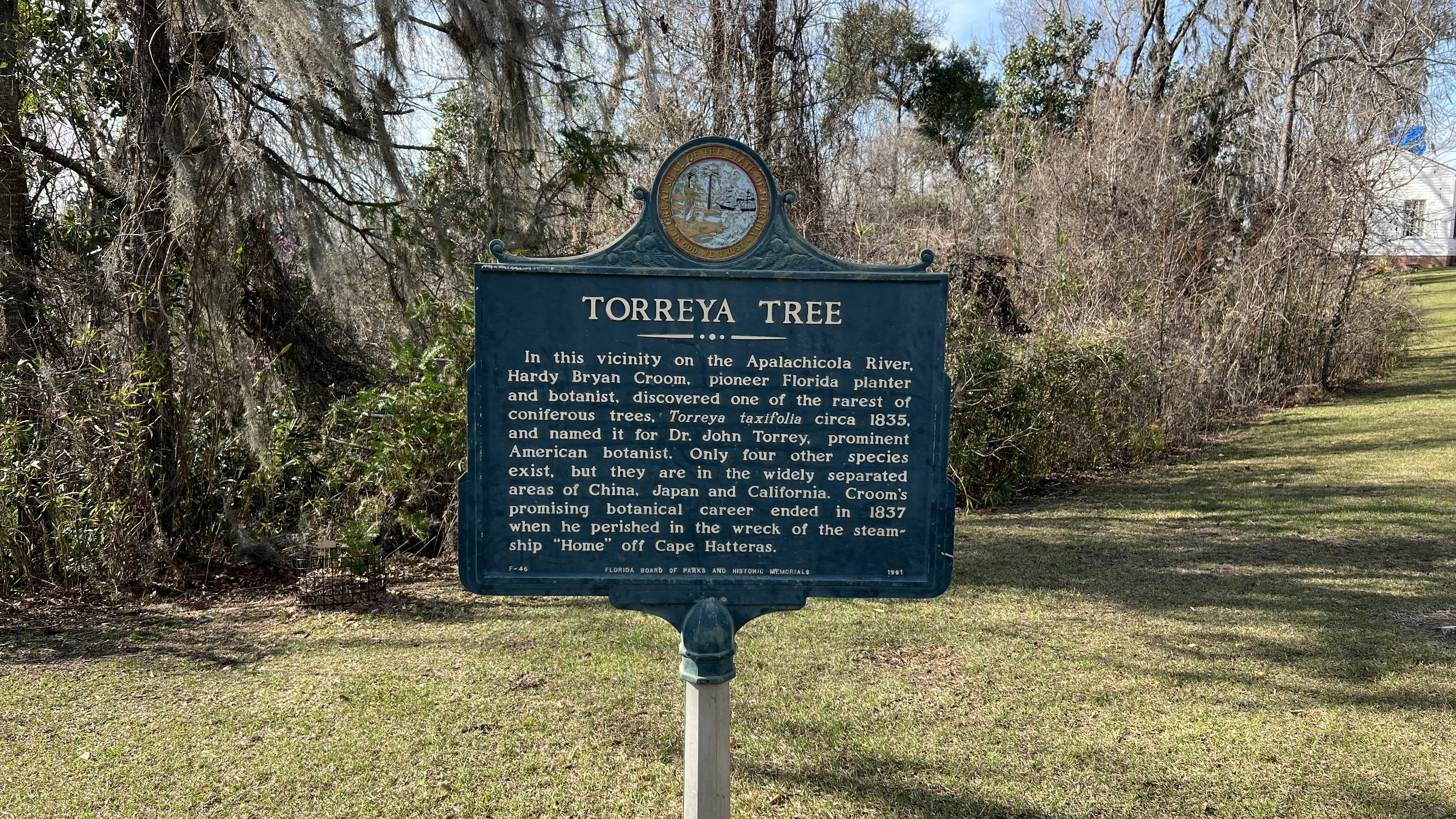
A Florida Historical Marker found at the park

== Natural history ==
=== Flora ===
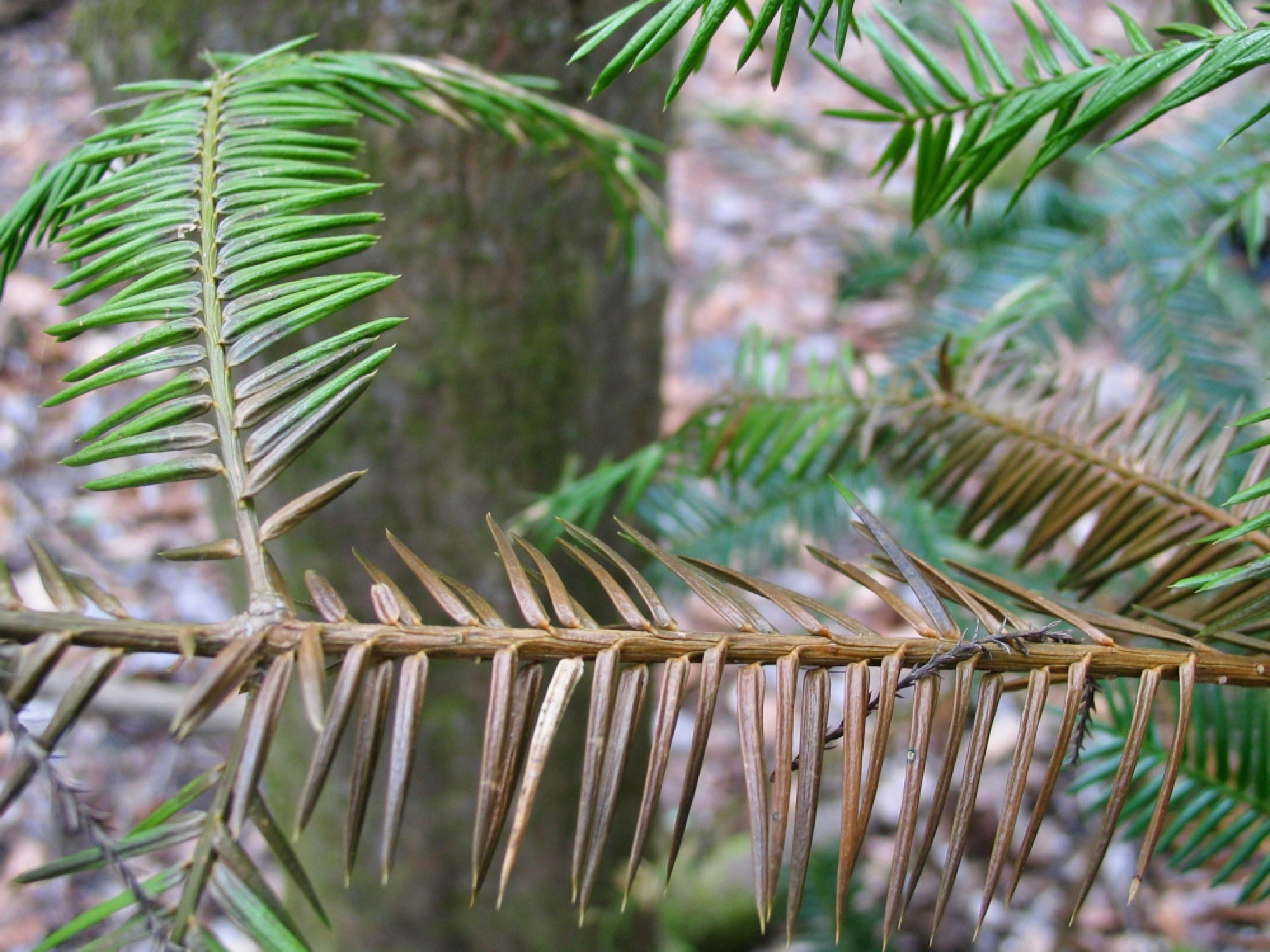
A wild Torreya taxifolia in Torreya State Park

The park is one of the few places in Florida where the endangered species few-flowered croomia (Croomia pauciflora) can still be found. Other endangered species of Florida in the park include the feathery false lily of the valley (Maianthemum racemosum), Canadian honewort (Cryptotaenia canadensis), and bloodroot (Sanguinaria canadensis).

The varieties of hardwood trees include southern live oak (Quercus virginiana), white oak (Quercus alba), water hickory (Carya aquatica), southern wax myrtle (Myrica cerifera), sourwood (Oxydendrum arboreum), American beech (Fagus grandifolia), tulip tree (Liriodendron tulipifera), Florida maple (Acer floridanum), and sweetgum (Liquidambar styraciflua). Species of softwood trees include the variety of both needle palm (Rhapidophyllum hystrix) and dwarf palmetto (Sabal minor), loblolly pine (Pinus taeda), longleaf pine (Pinus palustris), and redbay (Persea borbonia). American sycamore (Platanus occidentalis) and magnolias are also found here.

The endemic Florida nutmeg (Torreya taxifolia) trees are restricted to the limestone bluffs and their ravines within Torreya State Park, along the east bank of the Apalachicola River in northern Florida and southern Georgia. It was one of the first federally listed endangered plant species in the United States in 1984. It is a critically endangered species on the IUCN Red List, due to estimated 98% decline in mature individuals within the last three generations. Its total extent of occurrence is estimated to be about only 200 square kilometres (49,000 acres). The Apalachicola valley served as a refugium for T. taxifola during the last ice age, when its range shrank due to cooler temperatures.

Another critically endangered species found within Torreya State Park is the Florida yew (Taxus floridana). Also endemic to the east bank of the Apalachicola River, the Florida yew has a similar appearance to the Florida nutmeg. The yew can be differentiated by the shorter, blunt-tipped (not spine-tipped) leaves and the less strong smell of the crushed leaves.

=== Fauna ===
Many animals can be seen in the park. Some of the mammals there include deer, squirrel, raccoon, opossum, fox, skunk, rabbit, bobcat and black bear. Dozens of species of birds can be viewed. Numerous species of amphibians and reptiles exist there as well, such as the Eastern Hognose Snake, gopher tortoises, and the rare Apalachicola dusky salamander. Hazardous fauna include alligator, copperhead, cottonmouth, rattlesnakes, and ticks.

== Recreational activities ==
The park has such amenities as birding, boating, hiking, picnicking, wildlife viewing and full camping facilities. It also has concessions, a museum and interpretive exhibit.

The Apalachicola River Bluffs Trail, a National Recreational Trail, is part of the park.

== Gallery ==
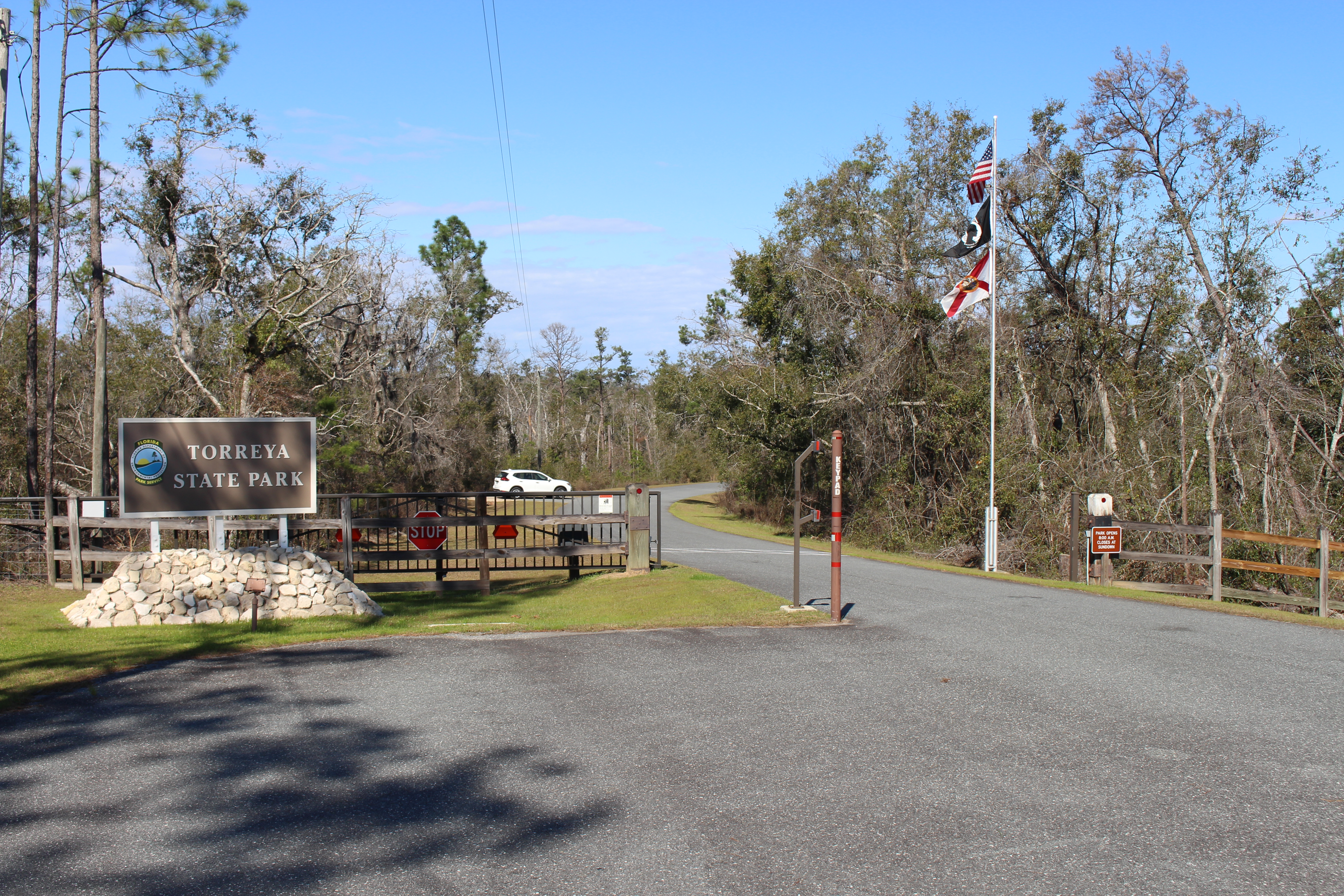
Entrance to Torreya State Park

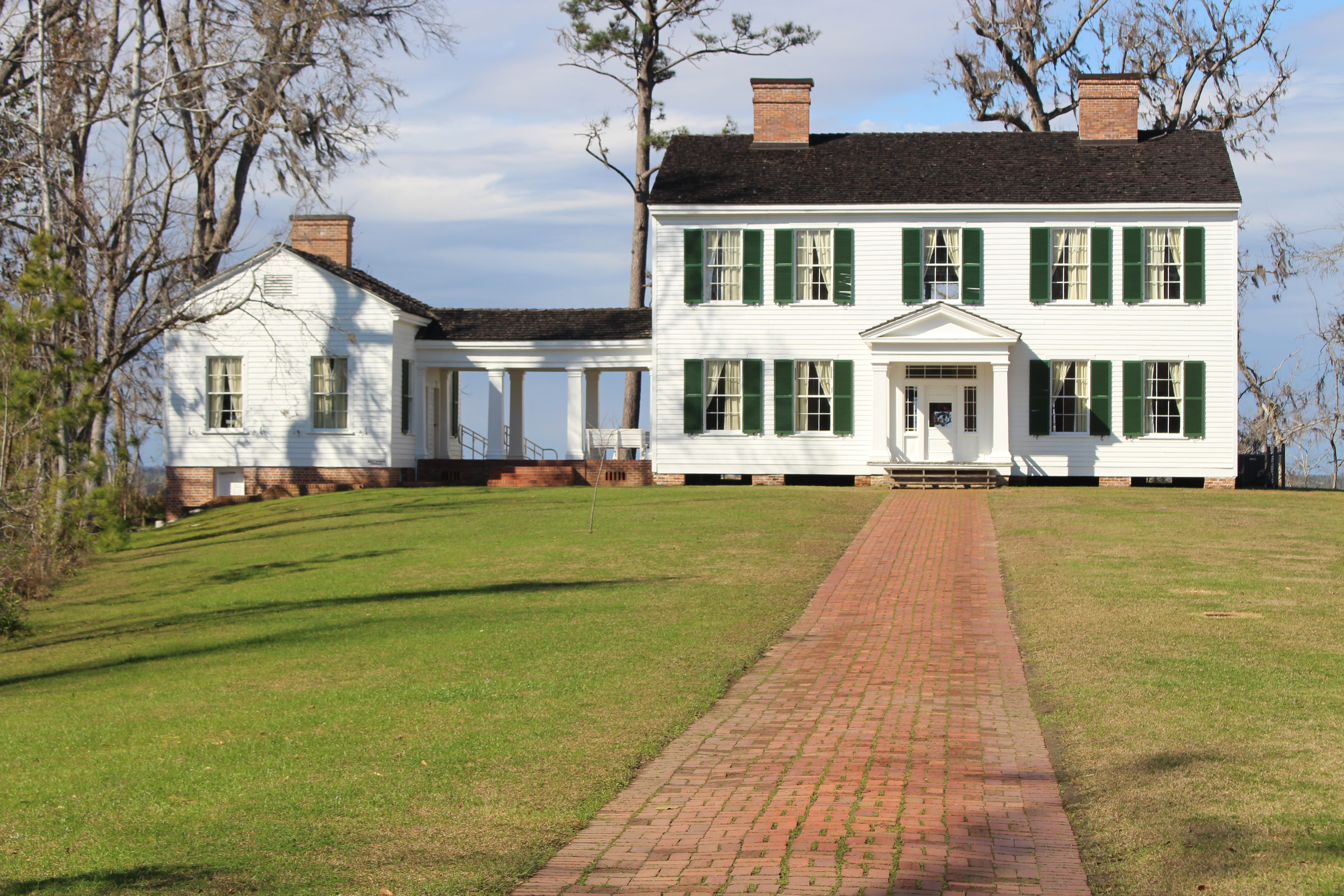
Gregory House at Torreya State Park

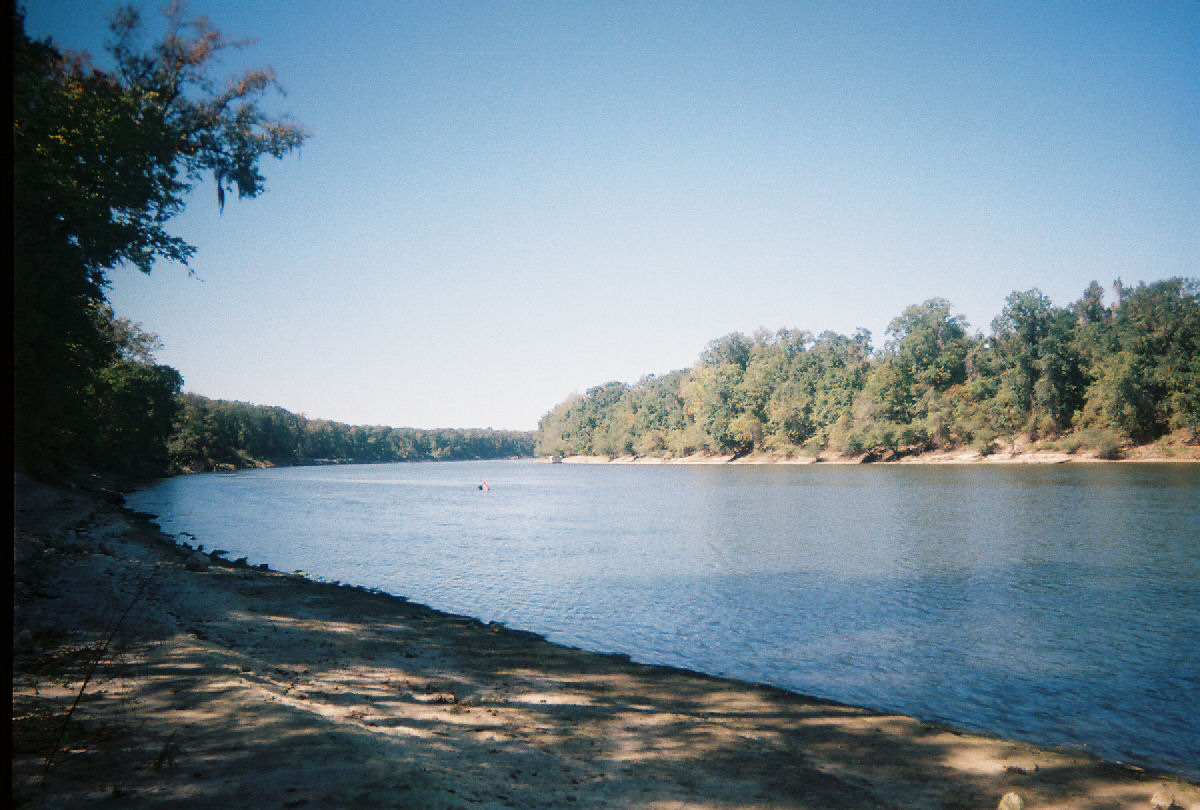
View of the Apalachicola River in Torreya State Park

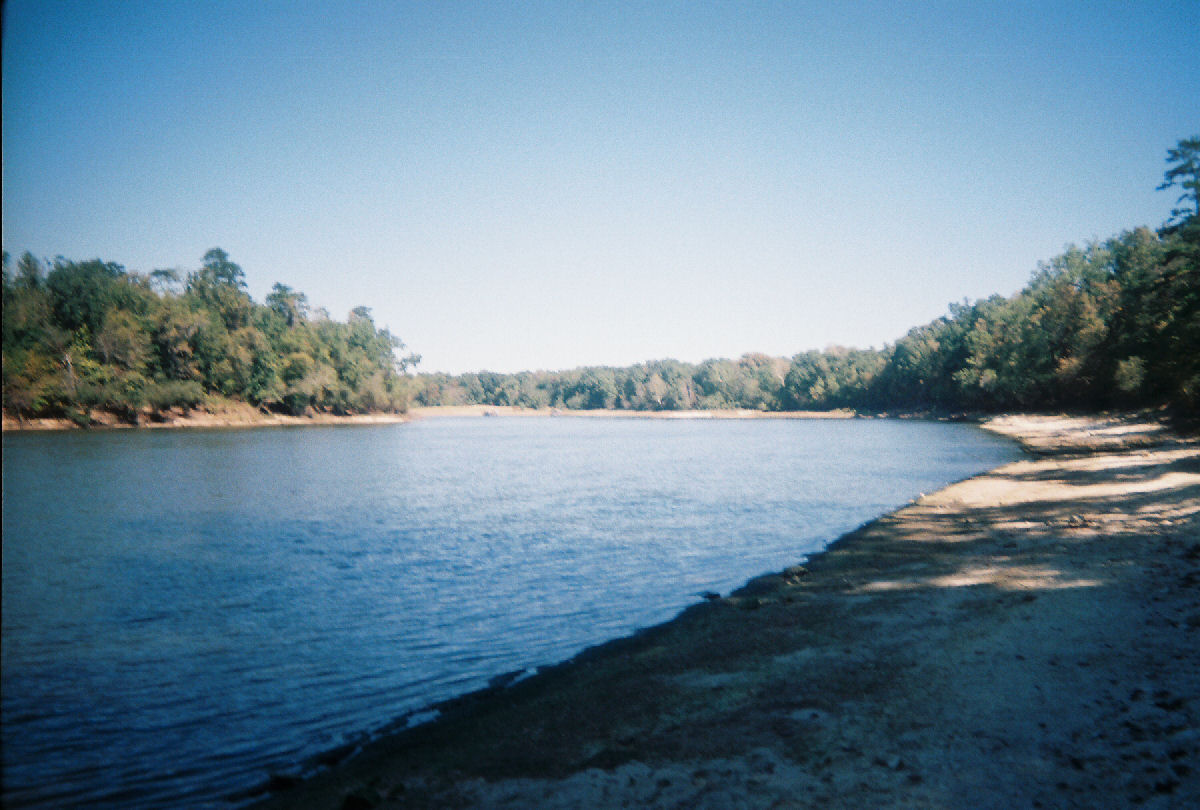
View of the Apalachicola River in Torreya State Park
