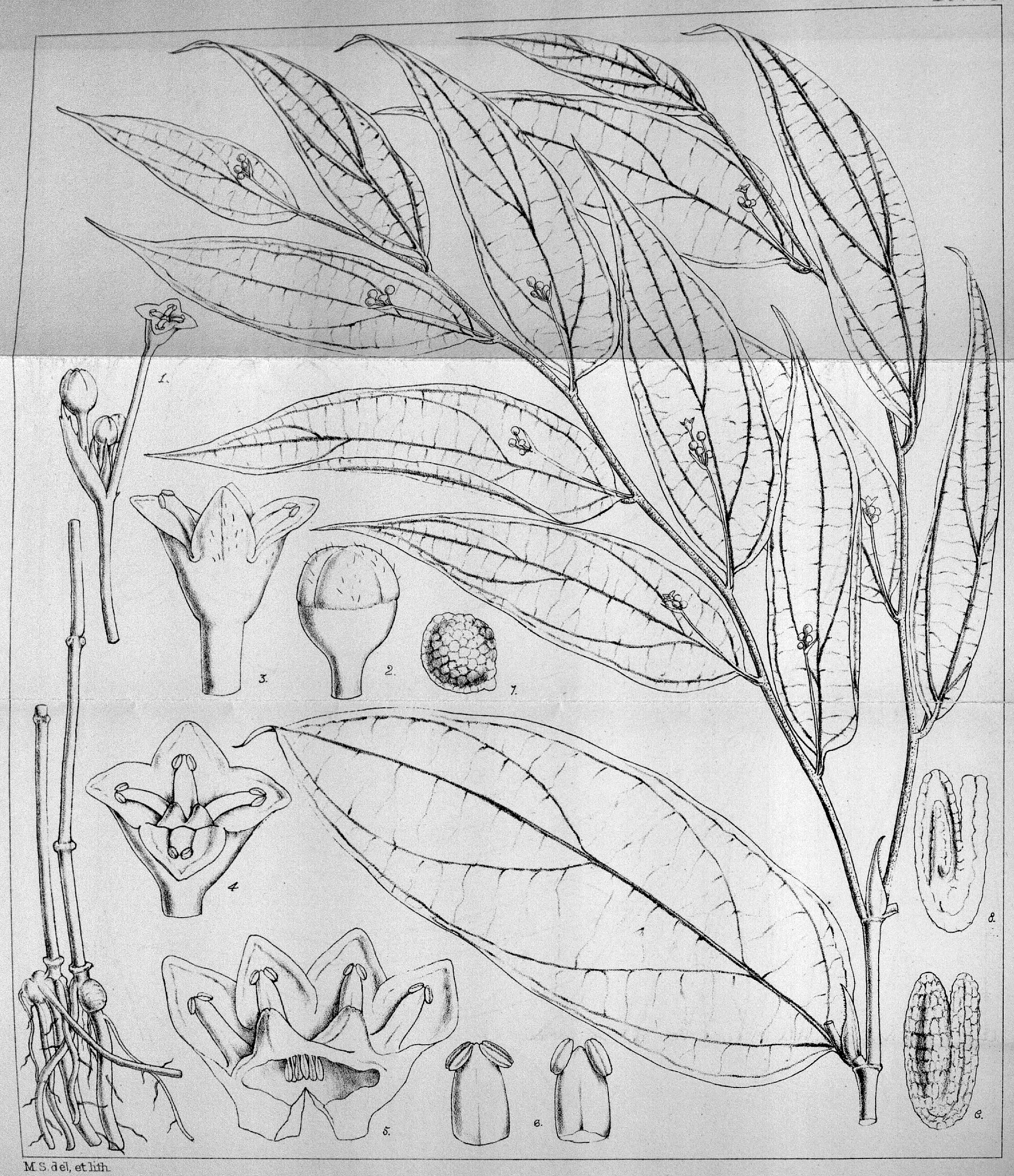
- Stichoneuron membranaceum

Scientific classification
- Kingdom: Plantae
- Clade: Tracheophytes
- Clade: Angiosperms
- Clade: Monocots
- Order: Pandanales
- Family: Stemonaceae
- Genus: Stichoneuron; Hook.f.

= Stichoneuron =

Genus of plants

Stichoneuron is a genus in the family Stemonaceae erected in 1883.

Stichoneuron is native to Assam, Bangladesh, Myanmar, Thailand, and Peninsular Malaysia.

Species

- Stichoneuron bognerianum Duyfjes - Johor
- Stichoneuron calcicola Inthachub - southern Thailand
- Stichoneuron caudatum Ridl. - Thailand, Peninsular Malaysia
- Stichoneuron halabalense Inthachub - southern Thailand, Peninsular Malaysia
- Stichoneuron membranaceum Hook.f. - Assam, Bangladesh, Myanmar
