= Croomia pauciflora =

Conservation status
- Vulnerable (NatureServe)

Scientific classification
- Kingdom: Plantae
- Clade: Tracheophytes
- Clade: Angiosperms
- Clade: Monocots
- Order: Pandanales
- Family: Stemonaceae
- Genus: Croomia
- Species: C. pauciflora

Binomial name
- Croomia pauciflora (Nutt.) Torr.

Synonyms
- Cissampelos pauciflora Nutt.

Species of flowering plant

Croomia pauciflora is a plant species native to Florida, Alabama, Georgia and Louisiana. Croomia pauciflora is generally found in rich loams in forests.

C. pauciflora is a perennial herb spreading by underground rhizomes. It has scale-like leaves around the base, and 3-6 cordate to elliptical green leaves at the tip of the stem. The greenish flowers are borne in a cyme.

The specific epithet pauciflora is Latin for 'few-flowered'.
