= Pentastemona =

Scientific classification
- Kingdom: Plantae
- Clade: Tracheophytes
- Clade: Angiosperms
- Clade: Monocots
- Order: Pandanales
- Family: Stemonaceae
- Genus: Pentastemona; Steenis

Genus of flowering plants

Pentastemona is a genus in the family Stemonaceae, described as a genus in 1982. In 1992, Duyfjes placed the genus in its own family, the Pentastemonaceae, but this is not widely accepted. It is the only monocot genus with pentamerous flower parts (i.e. five petals, five sepals, five stamens and five carpels).

The entire genus is endemic to the island of Sumatra in Indonesia.

== Species ==
Two species are accepted:

- Pentastemona egregia (Schott) Steenis
- Pentastemona sumatrana Steenis
