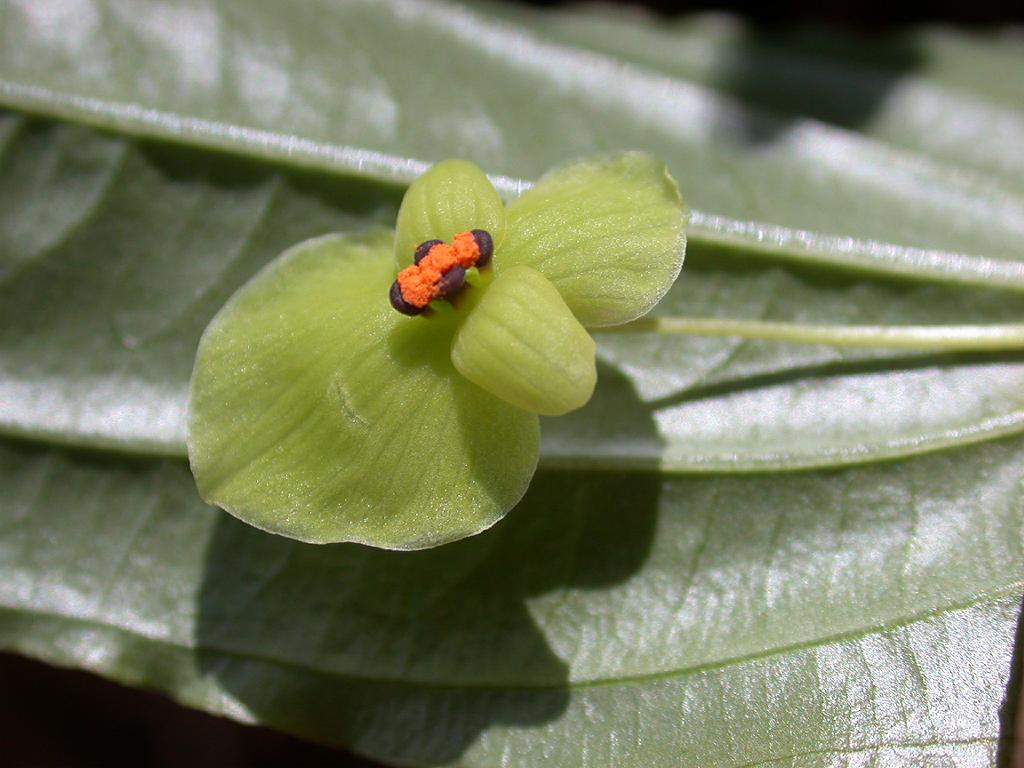
- Croomia heterosepala flower

Scientific classification
- Kingdom: Plantae
- Clade: Tracheophytes
- Clade: Angiosperms
- Clade: Monocots
- Order: Pandanales
- Family: Stemonaceae
- Genus: Croomia; Torr.

Synonyms
- Torreya H.B.Croom ex Meisn. 1843, illegitimate homonym, not Arn. 1838 (Taxaceae) nor Raf. 1818 (Lamiaceae) nor Raf. 1819 (Cyperaceae) nor Spreng. 1820 (Verbenaceae) nor A.A. Eaton 1829 (Loasaceae)

= Croomia =

Genus of flowering plants

Croomia is a genus of primitive angiosperm herbs in the Stemonaceae family, first described as a genus in 1840.

== Taxonomy ==
Once included in its own family, Croomiaceae, Croomia has also previously been included in Dioscoreaceae.

=== Subdivision ===
About six species.

- Croomia heterosepala (Baker) Okuyama - Japan
- Croomia hyugaensis Kadota & Mas.Saito - Kyushu
- Croomia japonica Miq. - Anhui, Fujian, Jiangxi, Zhejiang, Chugoku, Kyushu
- Croomia kinoshitae Kadota - Shikoku
- Croomia pauciflora (Nutt.) Torr. - United States (FL GA AL LA)
- Croomia saitoana Kadota - Kyushu

== Distribution and habitat ==
Croomia is native to China, Japan, and the southeastern United States. The plants grow in moist, shady woods. Their small flowers are borne beneath the leaves.

== Bibliography ==
- Dahlgren, Rolf; Clifford, H. T. (1982). The monocotyledons: A comparative study. London and New York: Academic Press.
