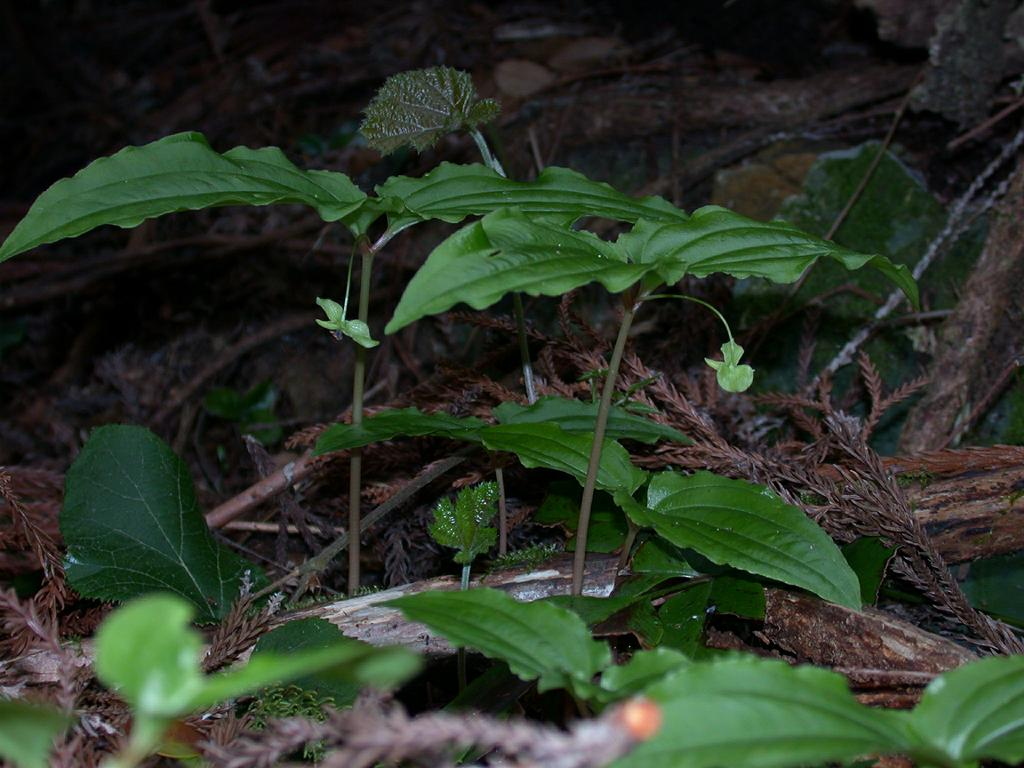
- Croomia heterosepala

Scientific classification
- Kingdom: Plantae
- Clade: Embryophytes
- Clade: Tracheophytes
- Clade: Spermatophytes
- Clade: Angiosperms
- Clade: Monocots
- Order: Pandanales
- Family: Stemonaceae; Caruel

Genera
- Croomia Torr.; Pentastemona Steenis; Stemona Lour.; Stichoneuron Hook.f.

Synonyms
- Croomiaceae; Roxburghiaceae

= Stemonaceae =

Stemonaceae Temporal range: Upper Cretaceous – recent 84–0 Ma

Family of flowering plants

The Stemonaceae are a family of monocotyledonous flowering plants placed in the order Pandanales. The family consists of four genera with ca 37 known species distributed in areas with seasonal climate across Southeast Asia and tropical Australia. One native species is found in the United States. In earlier systems the family was called Roxburghiaceae, after Roxburghia, now Stemona.

== Description ==
The stems may be erect or trailing, green or yellow-green, or sometimes reddish. Leaves are dark green and also alternate in the majority of the members. Flowers are borne in short cymes, arising from the lower parts of the plant. Seeds are ellipsoidal or globular in shape.

As in other members of the Pandanales, the flower morphology in the Stemonaceae is distinctive and rather atypical for monocots, whose floral anatomy is three-parted (trimerous). In the majority of Stemonaceae species, flowers are composed of four identical parts, i.e., tetramerous, or sometimes dimerous (two-parted). Four stamens are present. In most of the members, tepals are four. They are smooth or sometimes papillate, which may be because the papillae function as odour-producing structures (osmophores). In Pentastemona, the flowers are pentamerous (five-parted) and the number of stamens is five. Microsporogenesis is successive, as with the majority of monocots. Flower colours include shades of purple, maroon, green, or yellow. They attract pollinators by resembling carrion, and sometimes emit a similar odour — flies visiting the flowers serve as pollinators.

== Taxonomy ==
The Stemonaceae, also referred to as the Roxburghiaceae, were once placed in a separate order, the Stemonales, or the Dioscoreales, sister order to the Pandanales. Also Croomia had been treated within its own family, Croomiaceae.

- Stemonaceae
  - Pentastemona
  - - Stemona
    - - Stichoneuron
      - Croomia

The family Stemonaceae is sister to other two families in the Pandanales that together form a clade - these are Cyclanthaceae and Pandanaceae. Pentastemona diverged first from the family, so is a sister clade to the rest of it. Actually, the genus demonstrates characteristics rather more different from other members of the Stemonaceae. In earlier classifications, it was placed in its own family. However, Stemona is sister to the other two genera that together form a clade. The family appears in Late Cretaceous - around 84 Mya, although the stem group diverged earlier in the same period - 108 Mya.

== Ecology ==
The Stemonaceae contain various herbaceous plants, many of which are crawling or climbing species preferring moist or dry tropical habitats. They form underground organs as spindle-shaped rhizomes used for reservation of nutrients.

== Uses ==
The family contains plants with various therapeutical and other uses in places such as China, Laos, Japan, Thailand, and others. Some members are used for making an insecticide. In Laos, people use them against fleas and lice by making an infusion which they drink to make their blood poisonous. Plants from the family are used for the preparation of a fish poison. Others play a role in folk medicine and are valued for their antibacterial, antitussive, antifungal, and other properties against lung or skin diseases.

== Bibliography ==
- Huber, H (1969). "Die Samenmerkmale und Verwandtschaftsverhältnisse der Liliifloren". Mitt. Bot. Staatssamml.[Mitteilungen der Botanischen Staatssammlung München] (in German). 8: 219–538.
- Hutchinson, John (1959) [1926–1934]. The families of flowering plants, arranged according to a new system based on their probable phylogeny. 2 vols (2nd ed.). Macmillan.
- Dahlgren, Rolf; Clifford, H. T. (1982). The monocotyledons: A comparative study. London and New York: Academic Press.
- Stemonaceae in L. Watson and M. J. Dallwitz (1992 onwards),
- Pentastemonaceae Archived 2007-06-27 at the Wayback Machine in L. Watson and M. J. Dallwitz (1992 onwards), The families of flowering plants
