= List of culinary nuts =

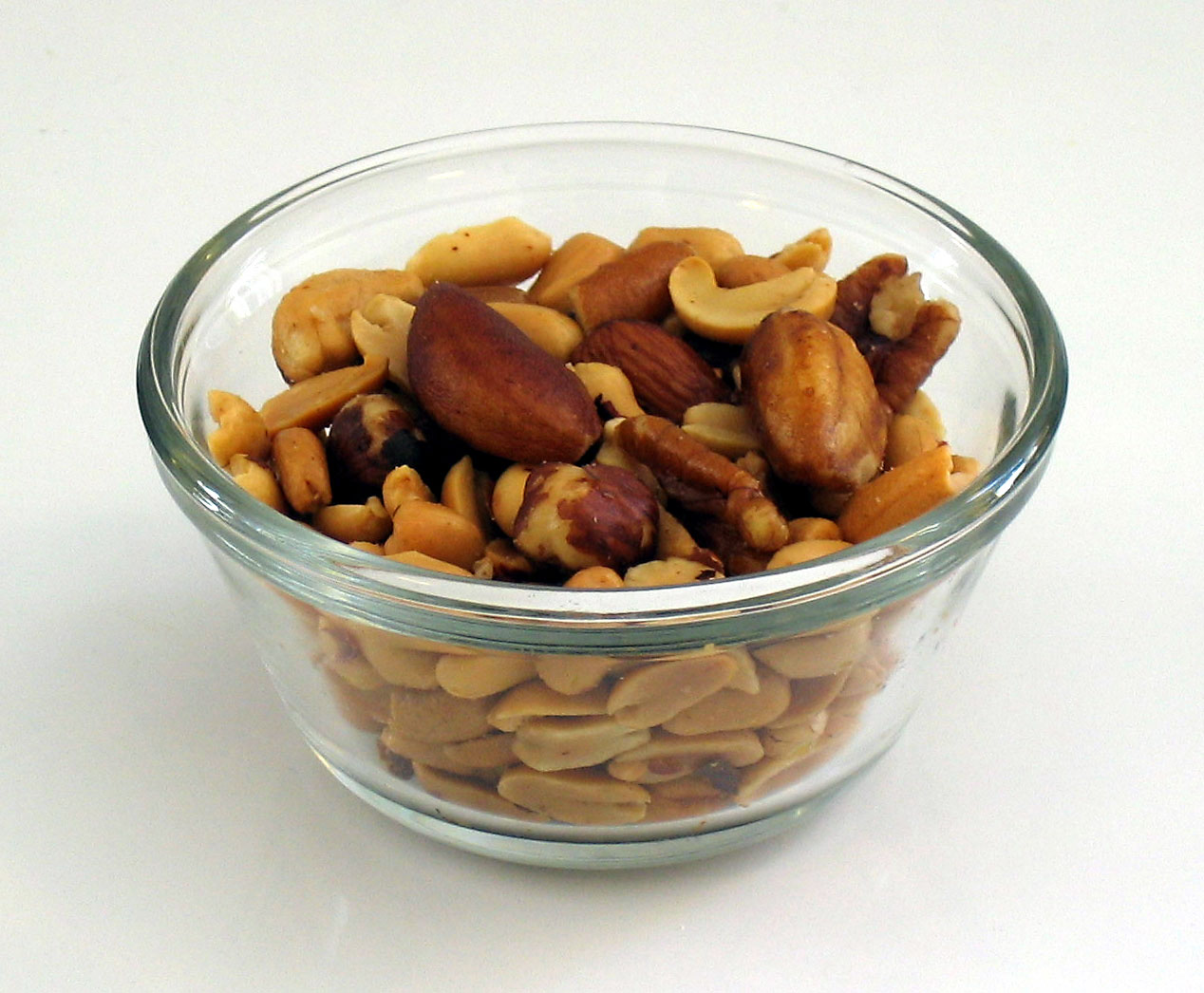
A small bowl of mixed nuts

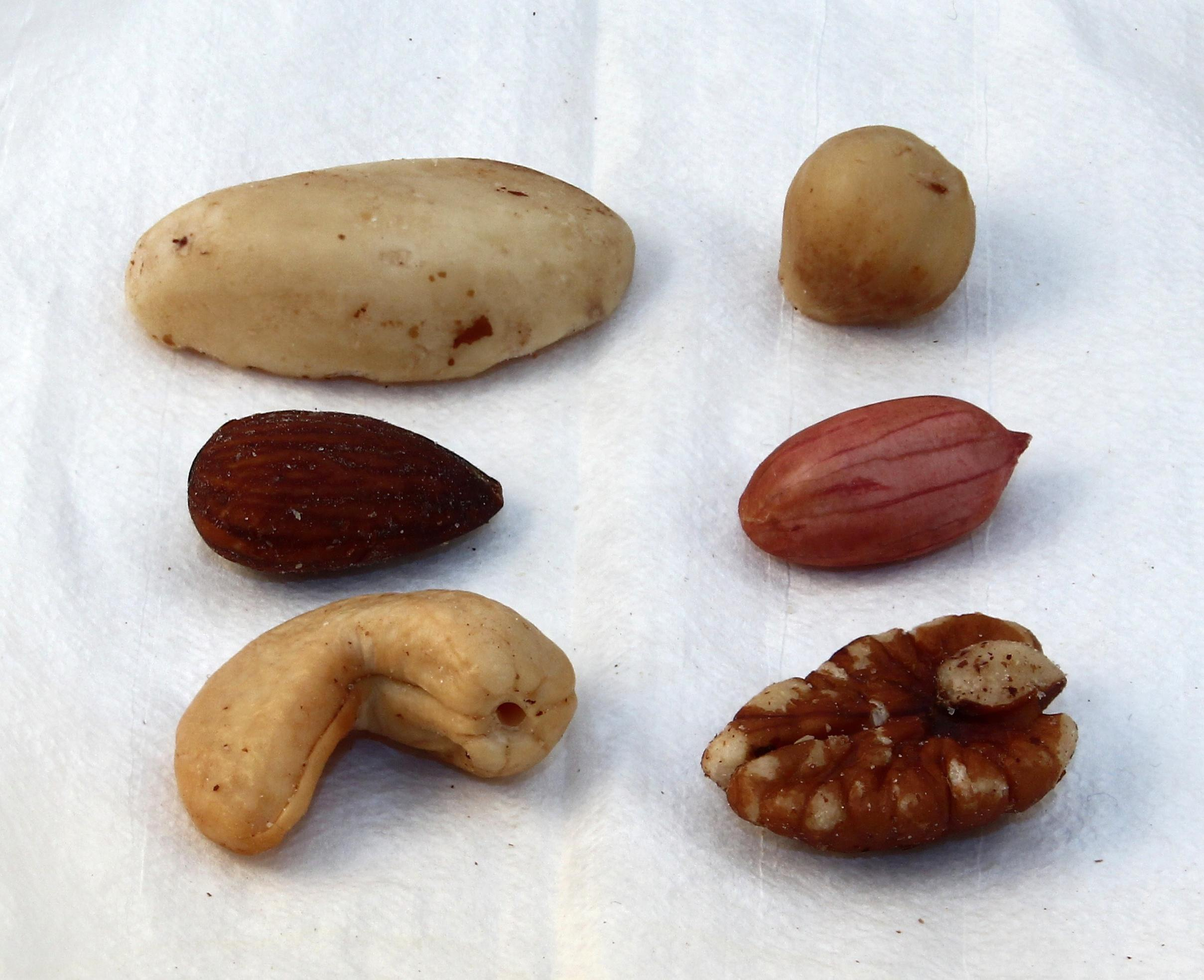
An assortment of mixed nuts

A culinary nut is a dry, edible fruit or seed that usually, but not always, has a high fat content. Nuts are used in a wide variety of edible roles, including in baking, as snacks (either roasted or raw), and as flavoring. In addition to botanical nuts, fruits and seeds that have a similar appearance and culinary role are considered to be culinary nuts. Culinary nuts are divided into fruits or seeds in one of four categories:

- True, or botanical nuts: dry, hard-shelled, uncompartmented fruit that do not split on maturity to release seeds (e.g. hazelnuts);
- Drupes: seed contained within a pit (stone or pyrena) that itself is surrounded by a fleshy fruit (e.g. almonds, walnuts);
- Gymnosperm seeds: naked seeds, with no enclosure (e.g. pine nuts);
- Angiosperm: seeds surrounded by an enclosure, such as a pod or a fruit (e.g. peanuts).

Nuts have a rich history as food. For many indigenous peoples of the Americas, a wide variety of nuts, including acorns, American beech, and others, served as a major source of starch and fat over thousands of years. Similarly, a wide variety of nuts have served as food for Indigenous Australians for many centuries. Other culinary nuts, though known from ancient times, have seen dramatic increases in use in modern times. The most striking such example is the peanut. Its usage was popularized by the work of George Washington Carver, who discovered and popularized many applications of the peanut after employing peanut plants for soil amelioration in fields used to grow cotton.

== True nuts ==
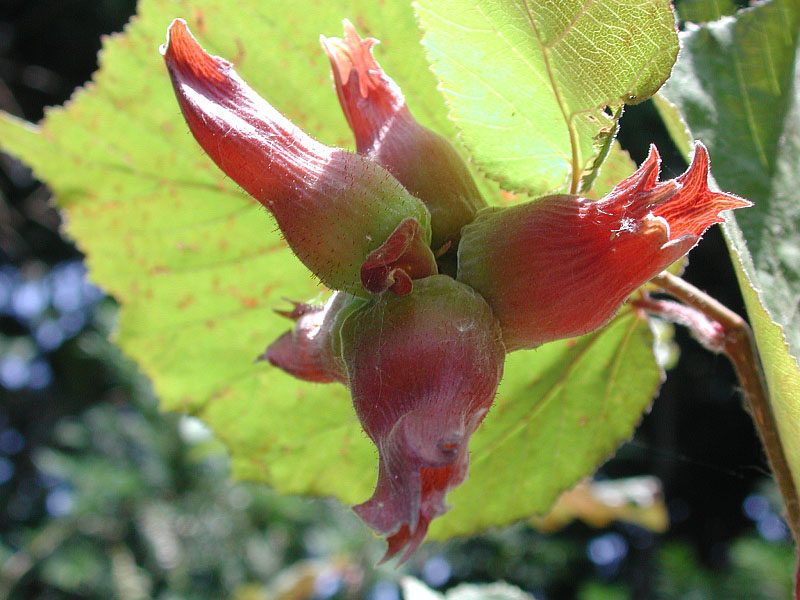
Corylus maxima, native to Europe and Western Asia

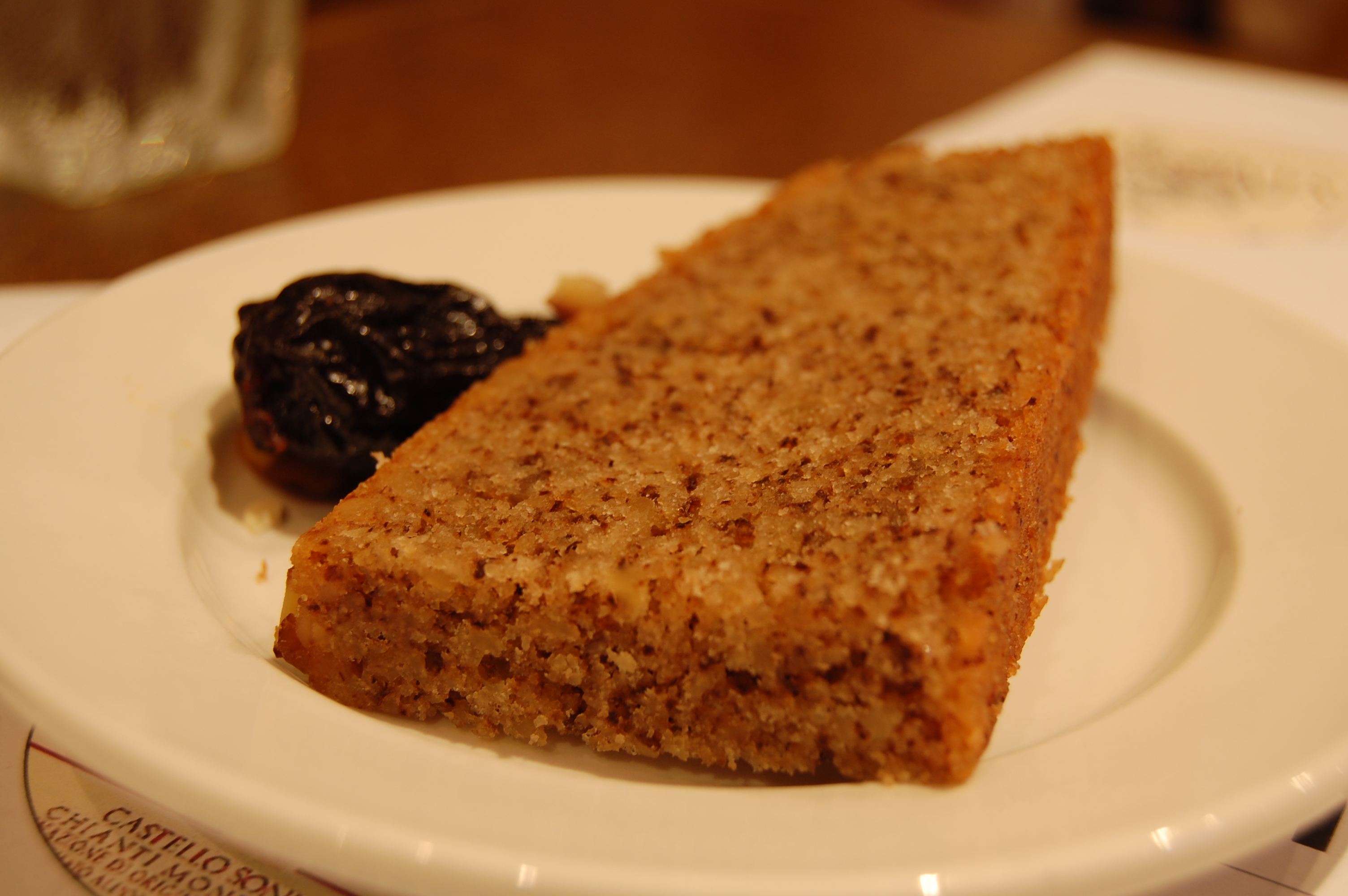
A slice of chestnut cake, prepared using chestnuts

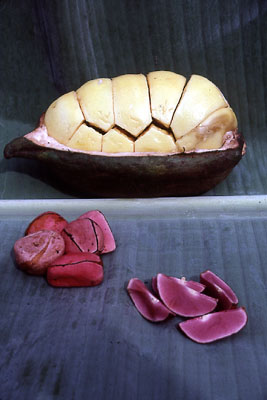
A kola nut

The following are both culinary and botanical nuts.

- Acorn (Quercus, Lithocarpus and Cyclobalanopsis spp.), used from ancient times among indigenous peoples of the Americas as a staple food, in particular for making bread and porridge.
- Beech (Fagus spp.)
  - American beech (Fagus grandifolia), used by indigenous peoples of the Americas as food. Several tribes sought stores of beech nuts gathered by chipmunks and deer mice, thus obtaining nuts that were already sorted and shelled.
  - European beech (Fagus sylvatica), although edible, have never been popular as a source of food. They have been used as animal feed and to extract a popular edible oil.
- Breadnut (Brosimum alicastrum), used by the ancient Maya peoples as animal fodder, and as an alternative food when yield of other crops was insufficient.
- Candlenut (Aleurites moluccana), used in many South East Asian cuisines.
- Chestnuts (Castanea spp.)
  - Chinese chestnuts (Castanea mollissima), have been eaten in China since ancient times.
  - Sweet chestnuts (Castanea sativa), unlike most nuts, are high in starch and sugar. Extensively grown in Europe and the Himalayas.
  - Note that the 'water chestnut' is a tuber, not a nut.
- Guinea peanut (Pachira glabra), like those of the related Malabar chestnut, the seeds taste similar to peanuts and are typically boiled or roasted, with the roasted seeds sometimes ground to make a hot drink.
- Hazelnuts (Corylus spp.), most commercial varieties of which descend from the European hazelnut (Corylus avellana). Hazelnuts are used to make pralines, in the popular Nutella spread, in liqueurs, and in many other foods.
  - American hazelnut (Corylus americana), appealing for breeding because of its relative hardiness.
  - Deeknut (Corylus dikana), grows in hot, excessively dry areas. An occasional garnish used in Middle Eastern dishes.
  - Eastern and western beaked hazel (Corylus cornuta), native to the United States.
  - European hazelnut (Corylus avellana), source of most commercial hazelnuts.
  - Filbert (Corylus maxima), commonly used as "filler" in mixed nut combinations.
  - Several other species are edible, but not commercially cultivated to any significant extent. These include the cold-tolerant Siberian hazelnut (C. heterophylla), C. kweichowensis, which grows in the warmer parts of China, C. sieboldiana, which grows in Japan and China, and other minor Corylus species.
- Johnstone River almond (Elaeocarpus bancroftii), prized food among northern Indigenous Australians.
- Karuka (Pandanus spp.), native to Papua New Guinea. Both the planted and wild species are eaten raw, roasted or boiled, providing food security when other foods are less available.
  - Planted karuka (Pandanus julianettii), cultivated species, planted by roughly half the rural population of Papua New Guinea.
  - Wild karuka (Pandanus brosimos), important food source in villages at higher altitudes in New Guinea.
- Kola nut (Cola spp.), from a West African relative of the cocoa tree, is the origin of the cola flavor in soft drinks.
- Kurrajong (Brachychiton spp.), native to Australia, highly regarded as a bush food among northern Indigenous Australians.
- Malabar chestnut (Pachira aquatica), have a taste reminiscent of peanuts when raw, and of cashews or European chestnuts (which they strongly resemble) when roasted.
- Mongongo (Ricinodendron rautanenii), abundant source of protein among Bushmen in the Kalahari Desert. Also of interest as a source of oil for skin care.
- Sacha inchi (Plukenetia volubilis), the roasted seeds can be consumed as nuts.
- Palm nuts (Elaeis spp.), important famine food among the Himba people in Africa.
- Red bopple nut (Hicksbeachia pinnatifolia), native to the east coast of Australia. Low in fat, high in calcium and potassium. Eaten as bush food. Considered similar, but inferior to the macadamia.
- Yellow walnut (Beilschmiedia bancroftii), native to Australia where it served as a staple food among Indigenous Australians.

== Drupe seeds ==
A drupe is a fleshy fruit surrounding a stone, or pit, containing a seed. Some of these seeds are culinary nuts as well.

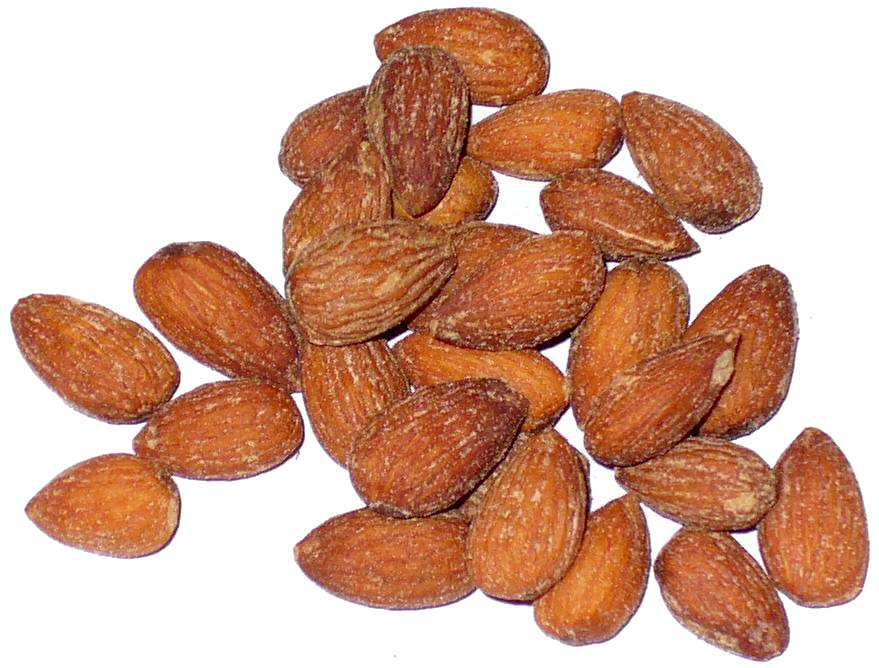
Smoked almonds

- Almonds (Prunus dulcis) have a long and important history of religious, social and cultural significance as a food. Speculated to have originated as a natural hybrid in Central Asia, almonds spread throughout the Middle East in ancient times and thence to Eurasia. The almond is one of only two nuts mentioned in the Bible.
- Apricot kernels are sometimes used as an almond substitute, an apricot seed derived ersatz-Marzipan is known as "Persipan" in German and is extensively used in foods like Stollen.
- Australian cashew nut (Semecarpus australiensis) is a source of food for Indigenous Australians of north-eastern Queensland and Australia's Northern Territory.
- Baru nut (Dipteryx alata) is a source of food for indigenous Afro-Brazilian communities living in the Brazilian Cerrado. The nut is eaten toasted or boiled.
- Betel or areca nuts (Areca catechu) are chewed in many south-east Asian cultures because of their psychoactive properties due to the presence of the alkaloid Arecoline. They are also used in Indian cuisine to make sweet after-dinner treats (mukwas) and breath-fresheners (paan masala). Differently from other nuts, they are not considered safe for consumption in any form, and their daily usage by around 600 million people worldwide has been described as a severe public health emergency.
- Borneo tallow nuts (Shorea spp.) are grown in the tropical rain forests of Southeast Asia, as a source of edible oil.
- Canarium spp.
  - Canarium nut (Canarium harveyi, Canarium indicum, or Canarium commune) has long been an important food source in Melanesia.
  - Chinese olive (Canarium album) pits are processed before use as an ingredient in Chinese cooking.
  - Pili nuts (Canarium ovatum) are native to the Philippines, where they have been cultivated for food from ancient times.
- Cashews (Anacardium occidentale) grow as a drupe that is attached to the cashew apple, the fruit of the cashew tree. Native to northeastern Brazil, the cashew was introduced to India and East Africa in the sixteenth century, where they remain a major commercial crop. The nut must be roasted (or steamed) to remove the caustic shell oil before being consumed.
- Chilean hazel (Gevuina avellana), from an evergreen native to South America, similar in appearance and taste to the hazelnut.
- Coconut (Cocos nucifera), used worldwide as a food. The fleshy part of the seed is edible, and used either desiccated or fresh as an ingredient in many foods. The pressed oil from the coconut is used in cooking as well.
- Gabon nut (Coula edulis) has a taste comparable to hazelnut or chestnut. It is eaten raw, grilled or boiled.
- Hickory (Carya spp.)
  - Mockernut hickory (Carya tomentosa), native to North America, named after the heavy hammer (moker in Dutch) required to crack the heavy shell and remove the nutmeat.
  - Pecans (Carya illinoinensis) are the only major commercial nut tree native to North America. Pecans are eaten as a snack food, and used as an ingredient in baking and other food preparation.
  - Shagbark hickory (Carya ovata) has over 130 named cultivars. They are a valuable source of food for wildlife, and were eaten by indigenous peoples of the Americas and settlers alike.
  - Shellbark hickory (Carya laciniosa) nuts are sweet, and are the largest of the hickories. They are also eaten by a wide variety of wildlife.
- Irvingia spp. are native to Africa.
  - Bush mango (Irvingia gabonensis) has both edible fruit and an edible nut, which is used as a thickening agent in stews and soups in West African cuisines.
  - Ogbono nut (Irvingia wombolu) is similar to the bush mango, but the fruit is not edible.
- Jack nuts (Artocarpus heterophyllus) are the seeds of the jack fruit. With a taste like chestnuts, they have an extremely low fat content of less than 1%.
- Jelly palm nut (Butia capitata), sweet edible fruit, and edible nut.
- Bread nuts (Artocarpus camansi) similarly have a chestnut-like taste and very low fat content.
- Panda oleosa is used in Gabon in a similar way to bush mango nuts, as well as to extract an edible oil.
- Pekea nut, or butter-nut of Guyana (Caryocar nuciferum), harvested locally for its highly prized edible oil.
- Pistachio (Pistacia vera L.), cultivated for thousands of years, native to West Asia. It is one of only two nuts mentioned in the Bible.
- Walnut (Juglans spp.)
  - Black walnut (Juglans nigra), also popular as food for wildlife, with an appealing, distinctive flavor. Native of North America.
  - Butternut (Juglans cinerea) (or white walnut) is native to North America. Used extensively, in the past, by Native American tribes as food.
  - English walnut (Juglans regia) (or Persian walnut) was introduced to California around 1770. California now represents 99% of US walnut growth. It is often combined with salads, vegetables, fruits or desserts because of its distinctive taste.
  - Heartnut, or Japanese walnut (Juglans aitlanthifolia), native to Japan, with a characteristic cordate shape. Heartnuts are often toasted or baked, and can be used as a substitute for English walnuts.

== Nut-like gymnosperm seeds ==
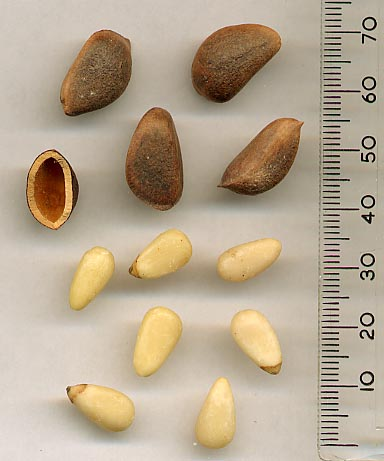
Pine nuts are edible gymnosperm seeds.

A gymnosperm, from the Greek gymnospermos (γυμνόσπερμος), meaning "naked seed", is a seed that does not have an enclosure. The following gymnosperms are culinary nuts. All but the ginkgo nut are from evergreens.

- Cycads (Macrozamia spp.)
  - Burrawang nut (Macrozamia communis), a major source of starch for Indigenous Australians around Sydney.
- Ginkgo nuts (Ginkgo biloba) are a common ingredient in Chinese cooking. They are starchy, low in fat, protein and calories, but high in vitamin C.
- Araucaria spp.
  - Bunya nut (Araucaria bidwillii) is native to Queensland, Australia. Nuts are the size of walnuts, and rich in starch.
  - Monkey-puzzle nut (Araucaria araucana) has nuts twice the size of almonds. Rich in starch. Roasted, boiled, eaten raw, or fermented in Chile and Argentina.
  - Paraná pine nut (Araucaria angustifolia) (or Brazil pine nut) is an edible seed similar to pine nuts.
- Pine nuts (Pinus spp.) Pine nuts can be toasted and added to salads and are used as an ingredient in pesto, among other regional uses.
  - Chilgoza pine (Pinus gerardiana), common in Central Asia. Nuts are used raw, roasted or in confectionery products.
  - Colorado pinyon (Pinus edulis), in great demand as an edible nut, with average annual production of 454 to 900 tonnes.
  - Korean pine (Pinus koraiensis), a pine-nut yielding species native to Asia.
  - Mexican pinyon (Pinus cembroides), found in Mexico and Arizona. Nuts are eaten raw, roasted, or made into flour.
  - Single-leaf pinyon (Pinus monophylla) grows in foothills from Mexico to Idaho. Eaten as other pine nuts. Also sometimes ground and made into pancakes.
  - Stone pine, or pignolia nut (Pinus pinea) is the most commercially important pine nut.
- Torreya nuts (Torreya spp.)
  - Chinese nutmeg-yew nuts (Torreya grandis) were recorded as a culinary tribute as early as the Song Dynasty and the tree is still cultivated for nut production today.
  - Japanese nutmeg-yew (Torreya nucifera) is native to Japan and Jeju Island.
  - California nutmeg tree (Torreya californica) although inedible raw, the seeds were reportedly prized as a food source by the aboriginal peoples of California.
- Gnetum nuts (Gnetum spp.) including Gnetum gnemon and Gnetum africanum.

== Nut-like angiosperm seeds ==
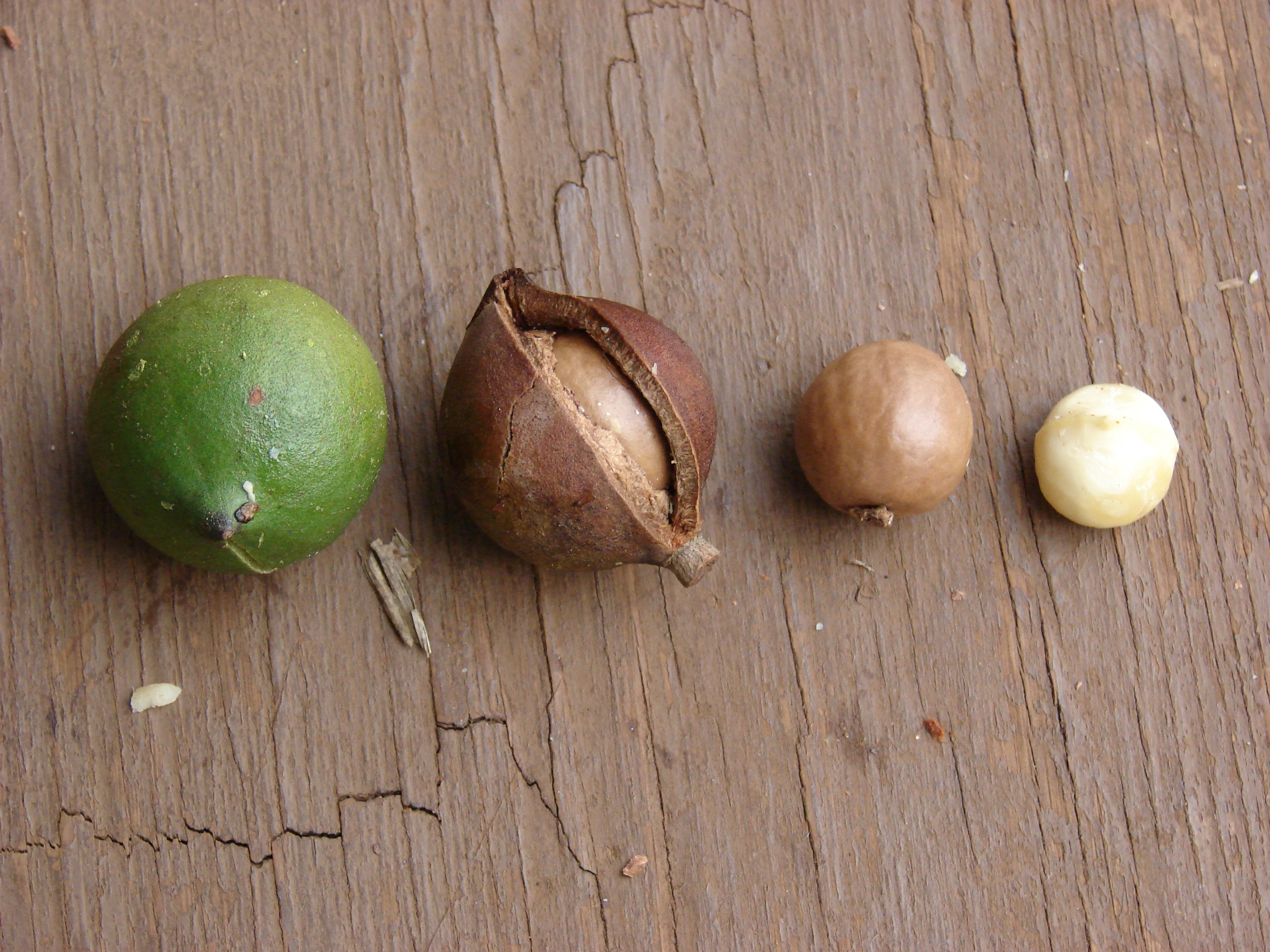
Macadamia nuts are angiosperm seeds.

These culinary nuts are seeds contained within a larger fruit, and are flowering plants.

- Brazil nut (Bertholletia excelsa) is harvested from an estimated 250,000–400,000 trees per year. Highly valued, and used in the confectionery and baking trades. Excellent dietary source of selenium.
- Macadamia (Macadamia spp.) are primarily produced in Hawaii and Australia. Both species are native to Australia. They are a highly valued nut. Waste nuts are commonly used to extract an edible oil.
  - Macadamia nut (Macadamia tetraphylla) has a rough shell, and is the subject of some commercialization.
  - Queensland macadamia nut (Macadamia integrifolia) has a smooth shell, and is the principal commercial macadamia nut.
- Paradise nut (Lecythis usitata), native to the Amazon rainforest, highly regarded by indigenous tribal people.
- Peanut, or groundnut (Arachis hypogaea), a legume and grown on the ground, not on a tree or bush, originally from South America, has grown from a relatively minor crop to one of the most important commercial nut crops, in part due to the work of George Washington Carver at the beginning of the 20th century.
- Peanut tree (Sterculia quadrifida) or bush peanut, native to Australia. Requires no preparation. (Note: Not to be confused with peanuts (groundnuts).)
- Soybean (Glycine max), a legume and grown on the ground, not on a tree or bush, is used as a nut, secondary to its use as an oil seed.

== See also ==
- List of edible seeds
- Tiger nut (not a nut, despite its name)

== Works cited ==
- Janick, Jules; Paull, Robert E. (2008). The Encyclopedia of Fruit and Nuts. CABI. ISBN 978-0-85199-638-7.
- Moerman, Daniel E. (2010). Native American Food Plants: An Ethnobotanical Dictionary. Timber Press. ISBN 978-1-60469-189-4.
- Nugent, Jeff; Boniface, Julia (2004). Permaculture plants: a selection (2nd ed.). Chelsea Green Publishing. ISBN 1-85623-029-5.
- Rosengarten, Jr., Frederic (2004). The Book of Edible Nuts. Courier Dover Publications. ISBN 0-486-43499-0.
