= Conifer nut =

Common name for edible conifer seed

Conifer nuts are the edible seeds of conifers. The most notable of these are pine nuts (family Pinaceae), but also include Araucaria nuts (family Araucariaceae) and Torreya nuts (Family Taxaceae). If gnetophytes are nested within the conifers, this group would also include melinjo (Gnetum gnemon) nuts and the seeds of other Gnetum species. As all come from gymnosperms, these are only nuts in a culinary sense, not in a botanical sense.

== Pine nuts ==
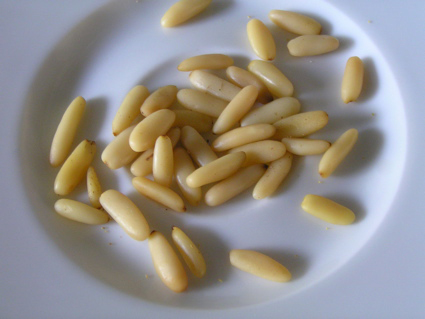
Shelled European pine (Pinus pinea) nuts

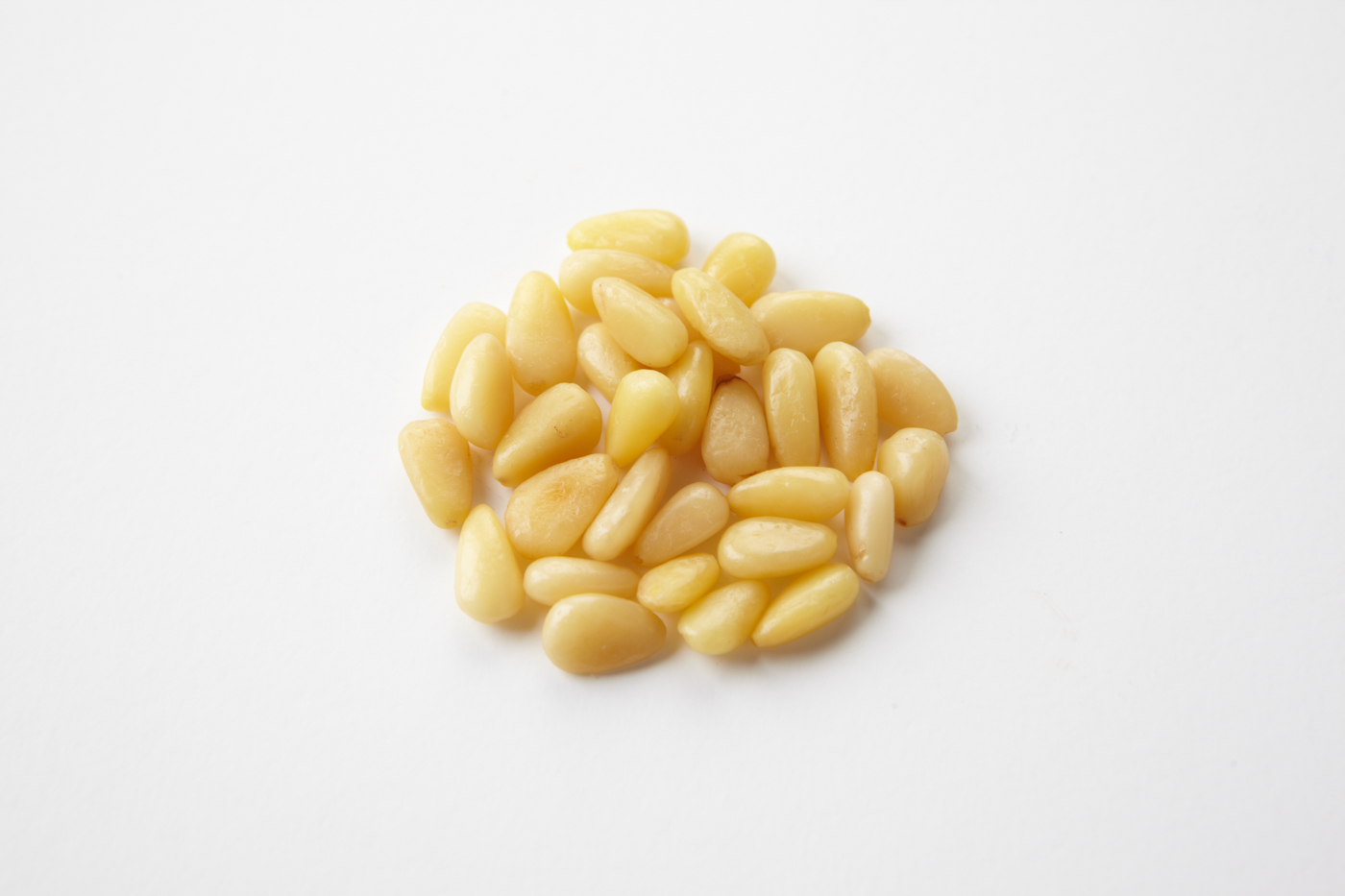
Shelled Korean pine (Pinus koraiensis) nuts

Pine nuts, also called piñón (Spanish: [piˈɲon]), pinoli (Italian: [piˈnɔːli]), or pignoli, are the edible seeds of pines (family Pinaceae, genus Pinus). According to the Food and Agriculture Organization, only 29 species provide edible nuts, while 20 are traded locally or internationally owing to their seed size being large enough to be worth harvesting; in other pines, the seeds are also edible but are too small to be of notable value as human food. The biggest exporters of pine nuts are China, Russia, North Korea, and Pakistan.

As pines are gymnosperms, not angiosperms (flowering plants), pine nuts are not "true nuts"; they are not botanical fruits, the seed not being enclosed in an ovary which develops into the fruit, but simply bare seeds—"gymnosperm" meaning literally "naked seed" (from Ancient Greek: γυμνός, romanized: gymnos, lit. 'naked' and σπέρμα, sperma, 'seed'). The similarity of pine nuts to some angiosperm fruits is an example of convergent evolution.

== Araucaria nuts ==
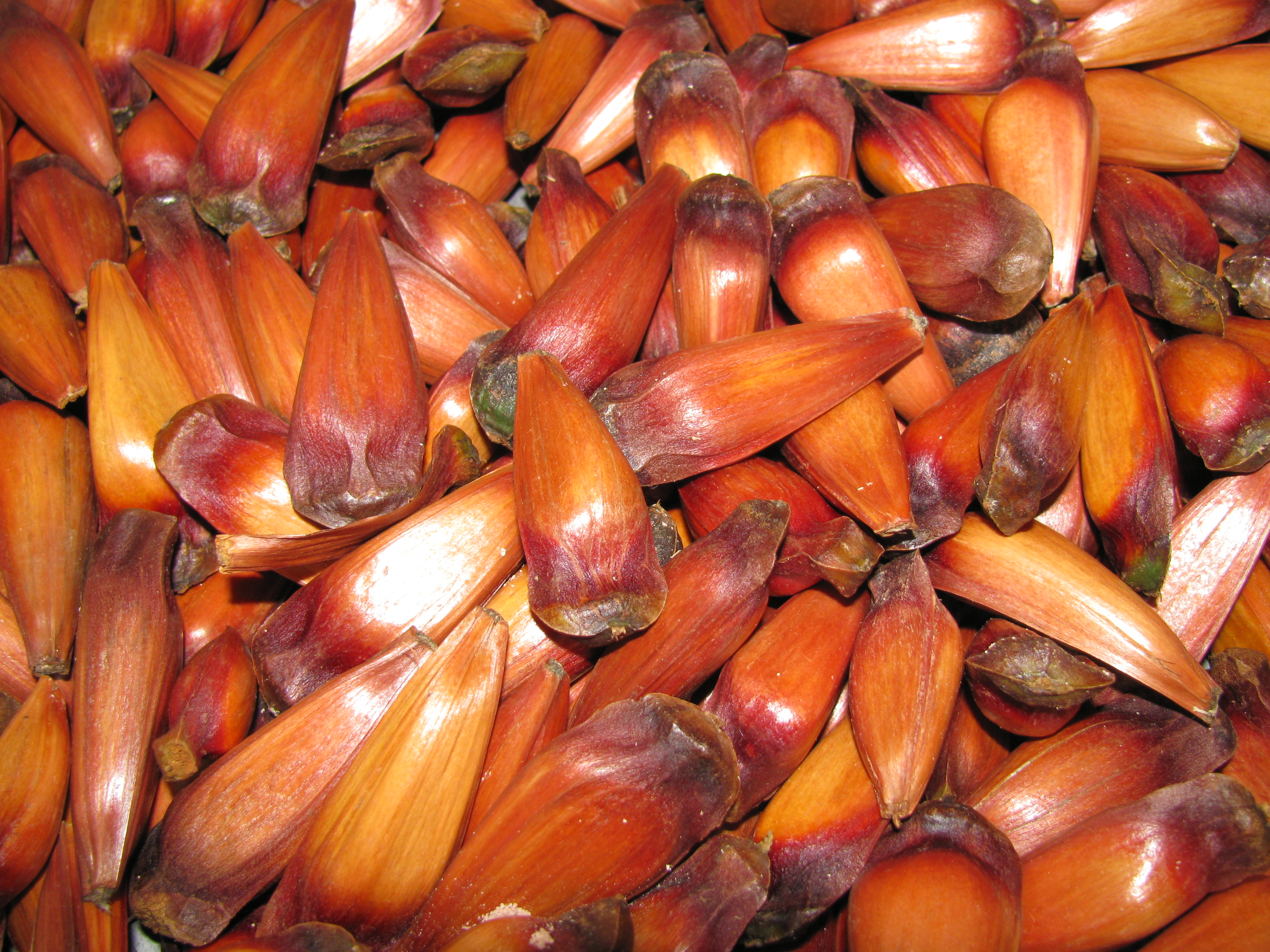
Araucaria angustifolia nuts

The edible large seeds of A. araucana, A. angustifolia and A. bidwillii — also known as Araucaria nuts, and often called, although improperly, pine nuts — are eaten as food, particularly among the Mapuche people of Chile and southwest Argentina, the Kaingang people in Southern Brazil and among Indigenous Australians. In South America, Araucaria nuts or seeds are called piñas or piñones in Spanish and pinhões in Portuguese, like pine nuts in Europe.

== Torreya nuts ==
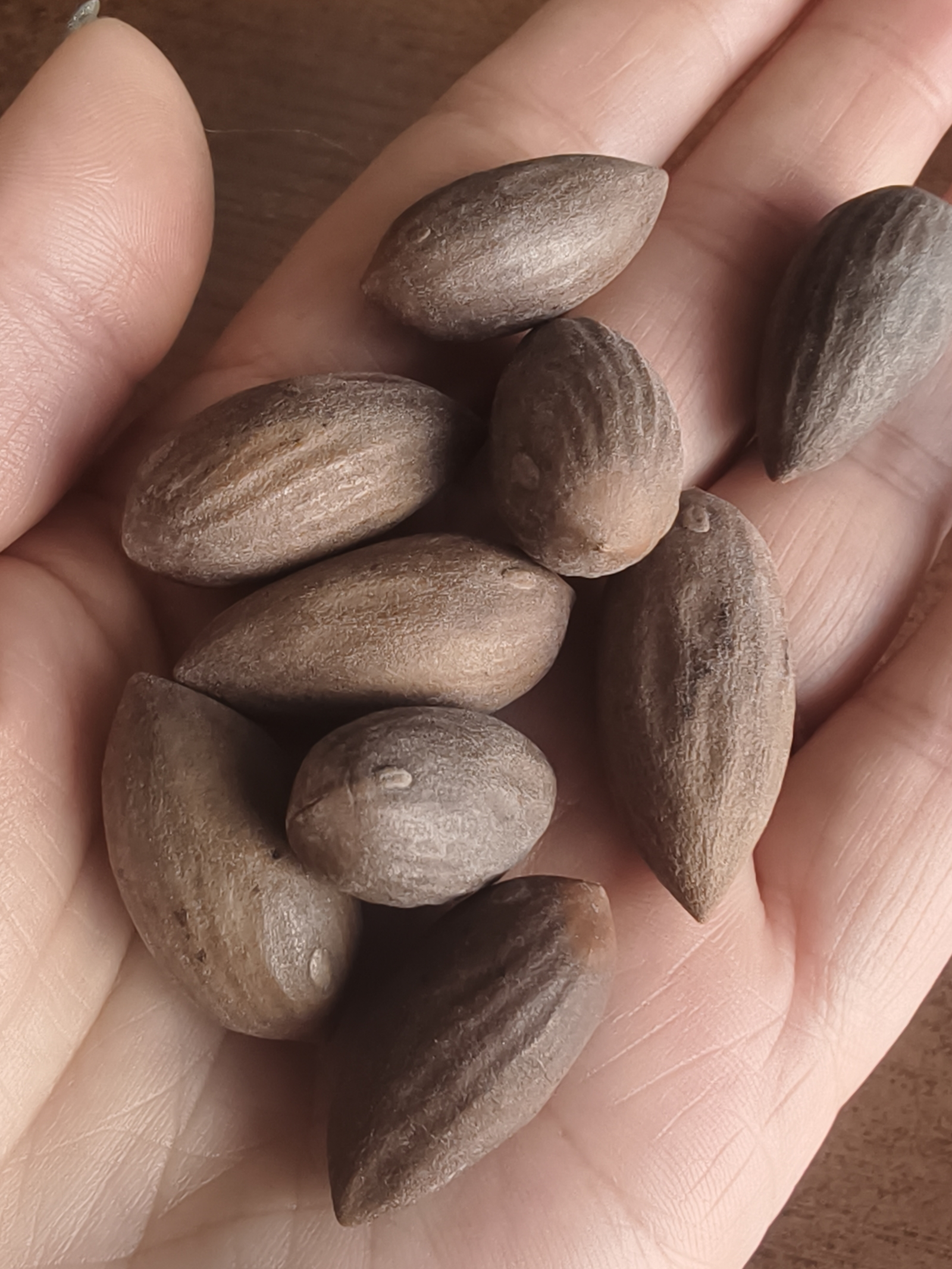
Roasted Torreya grandis nuts

Torreya grandis, Torreya nucifera, Torreya californica, Torreya taxifolia (edible but not typically eaten due to being critically endangered)

== Gnetum nuts ==
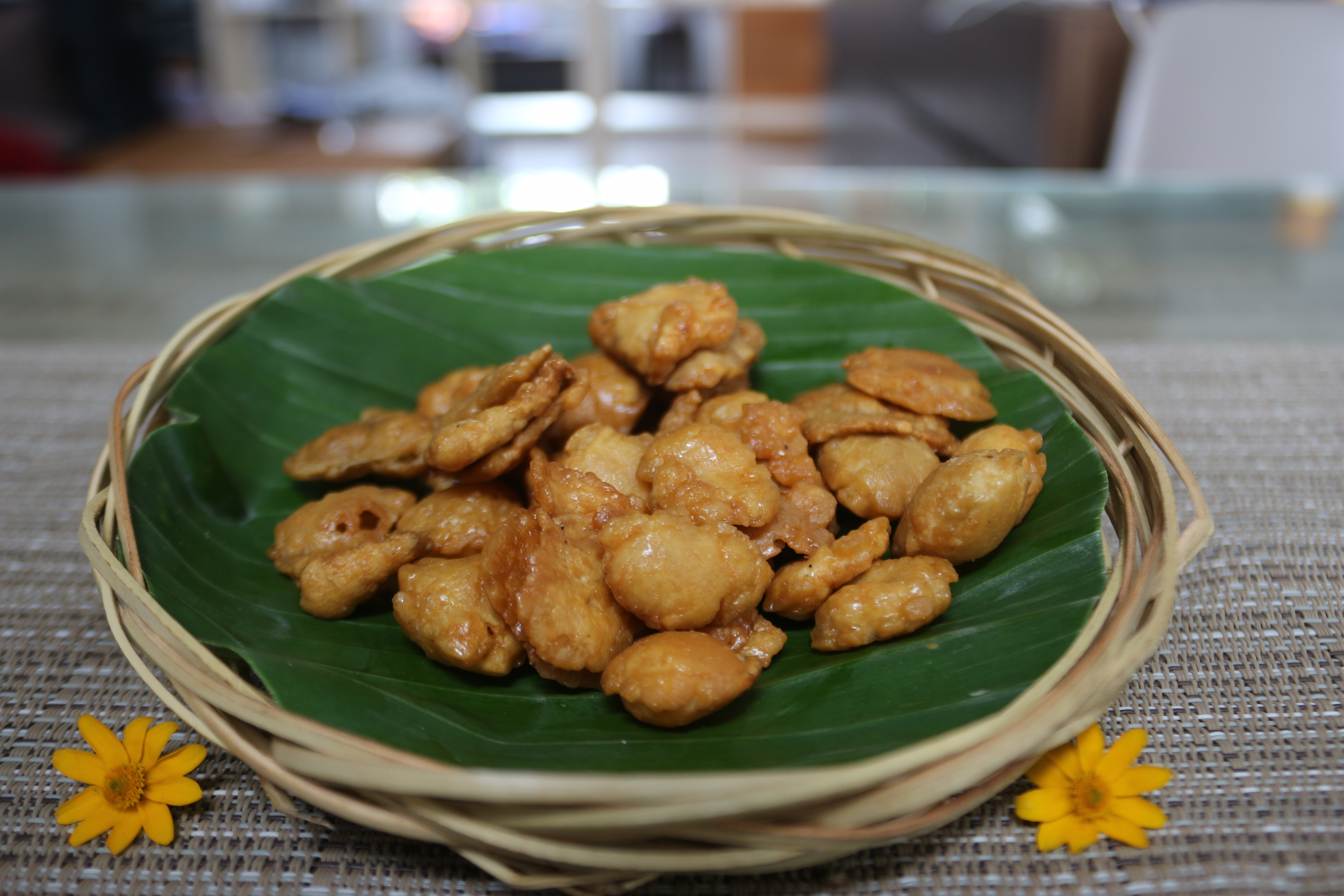
Jaja Melinjo, a traditional Balinese snack food made with Gnetum gnemon nuts

Gnetum gnemon, Gnetum africanum, Gnetum macrostachyum, Gnetum edule

== See also ==
- Conifer cone
- Pinyon pine#Food
