= Torreya fargesii =

Conservation status
- Vulnerable (IUCN 3.1)

Scientific classification
- Kingdom: Plantae
- Clade: Tracheophytes
- Clade: Gymnospermae
- Division: Pinophyta
- Class: Pinopsida
- Order: Cupressales
- Family: Taxaceae
- Genus: Torreya
- Species: T. fargesii

Binomial name
- Torreya fargesii Franch.

Synonyms
- T. grandis var. fargesii

Species of conifer

Torreya fargesii (Farges nutmeg tree, Chinese: 巴山榧树; lit. 'Bashan torreya') is a species of conifer in the family Taxaceae. It is a large tree that can be up to 20 metres (66 ft) tall. It is endemic to central and southern China; it is found in Hubei, Hunan, Jiangxi, Shaanxi, Sichuan, and Yunnan provinces, and possibly in Anhui. It occurs in coniferous, mixed, and broad-leaved forests at altitudes 1,000–3,400 metres (3,300–11,200 ft) ASL. The seeds can be pressed for oil. The wood is used in construction and furniture.

The Latin specific epithet fargesii refers to the French missionary and amateur botanist Père Paul Guillaume Farges (1844–1912).
