= Torreya jackii =

Conservation status
- Endangered (IUCN 3.1)

Scientific classification
- Kingdom: Plantae
- Clade: Tracheophytes
- Clade: Gymnospermae
- Division: Pinophyta
- Class: Pinopsida
- Order: Cupressales
- Family: Taxaceae
- Genus: Torreya
- Species: T. jackii

Binomial name
- Torreya jackii Chun

Species of conifer

Torreya jackii (Chinese: 长叶榧树; pinyin: fěishù; lit. 'longleaf torreya') is a species of conifer in the family Taxaceae. Common names include Jack's nutmeg tree, longleaf torreya, Jack torreya, and weeping torreya. It is endemic to eastern China, in Zhejiang, Fujian, and Jiangxi provinces.

It can be up to 12 metres (39 ft) tall.

It is threatened by habitat loss and logging.
