= Japanese Torreya of Samin-ri =

Protected tree

Coordinates: 34°42′53″N 126°49′9″E

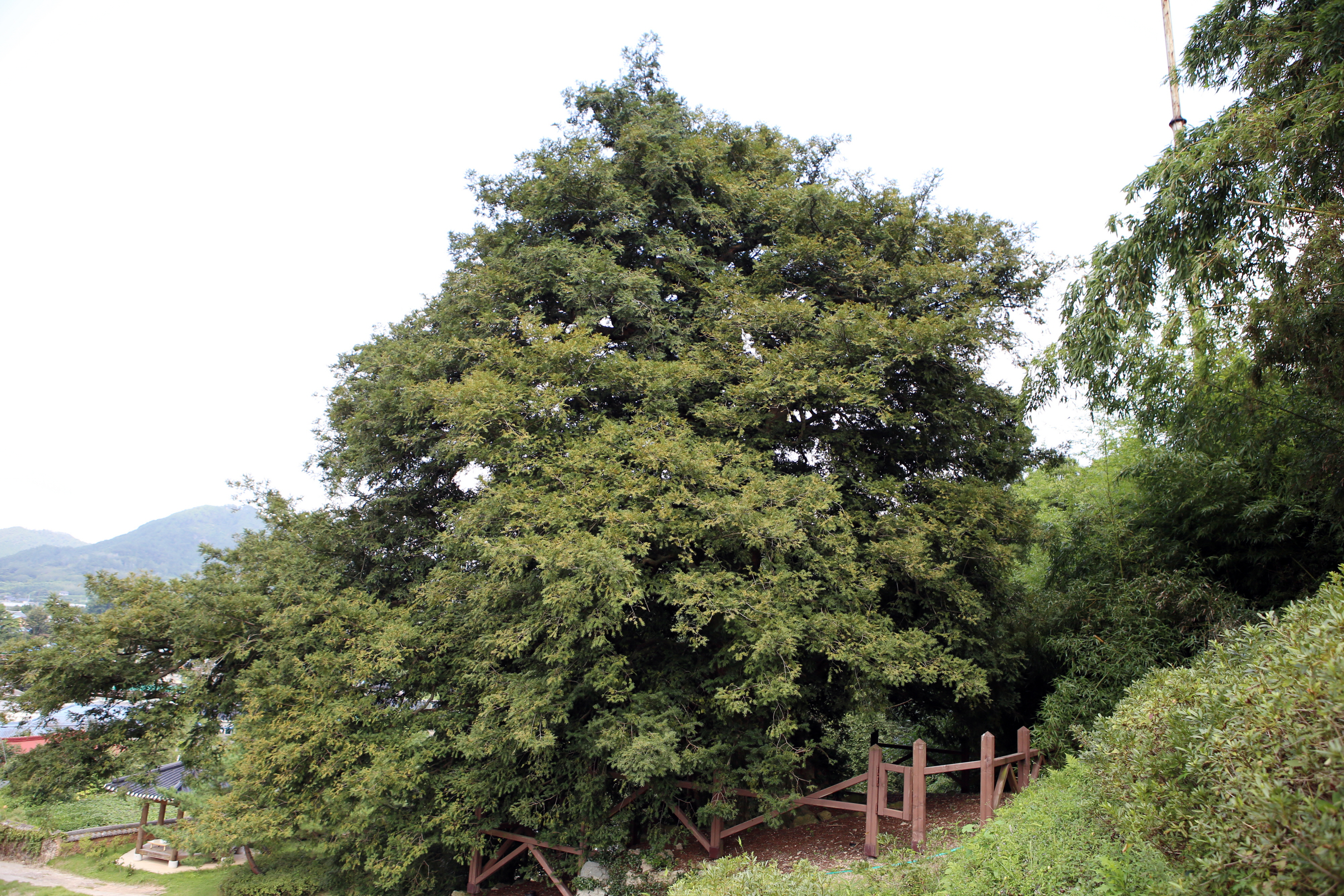
Torreya nucifera of Samin-ri

The Japanese Torreya of Samin-ri (Korean: 강진 삼인리 비자나무) is a protected tree located on the south slope of Mount Naejangsan in Samin-ri, Gangjin, South Korea. The tree belongs to the Torreya nucifera species and is c. 500 years old. It was designated a natural monument in 1962. Before April 2008, it was known as the Torreya tree of Byeongyeong-myeon.

== Description ==
The specimen in Samin-ri, Gangjin-gun is about 500 years old and measures 11.5 m in height and 5.8 m in circumference. Approximately 1.5 m from the ground, the stem splits into four smaller branches. The area below is reinforced with stone retaining walls, but the remaining root space is now very small.

== History ==
Two theories attempt to explain how this tree avoided being harvested for lumber for approximately 500 years.

The area surrounding the tree was home to an army garrison established by King Taejong (r. 1400–1418) that was in existence until 1894. In 1417, people living in the area cut down all the trees that could be used to build the headquarters of the lieutenant general, but this one torreya was too small at that time and was slightly bent. Since it had no use as architectural lumber, it was ignored.

A second theory is that this tree's fruit was a remedy to treat parasitic infections. The villages and people near the tree protected it. The people from Samin-ri now consider this tree to be the guardian of the town and hold an annual celebration on 15 January where they parade around the tree, praying for peace. The tree can also serve as a refuge from the heat of the summer. Due to its careful preservation, historical and cultural value, the tree became a natural monument on 7 December 1962.

== Other references ==
- 문화재청, 《문화재이야기여행 천연기념물 100선》, pp147–152, 31 March 2016
