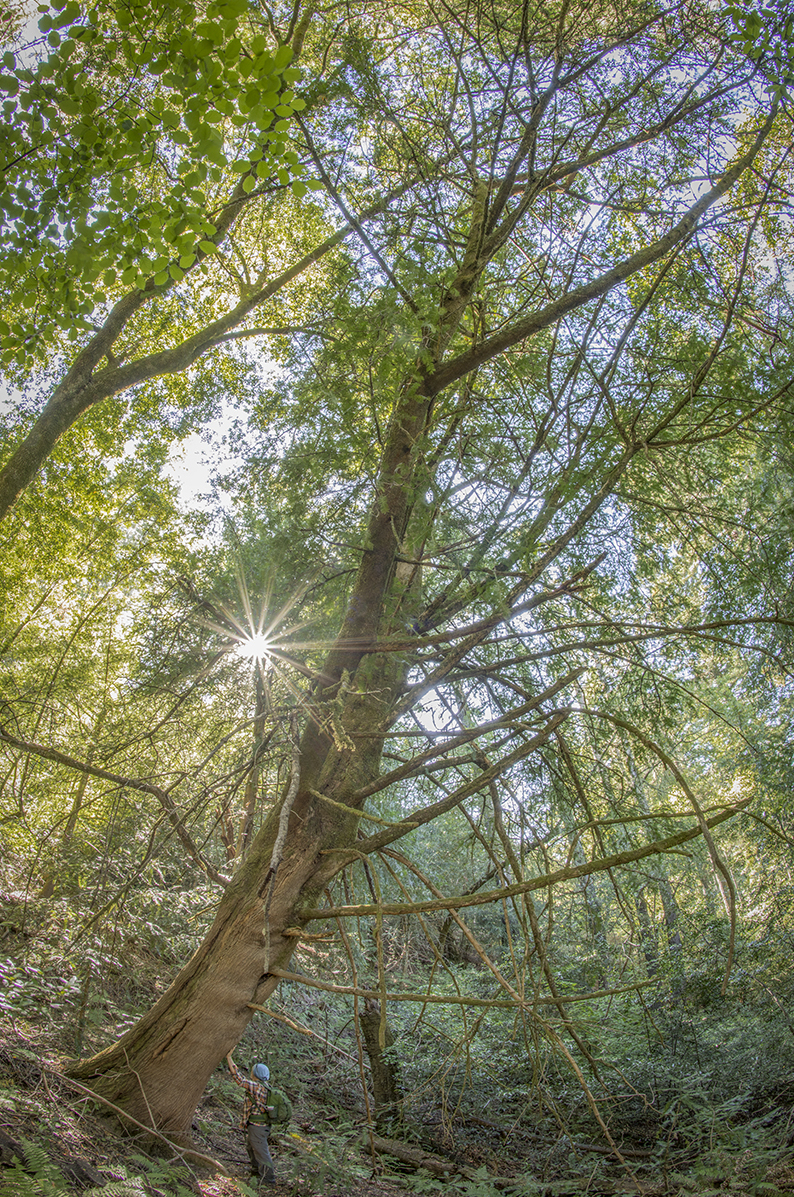
- A champion-scale tree at Samuel Taylor State Park north of San Francisco (person for scale)

Conservation status
- Vulnerable (IUCN 3.1)

Scientific classification
- Kingdom: Plantae
- Clade: Tracheophytes
- Clade: Gymnospermae
- Division: Pinophyta
- Class: Pinopsida
- Order: Cupressales
- Family: Taxaceae
- Genus: Torreya
- Species: T. californica

Binomial name
- Torreya californica Torr.
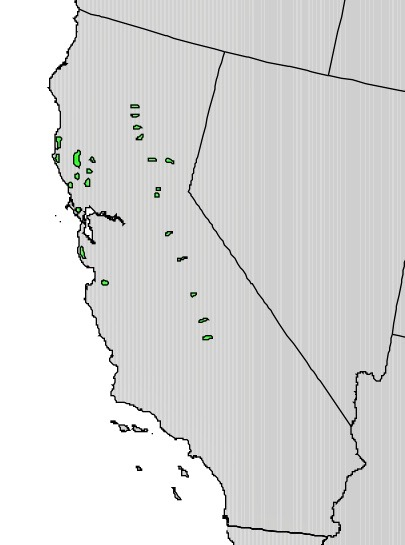
- Natural range

= Torreya californica =

Species of conifer

Torreya californica is a species of conifer endemic to California, occurring in the Pacific Coast Ranges and the foothills of the Sierra Nevada. It is commonly known as California torreya or California nutmeg tree (although not closely related to true nutmeg). It is one of only two species of genus Torreya that are native to North America. A slow-growing (but long-lived) subcanopy tree, it is listed as "vulnerable" in the IUCN Red List.

== Description ==
California torreya is an evergreen tree growing to 15–27 metres (49–89 ft) tall, with a trunk diameter of 0.5–1 m (1 1/2–3 1/2 ft), exceptionally 2 m. In full sun, the crown is conical in overall shape, with whorled branches. But in subcanopy shade, the tree may grow leaning and sometimes multi-stem.

The species has a taproot. The bark is thin, from 0.8–1.3 cm on mature trees. The leaves are needle-like, stiff, sharp-pointed, 3–8 cm (1–3 in) long and persisting for many years. They are arranged spirally, but twisted at the base to lie flat either side of the shoots.

As with all species of Torreya, the male (pollen) cones are 5–7 mm long, grouped in lines along the underside of a shoot. The female (seed) cones are single or grouped two to five together near the end of a short stem and require about 18 months to mature into a drupe-like structure with the single large nut-like seed 2.5–4 cm long. The seed is surrounded by a fleshy covering that becomes dark green to purple at full maturity in late autumn.

On serpentine rock, California torreya becomes a stunted tree or shrub and occurs only on north-facing slopes in coastal chaparral.

It is capable of resprouting following disturbance such as fire, although regrowth is slow.

== Etymology ==
Torreya is named for Dr. John Torrey (1796–1873), an American botanist who contributed to the Flora of North America.

Californica means 'from California'.

== Distribution and habitat ==
The altitudinal range of T. californica is from near sea level (but usually above 200 m) in the Coast Ranges to 2,500 m (8,200 ft) in the Sierra Nevada. This shade-adapted, subcanopy tree is native to mountainous habitats in either the California Coast Ranges or the west slopes of the Cascade and Sierra Nevada mountain ranges in California, which are distant from the coast. In the Coast Ranges, it is distributed from southwest Trinity County south to Monterey County. In the interior mountain ranges, it is distributed from Shasta County south to Tulare County.

Mountainous terrain affords this narrowly dispersed ancient conifer opportunities to track suitable microclimates by shifting altitude and local topography, along with shifts between northerly (cool) and southerly (warm) slope aspects or deep ravines and canyons, while remaining on the same mountain. Short distance adjustments are crucial for this genus, as squirrels and humans seem to be the most active agents for seed dispersal.

The patchiness of its geographic range is a form of disjunct distribution. The species is considered to be rare, but wherever it is found in the wild it may be locally abundant. This pattern of distribution is suggestive of a relict taxon that has had difficulties navigating episodes of climate change in which range shifts had to occur in topographically complex landscapes. A sister species in eastern North America, Florida torreya, was reduced to only a single population owing to episodes of climate change during the Quaternary glaciation. Its status as a glacial relict was recognized in its listing as an endangered species.

Range shifts would have been difficult for all species of genus Torreya. Rodents are the only abundant and dependable seed dispersers — yet they gather and cache the large seeds only short distances.

== Ecology ==
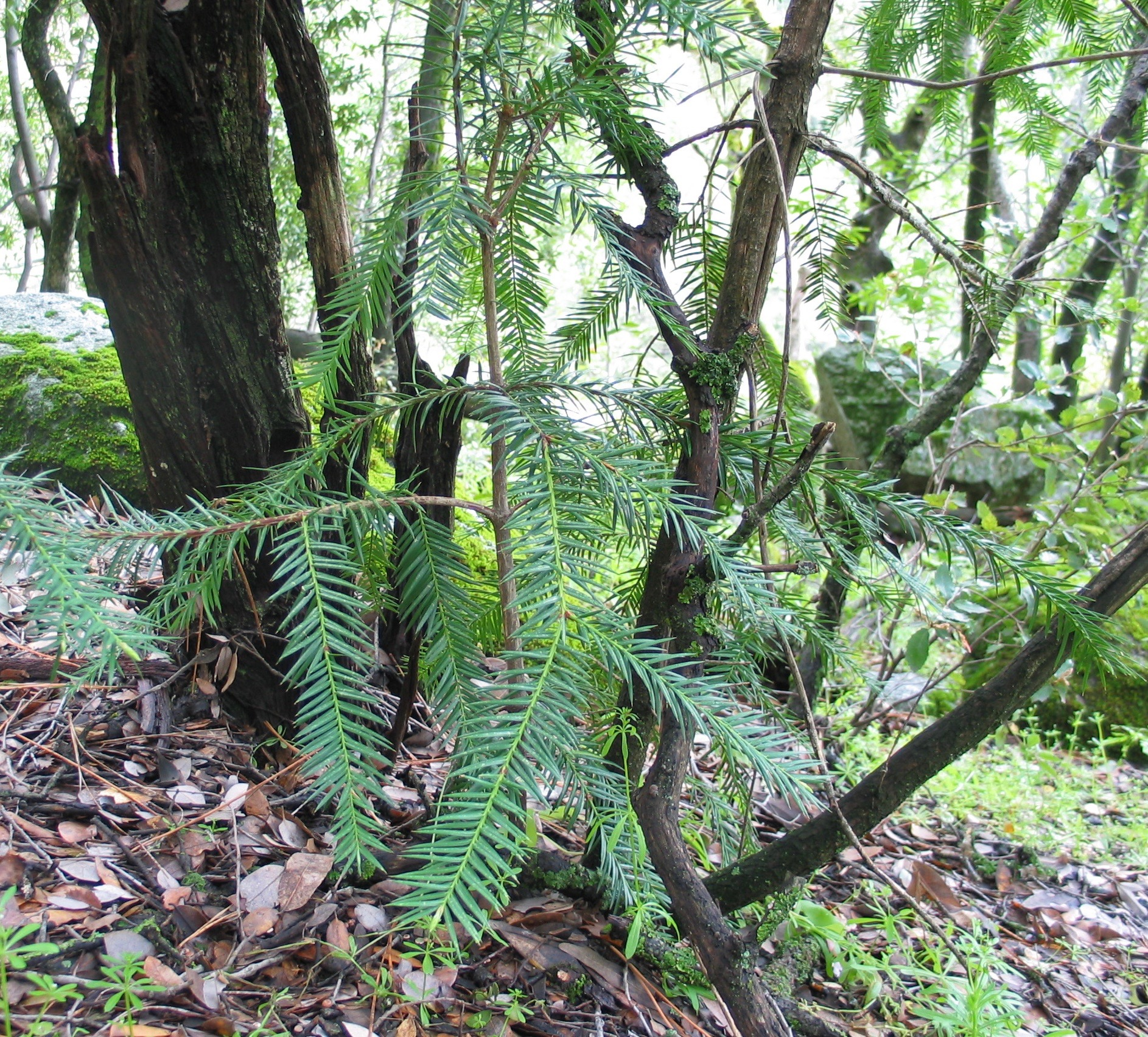
Torreya adopts the usual yew-like form in Sequoia National Park.

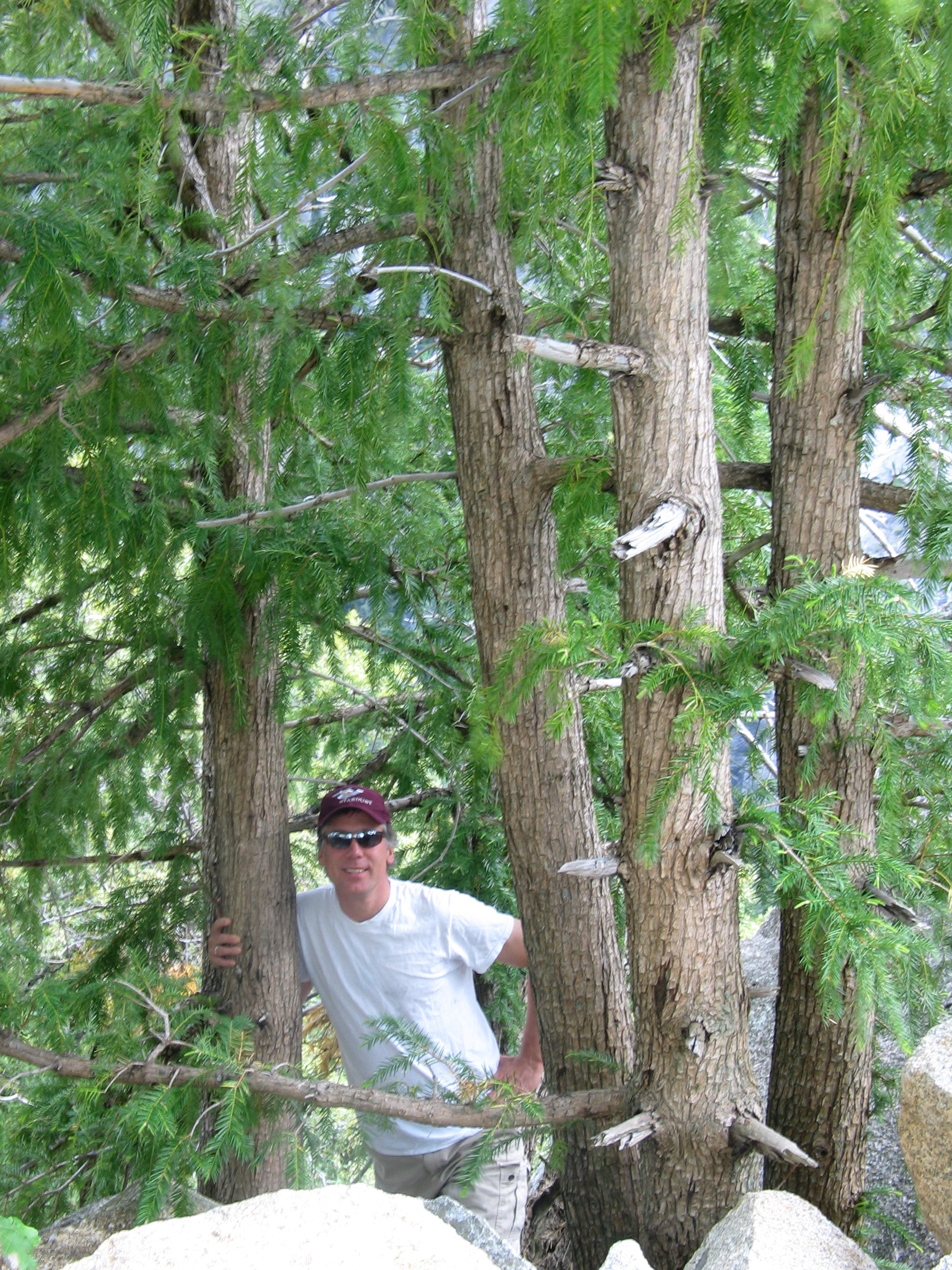
Road-building in Yosemite National Park induced vertical growth.

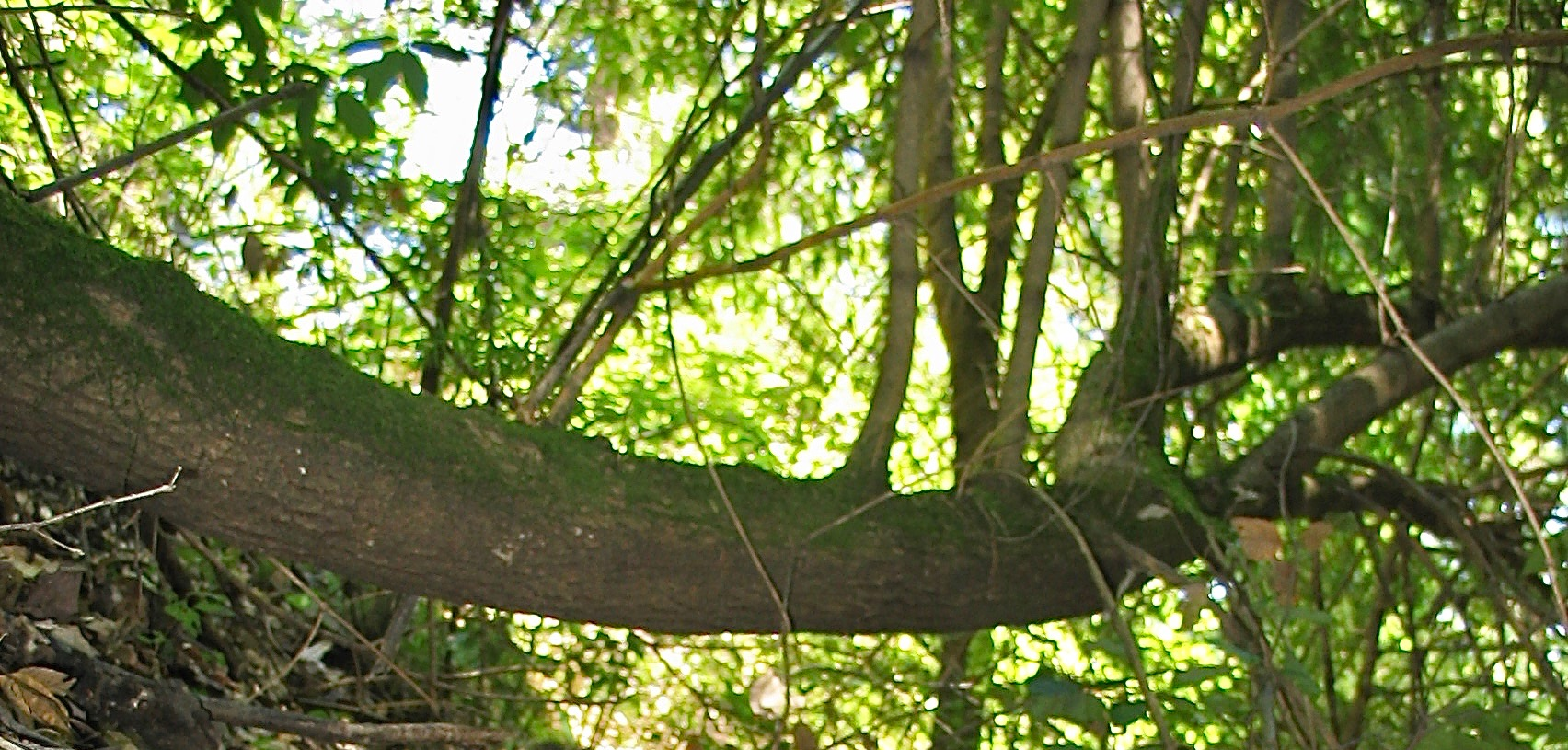
In the Coast Range north of Napa Valley, shade can be dense. On this steep slope in a narrow ravine, a torreya stem leans horizontally, with branches growing directly upward to access sunlight.

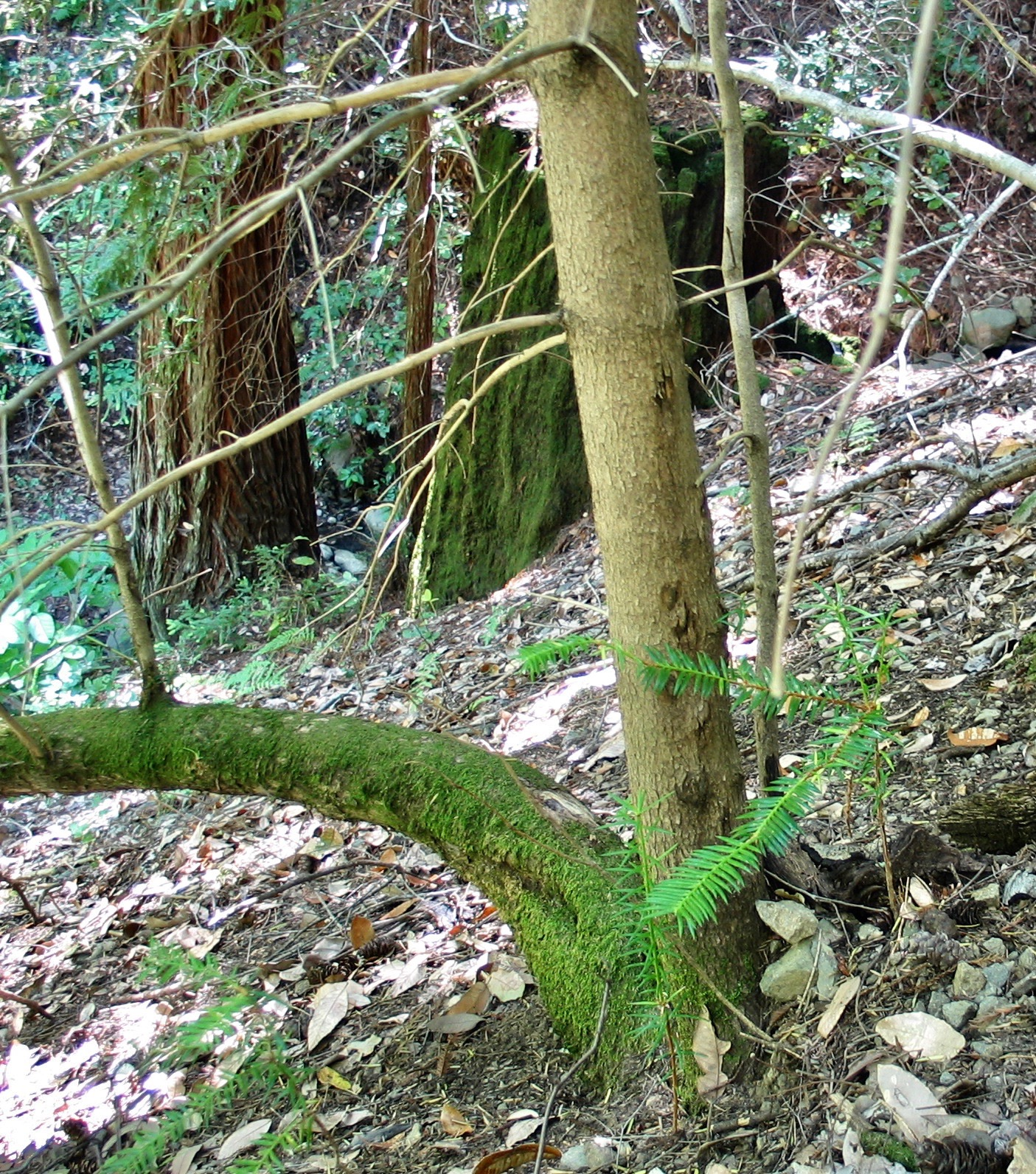
A mossy trunk and shoots. Coast Redwood trunks visible in background.

Torreya species are all adapted to establish and grow slowly as subcanopy woody plants in forest habitats of moderate to dense shade. In this way, their leaf structure and growth habit resemble species of yew, genus Taxus, which is a close relative.

Torreya species are found in late seral and climax communities. Owing to their ability to resprout from the root crown after logging or mild fire, the species will experience growth opportunities in the early stages of regrowth forest habitats.

When a tree-fall opens the forest canopy (or if nearby roadbuilding occurs), then upward growth will be stimulated.

Stems will lean in very shady conditions, in quest of patches of sunlight. Extremely leaning stems within a shady subcanopy gather moss as they age. An old leaning stem that fails to access sunlight will perish, but not before the long-lived root crown has given rise to one or more younger stems searching for sunlight in different directions.

Seed production occurs on female branches (and trees) only in the presence of direct sunlight. Because the Torreya genus has very long-lived roots, it can continue slow growth, while replenishing basal stems, for many decades without seed production becoming crucial for the persistence of a local population.

=== Threats ===
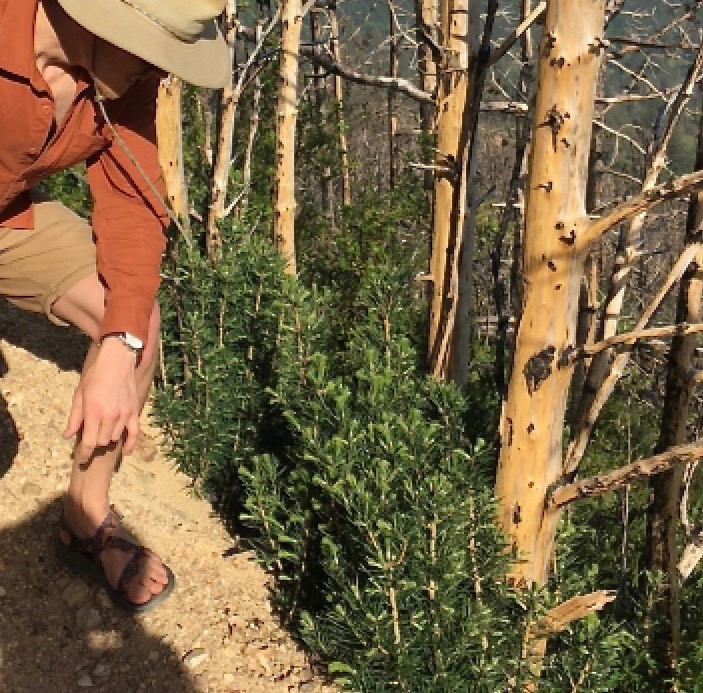
A tree resprouts after wildfire killed its main stems (yellow), but not their root crowns, in California's Stevenson State Park (2019)

The IUCN Red List bases its assessment of "vulnerable" in this way:

"Past logging has virtually eliminated Torreya californica from parts of its historic range and also removed most of the large trees across almost all of its range. Regrowth is reported to be very slow. On this basis a past decline of more than 50% of mature trees in the population has been inferred over the past 150 years (three generations), leading to an assessment of Vulnerable under the A1 criterion.... Logging in the late 19th and up to the mid 20th centuries virtually eliminated California Nutmeg from the Vaca Mountains of Napa and Solano counties, and considerably reduced populations in the Santa Cruz Mountains and lower Russian River area of Sonoma County (Howard 1992). Logging also eliminated many of the larger trees in the remainder of its range and resulted in a decline of mature trees in the total population, which is only now slowly being restored. As this species is dependent on forest cover, deforestation in parts of California has further contributed to a decline. On this basis it is reasonable to infer an historic decline in the number of mature trees of at least 50%. This decline has now ceased or virtually ceased."

The "severe fragmentation" of the population was also listed as a risk element for the species. Wildfire, however, was not mentioned as one of the risks. Perhaps this is because the most recent IUCN assessment is listed as April 2011 — just before the extraordinary increase in the scale and intensity of California wildfires.

== Champion trees ==
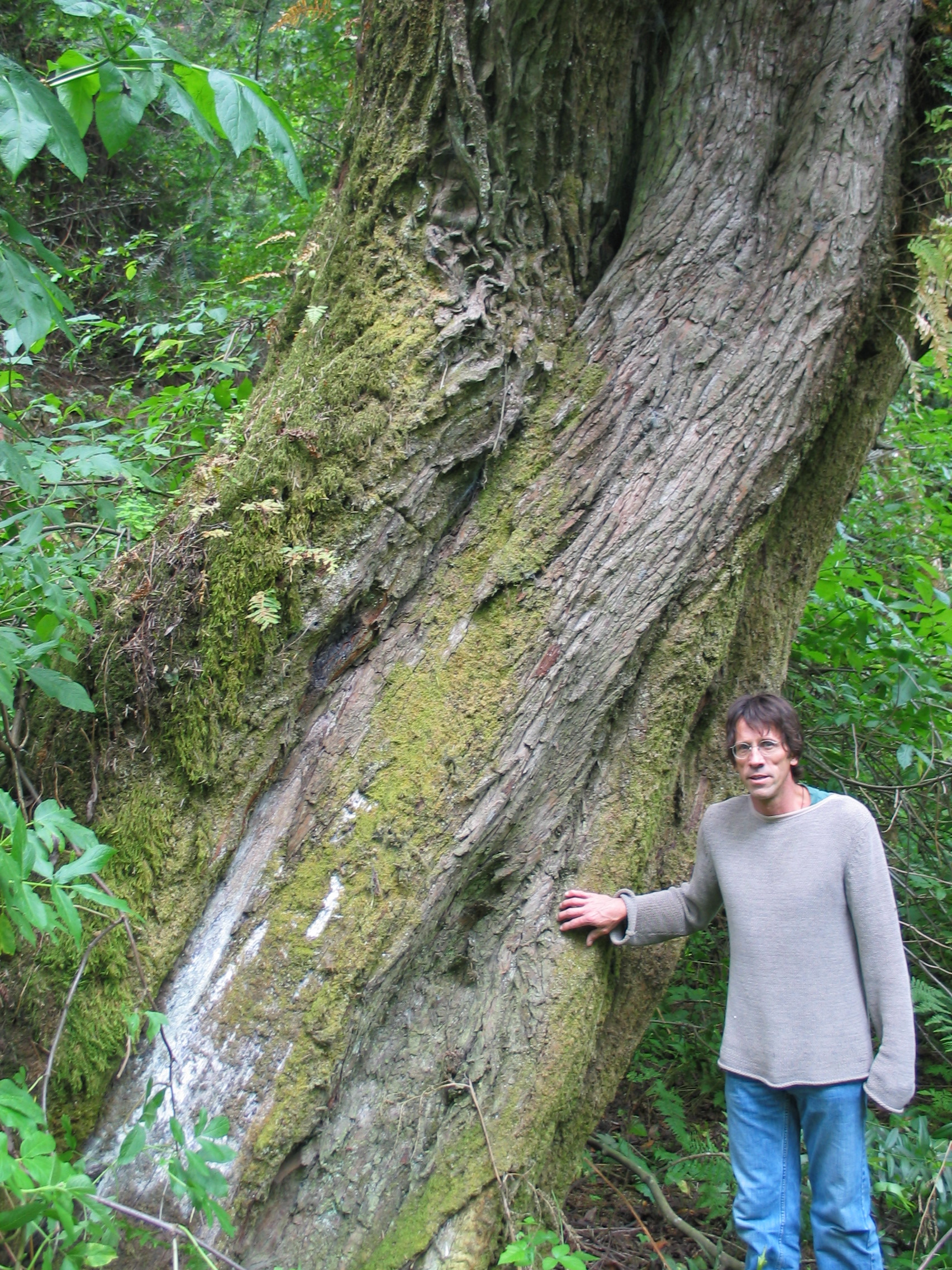
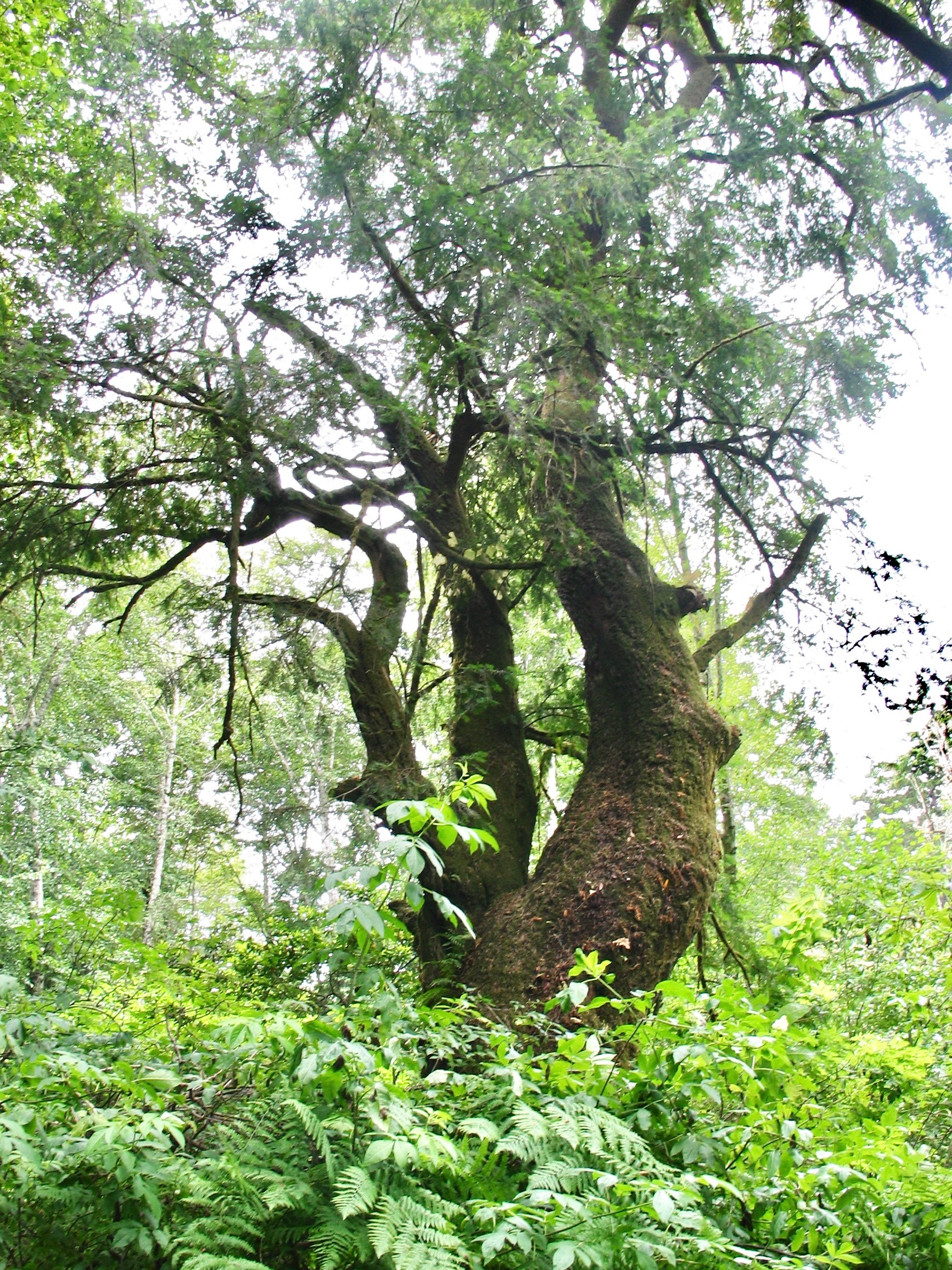
In 2005, then-champion California torreya tree was already showing signs of decline in its moss-covered trunk and multi-stem top, by Scott Creek north of Santa Cruz.

Champion trees are compared by a total of three measurements: trunk circumference, height, and crown spread. Hence, when the crown seriously deteriorates, a champion can lose its status even before death.

The earliest recorded "champion" torreya grew near Fort Bragg in Mendocino County. It measured 43 meters in height and 4.5 meters in diameter, but it was cut by timber thieves. Ring counts of the remnants left by the thieves yielded an age of 236 years old. However, the center was rotted out, so an estimate had to be made. The likely age (reported by Frank Callahan) was thus between 275 and 286 years.

As of 2005, the champion tree was along Scott Creek north of Santa Cruz. Lee Klinger (shown for scale in the photo) measured that tree's circumference: 6.4 meters. It was already showing signs of decline, including moss indicative of very slow growth on the multiple stems of its crown and on its trunk.

In 2014 a new champion was nominated and named, still in the Santa Cruz Mountains. Its trunk circumference was only 3.4 meters, but it was healthy and had a height of 32 meters and a crown spread of 18 meters.

== Uses ==
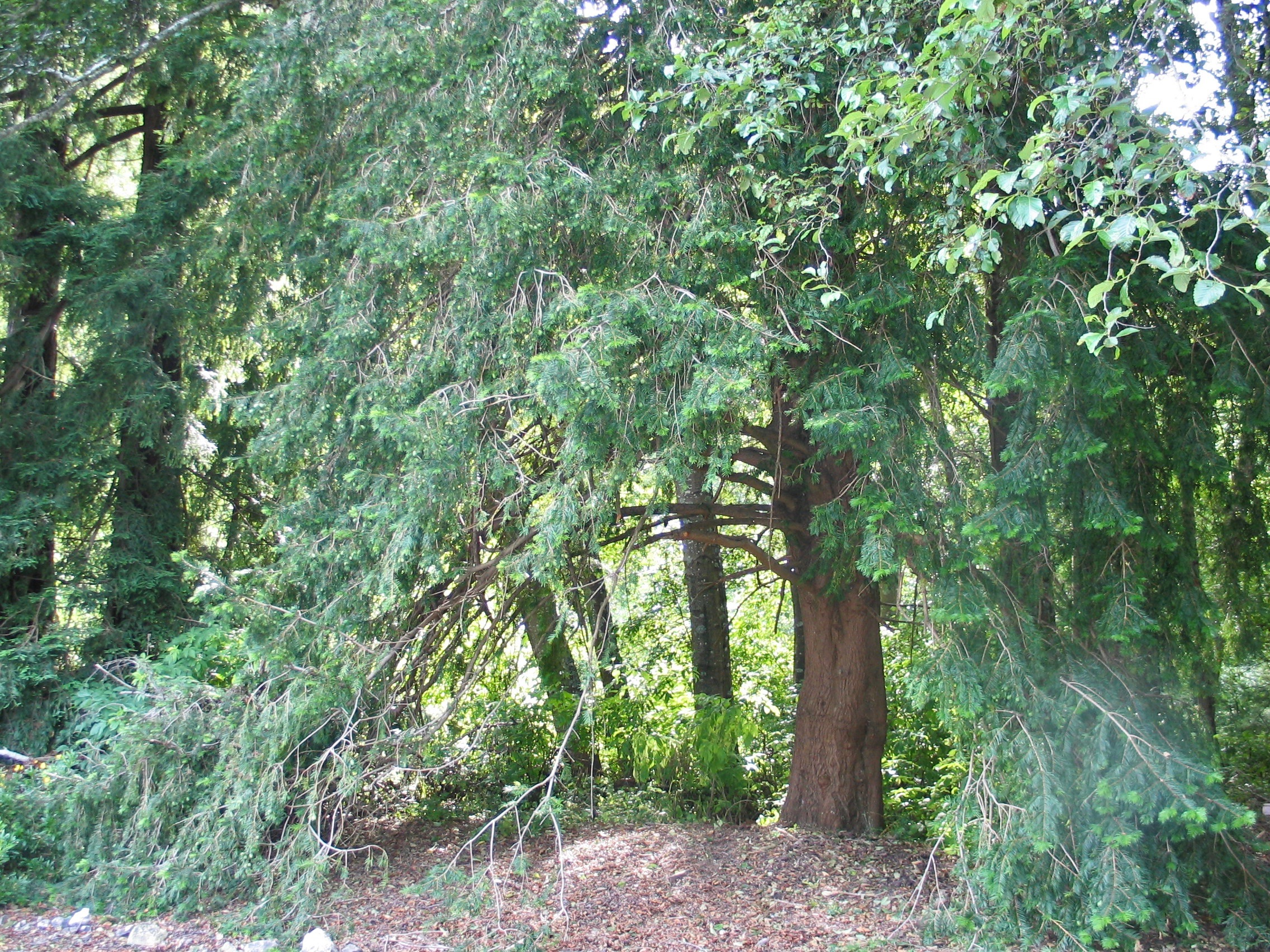
A torreya tree (thick, auburn trunk) has a huge crop of seeds from decades of full sun. Scott Creek, Santa Cruz.

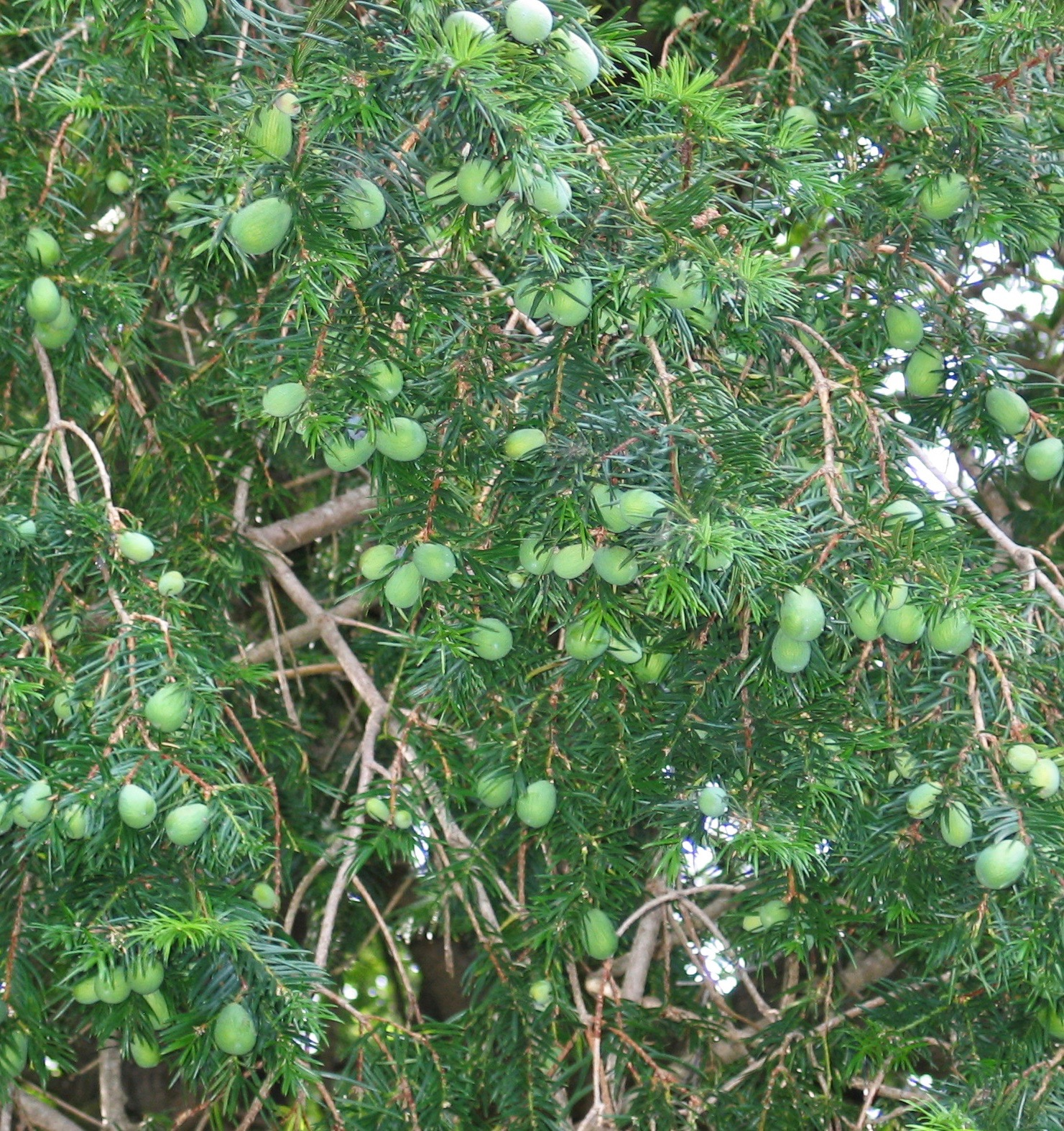
Close-up of a seed-rich branch. Scott Creek, 2005.

Commercial harvesting of California nutmeg is almost nonexistent due to scant availability. It was logged on a limited basis in the past, especially where growing in association with coast redwood, but was never an important timber species.

The fine-grained, yellow-brown wood is highly durable. It is strong and elastic, smooth in texture, polishes well, and emits a fragrance similar to that of sandalwood. The wood is sometimes used in making Go game boards, as a cheaper substitute for the prized kaya (Torreya nucifera) of Japan and Southeast Asia.

The seeds were once mentioned in pharmacognostic literature under the Latin name nux moschata Californica.

The seeds were reportedly a highly valued food of Indigenous peoples in California, though they are inedible raw. Additionally, the roots were used for making baskets and the wood for making bows.
