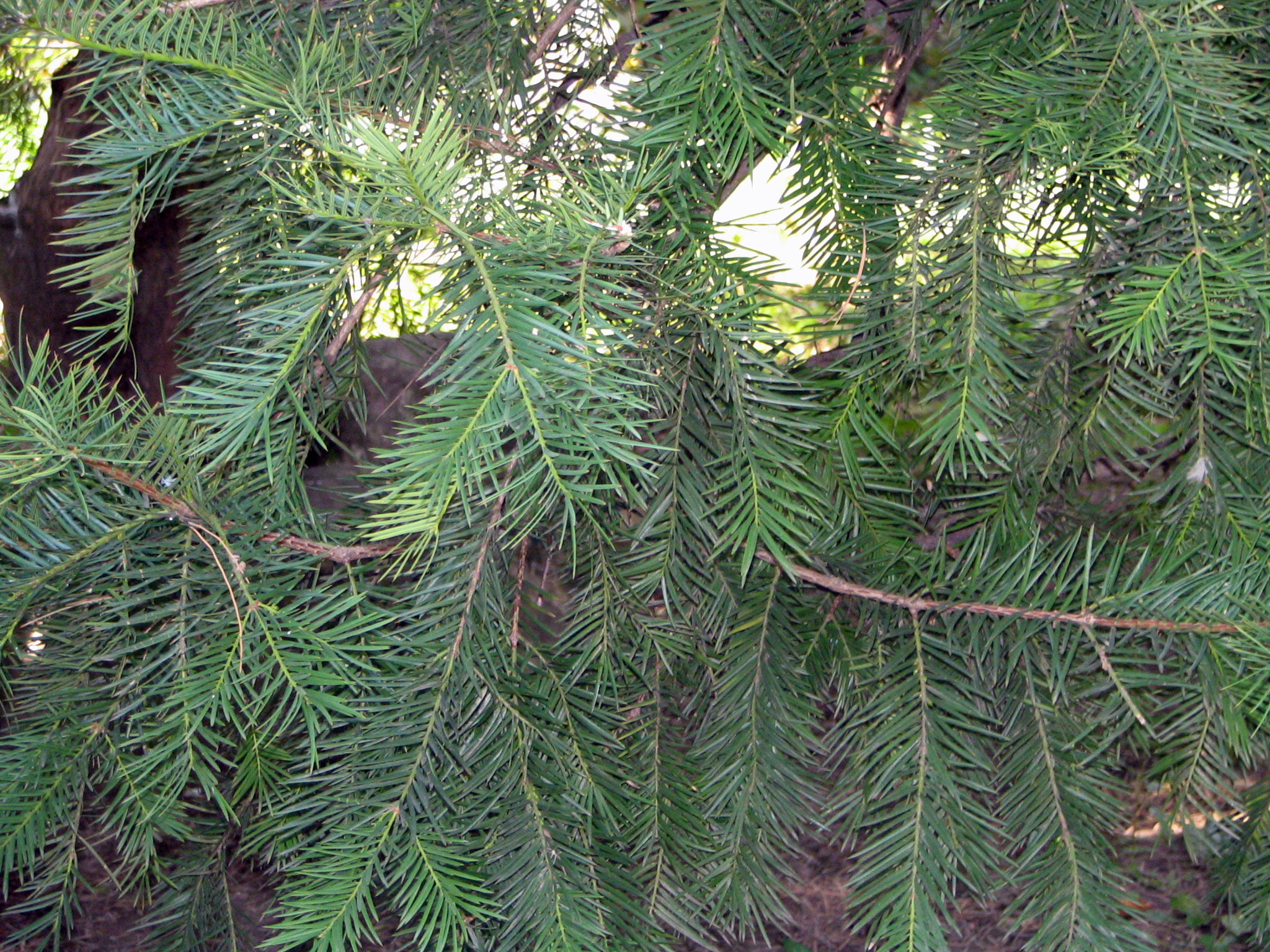
- Torreya nucifera

Scientific classification
- Kingdom: Plantae
- Clade: Tracheophytes
- Clade: Gymnosperms
- Division: Pinophyta
- Class: Pinopsida
- Order: Cupressales
- Family: Taxaceae
- Genus: Torreya; Arn.

Type species
- Torreya taxifolia Arn.

Species
- see text

Synonyms
- Caryotaxus Zuccarini ex Henkel & Hochstetter; Foetataxus Nelson; Tumion Raf. ex Greene

= Torreya =

Torreya Temporal range: Early Cretaceous–Recent 125.8MYA–0

Genus of conifers

Torreya is a genus of conifers comprising six or seven species placed in the family Taxaceae, though sometimes formerly placed in Cephalotaxaceae. Four species are native to eastern Asia; the other two are native to North America. They are small to medium-sized trees reaching 5–20 m, rarely 25 m, tall. Common names include nutmeg yew.

The genus is one example of the Arcto-Tertiary Geoflora in paleoecology. The pattern of highly disjunct distribution of geographic ranges of the species within such a genus spans temperate plant zones of continents in the Northern Hemisphere. This geographic pattern is attributed to genus origins in much warmer times of the Tertiary Period, when zones of temperate climate were found in poleward latitudes whereby land connections facilitated range expansions and migrations of plants between Asia and North America and sometimes between Europe and North America.

The leaves are spirally arranged on the shoots, but twisted at the base to lie in two flat ranks; they are linear, 2–8 cm long and 3–4 mm broad, hard in texture, with a sharp spine tip.

Torreya can be monoecious, dioecious, or subdioecious (documented in Japanese Torreya and Florida Torreya). When monoecious, the male and female cones are often on different branches. The male (pollen) cones are 5–8 mm long, grouped in lines along the underside of a shoot. The female (seed) cones are single or grouped two to eight together on a short stem; minute at first, they mature in about 18 months to a drupe-like structure with the single large nut-like seed 2–4 cm long surrounded by a fleshy covering, green to purple at full maturity.

In some species, notably the Japanese Torreya nucifera ('kaya'), and unusually for members of Taxaceae, the seed is edible. Natural dispersal is thought to be aided by squirrels which bury the seeds for a winter food source; any seeds left uneaten are then able to germinate.

The genus is named after the American botanist John Torrey.

== Fossil record ==
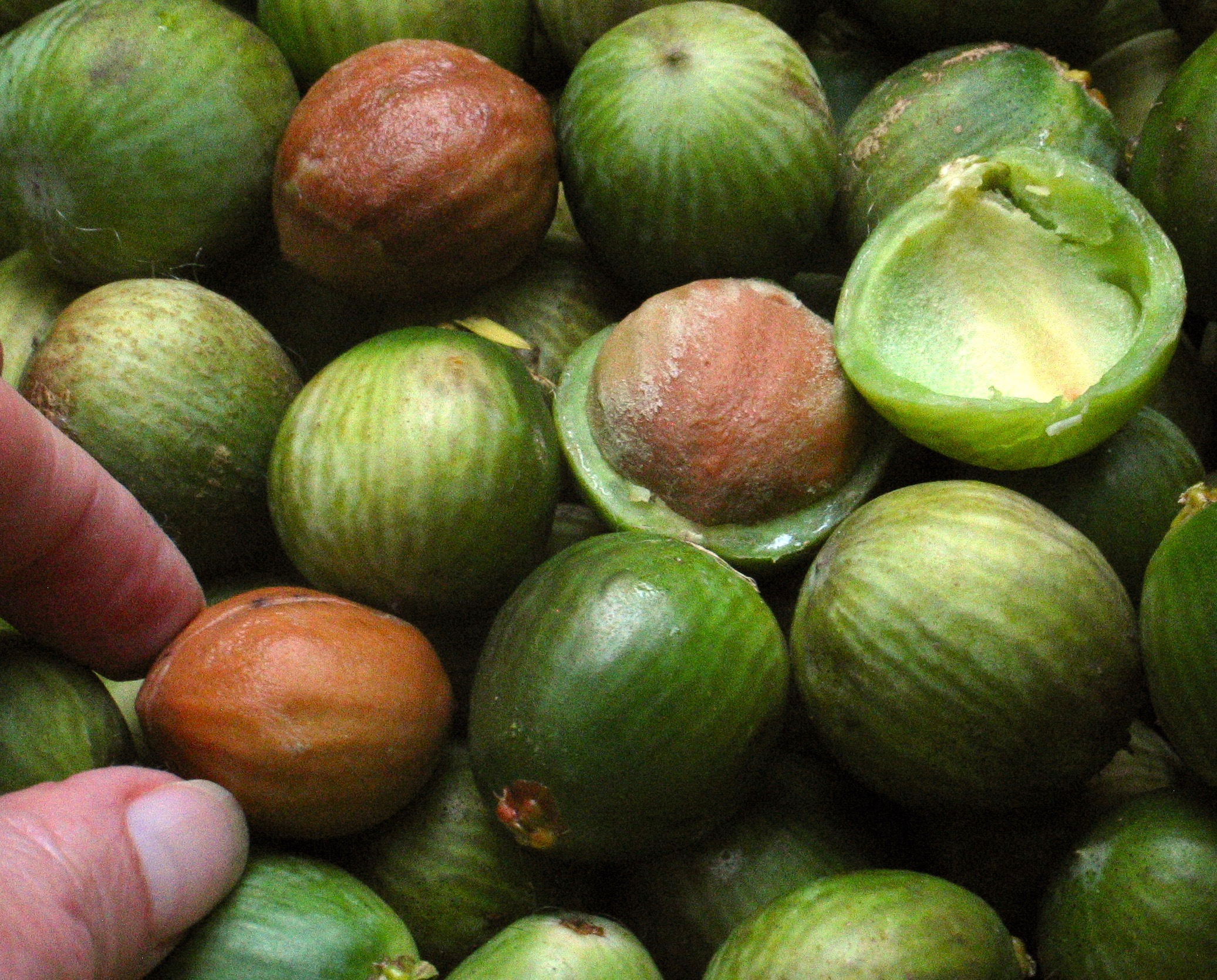
Ripe seeds of Torreya taxifolia

†Torreya clarnensis has been described from Middle Eocene fossils found in the Clarno Formation of Central Oregon, United States. Leafy branch fossils of †Torreya bilinica are known from Oligocene strata of Zichov near Bílina, Czech Republic, early Miocene deposits of Güvem central Anatolia, Turkey and late Miocene deposits of Spain. A single Torreya nucifera needle leaf is known from a late Miocene deposit in Abkhazia. More complete records of Torreya nucifera are known from Pliocene deposits of France. The earliest fossils are known from the Cretaceous.

Fossil pollen of genus Torreya and other genera within Taxaceae is generally deemed indistinguishable, one from another, and also from genera within families Taxodiaceae and Cupressaceae. Therefore, it is generally difficult to support past presence or absence of such genera in geographic locales where macrofossil plant material is rare or absent, even if substantial pollen (as in Quaternary bogs) is available.

== Adaptive growth forms of this subcanopy genus ==
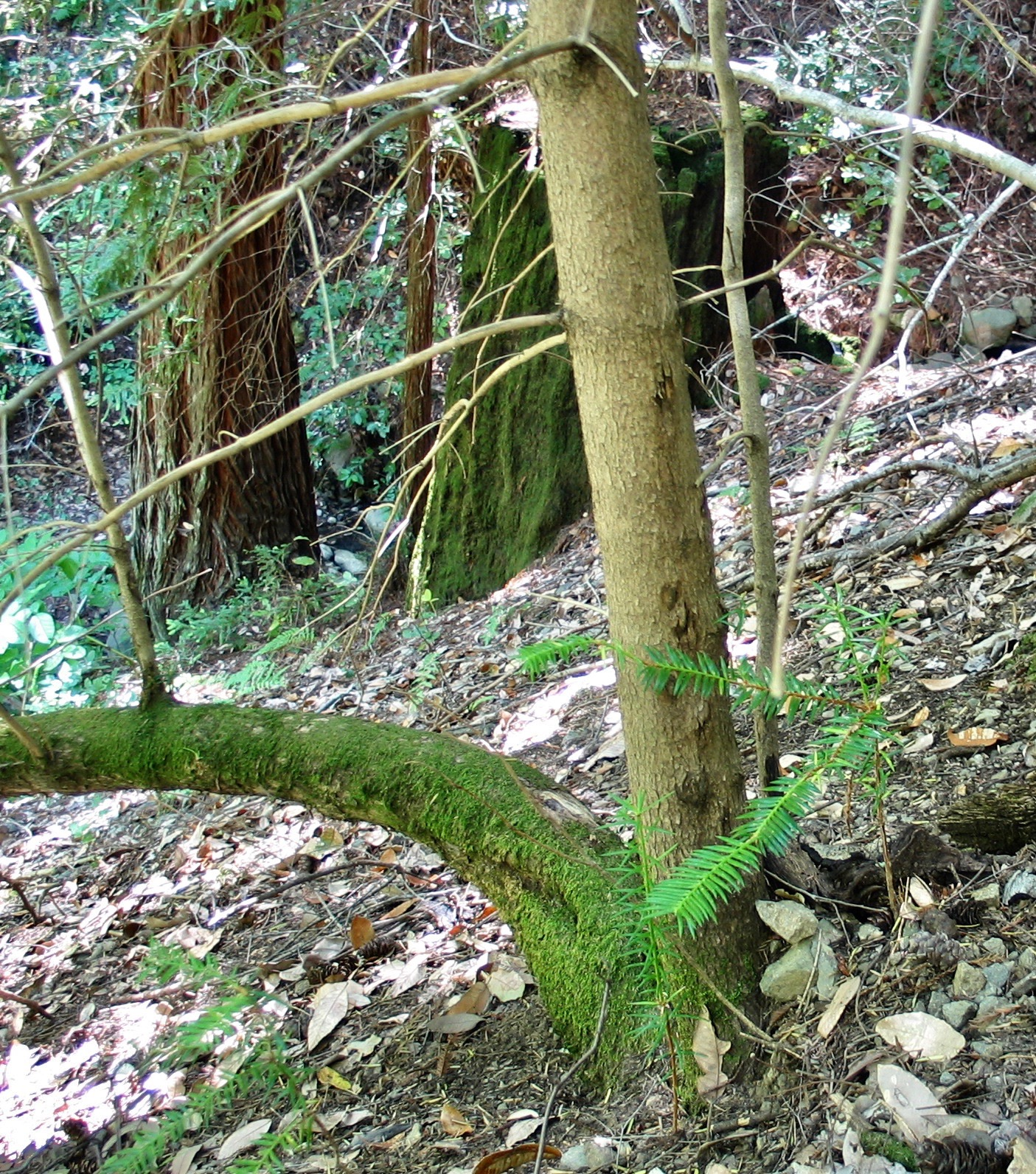
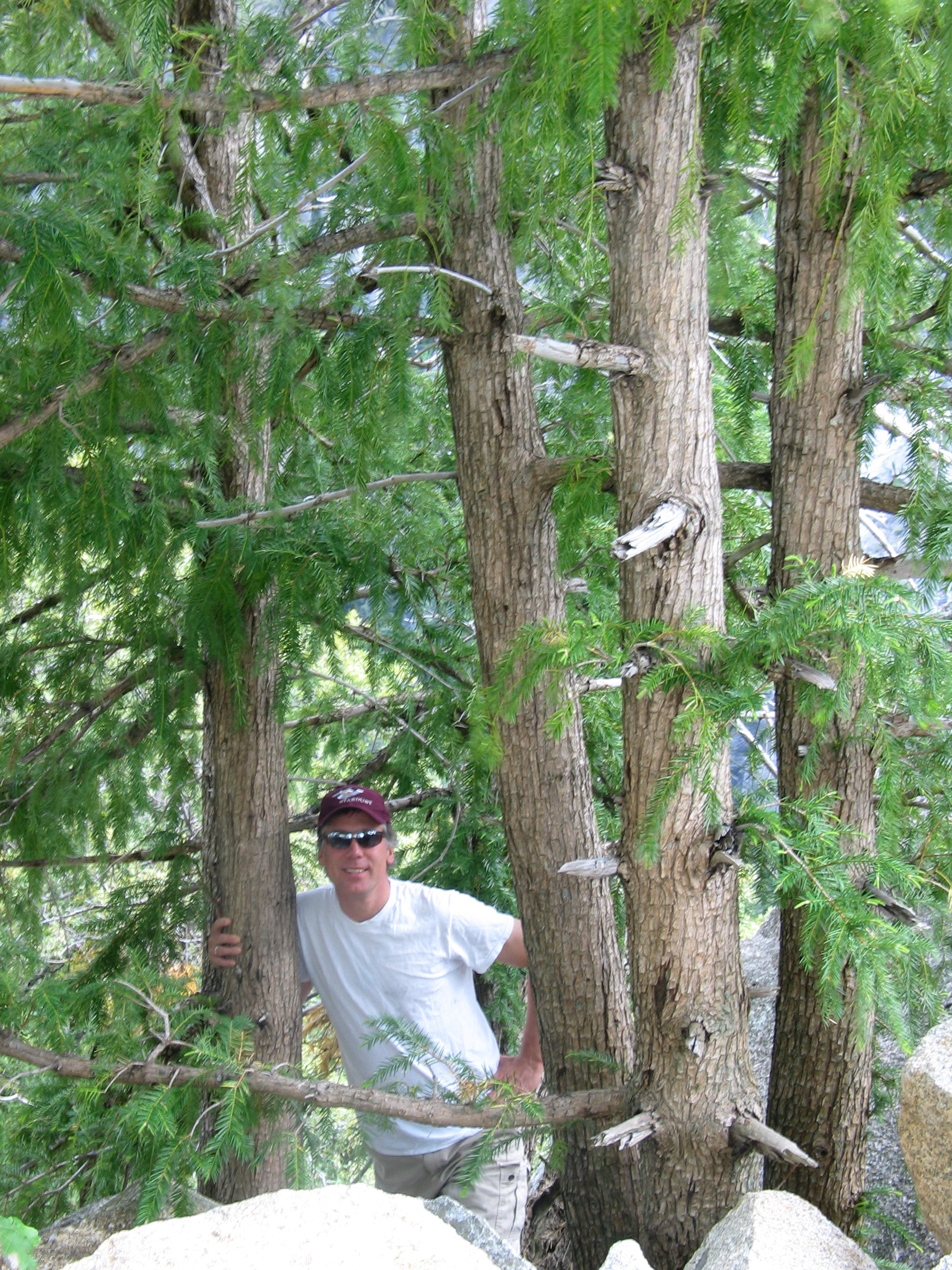
LEFT: Stems of the Torreya species in California extend horizontally and become moss-covered in the shade of Coast redwood canopy. RIGHT: Road-building in Yosemite National Park produced a clearing where vertical growth resumed in this California Torreya.

Species within this genus are all adapted to establish and grow slowly as subcanopy woody plants in forest habitats of moderate to dense shade. Stems will lean in very shady conditions, with branches and additional stems arising from the root crown growing more horizontally than vertically. If and when a canopy opening occurs, upward growth will be stimulated and even the leaf form and orientation will shift.

Seed production occurs on female branches (and trees) only in the presence of direct sunlight. Therefore, wild trees tended and planted trees cultivated for local or market seed consumption in Asia (usually, Torreya grandis) will have their surroundings managed accordingly through human intervention.

== Species ==
Phylogeny of Torreya

- Torreya
  - T. jackii Chun
  - - T. nucifera (von Linné) Siebold & Zuccarini
    - - T. taxifolia Arnott
      - - T. californica Torrey
        - - T. grandis Fortune ex Lindley
          - - T. parvifolia Yi, Yang & Long
            - T. fargesii Franchet

Image	Scientific name	Common name	Distribution	Description
	Torreya californica	California torreya	California, USA	It is the largest of the two species in North America.
	Torreya fargesii	Farges nutmeg tree	China: Hubei, Hunan, Jiangxi, Shaanxi, Sichuan, and Yunnan provinces, and possibly in Anhui	
	Torreya grandis	Chinese nutmeg yew	China: Fujian, Zhejiang, Jiangsu, Anhui, Guizhou, Hunan, and Jiangxi	Cultivated extensively for its edible seed, and as an ornamental plant.
	Torreya jackii	Jack's nutmeg tree, longleaf torreya, Jack torreya, and weeping torreya	China, in Zhejiang, Fujian, and Jiangxi provinces	
	Torreya nucifera	kaya, Japanese torreya, or Japanese nutmeg-yew.	southern Japan and to South Korea's Jeju Island	
	Torreya taxifolia	Florida torreya or gopher wood	restricted habitat within Torreya State Park, along the east bank of the Apalachicola River in the Florida Panhandle and immediately adjacent southernmost Georgia	Limited to its peak glacial refuge, this species became the type example of "assisted species migration" for climate-endangered forest trees when a citizen group, Torreya Guardians, began planting it more than 600 kilometers poleward.
