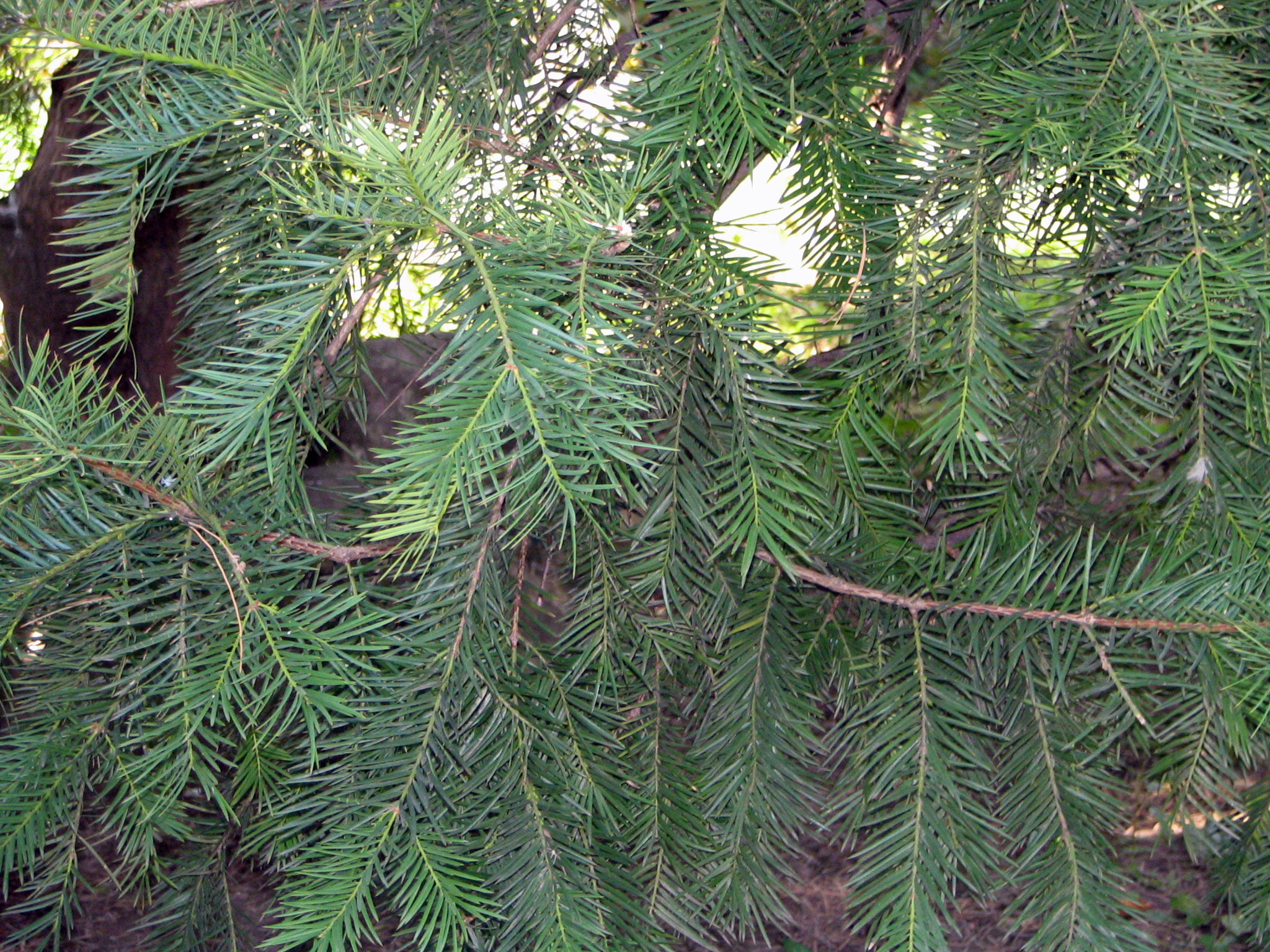
- Torreya nucifera foliage

Conservation status
- Least Concern (IUCN 3.1)

Scientific classification
- Kingdom: Plantae
- Clade: Tracheophytes
- Clade: Gymnosperms
- Division: Pinophyta
- Class: Pinopsida
- Order: Cupressales
- Family: Taxaceae
- Genus: Torreya
- Species: T. nucifera

Binomial name
- Torreya nucifera (L.) Siebold and Zucc.

= Torreya nucifera =

Species of tree native to Japan and to South Korea's Jeju Island

Torreya nucifera is a slow-growing, coniferous tree native to southern Japan and to South Korea's Jeju Island. It is also called kaya (榧) Japanese torreya or Japanese nutmeg-yew.

== Description ==
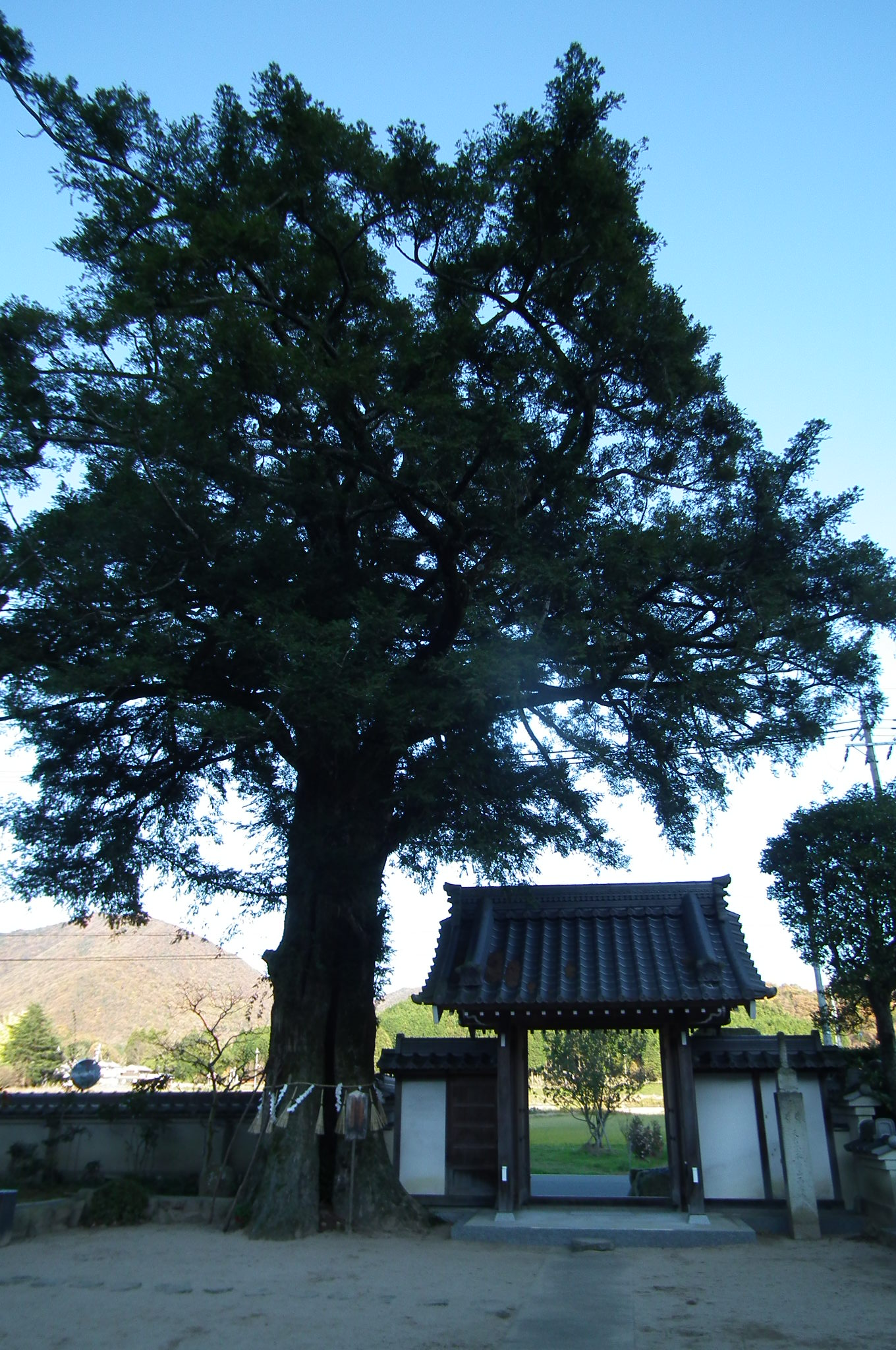
600-year-old Japanese Torreya nucifera (Saiho-ji, Sasayama, Hyogo)

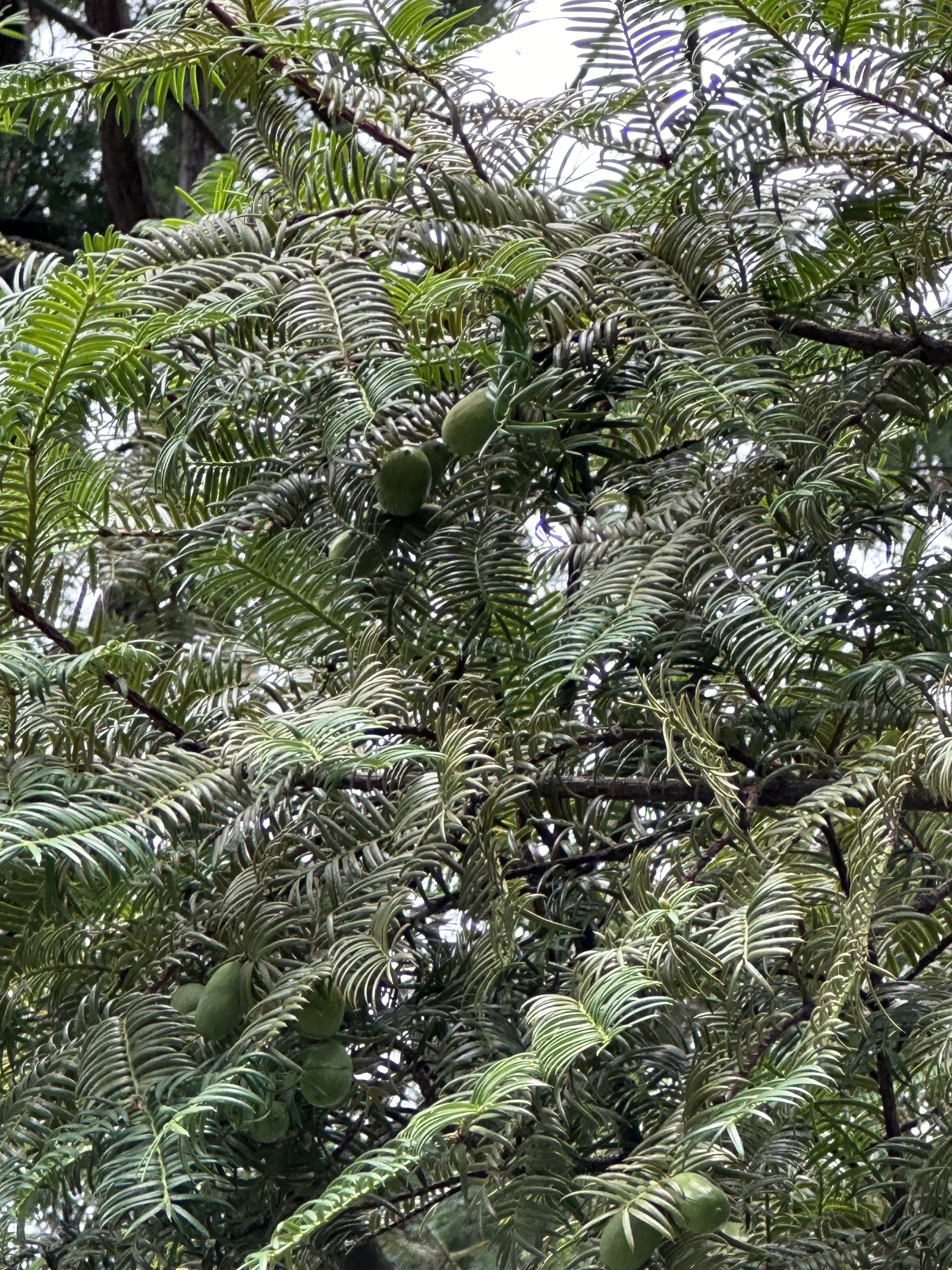
The foliage and fleshy cones of a Torreya nucifera tree in Shiba Park

It grows to 15–25 m (49–82 ft) tall with a trunk up to 1.5 m (4 ft 11 in) diameter. The leaves are evergreen, needle-like, 2–3 cm long and 3 mm broad, with a sharply spined tip and two whitish stomatal bands on the underside; they are spirally arranged, but twisted at the base to lie horizontally either side of the stem. It is subdioecious, with individual trees producing either mostly male or mostly female cones, but usually with at least some cones of the other sex present. The male cones are globular, 5–6 mm diameter, in a double row along the underside of a shoot. The female cones are borne in clusters of three to eight together, maturing in 18–20 months to a single seed surrounded by a fleshy layer, 2 cm long and 1.5 cm broad.

In a botanical survey of Japanese conifers published in 1916 by Ernest Henry Wilson, Wilson described finding kaya in both broad-leafed and coniferous strands "in nearly every wood and forest" from Yakushima to Tokyo. The most populous location he identified was on Mount Takao, southwest of Tokyo, where it grew in abundance on steep slopes made of shale alongside Abies firma.

== Uses ==
Its wood is prized for the construction of Go boards and Shogi boards because of its beautiful yellow-gold color, fine and uniform ring texture, and the sonic quality of the click of a stone on its surface. The tree is protected in Japan because of its scarcity due to past overcutting. Ancient kaya trees have to be harvested to make thick Go boards, which makes them extremely expensive; the finest ones can cost over $20,000. Shin-kaya ("new kaya" in Japanese), imitation kaya, is usually Alaskan, Tibetan or Siberian white spruce, which has become somewhat popular for cheaper equipment due to the scarcity of kaya trees. Go bowls can also be made of kaya, though this is less common.

In Japanese esoteric Buddhism sects such as Shingon, the leaves of the tree as well as the oil extracted have ritual uses. The leaves of the tree represent flowers and the oil from the tree is burnt as a lamp during a long meditation practice known as Morning Star meditation.

The seeds are edible and are eaten roasted as a snack, like that of Torreya grandis, and also pressed for their vegetable oil content.

Other than that, the trees can have cultural and historic significance to people living around them, such as the Japanese Torreya of Samin-ri.

Torreya nucifera extract has been studied for potential medicinal benefits, including treatment of acne and amoebiasis. Some terpenoids and biflavonoids derived from Torreya nucifera have been shown to act as protease inhibitors on SARS-CoV-2.

== Famous trees ==
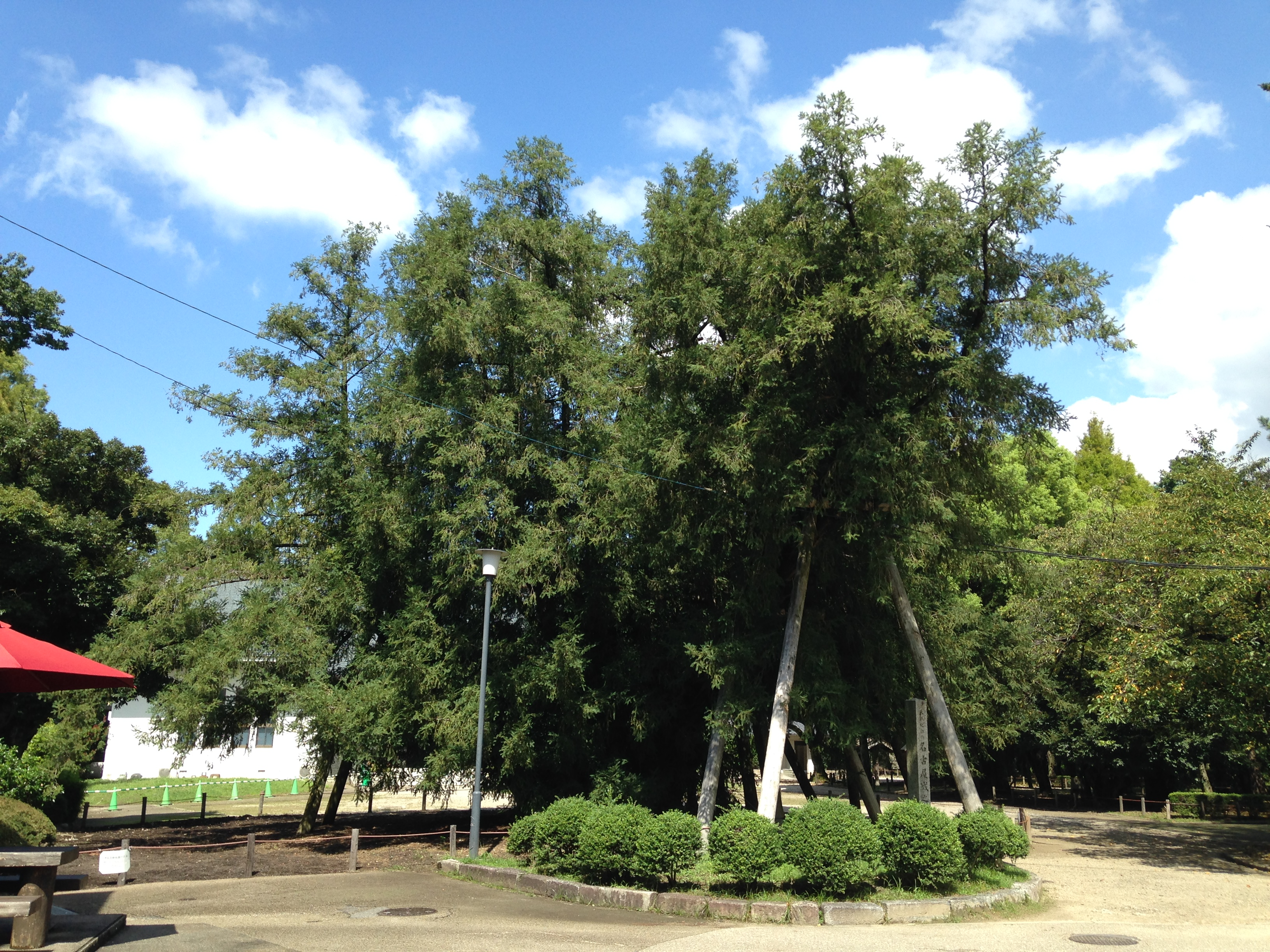
Old kaya tree on the grounds of Nagoya Castle

An old tree is located close to the Nishinomaru-enokida Gate at Nagoya Castle. Its height is 16 m (52 ft) and it is 8 m (26 ft) at the base. Over 600 years old, the tree was already there when the castle was constructed. It is the only government-designated natural monument in Nagoya. Despite suffering damage during the an air raid on Nagoya in 1945, the tree survived and regained its vitality. Tokugawa Yoshinao, the first feudal lord of Owari, and thus the castle, is said to have decorated his dinner tray with torreya nuts from this tree before going into battle in Osaka, and later for New Year's celebrations.
