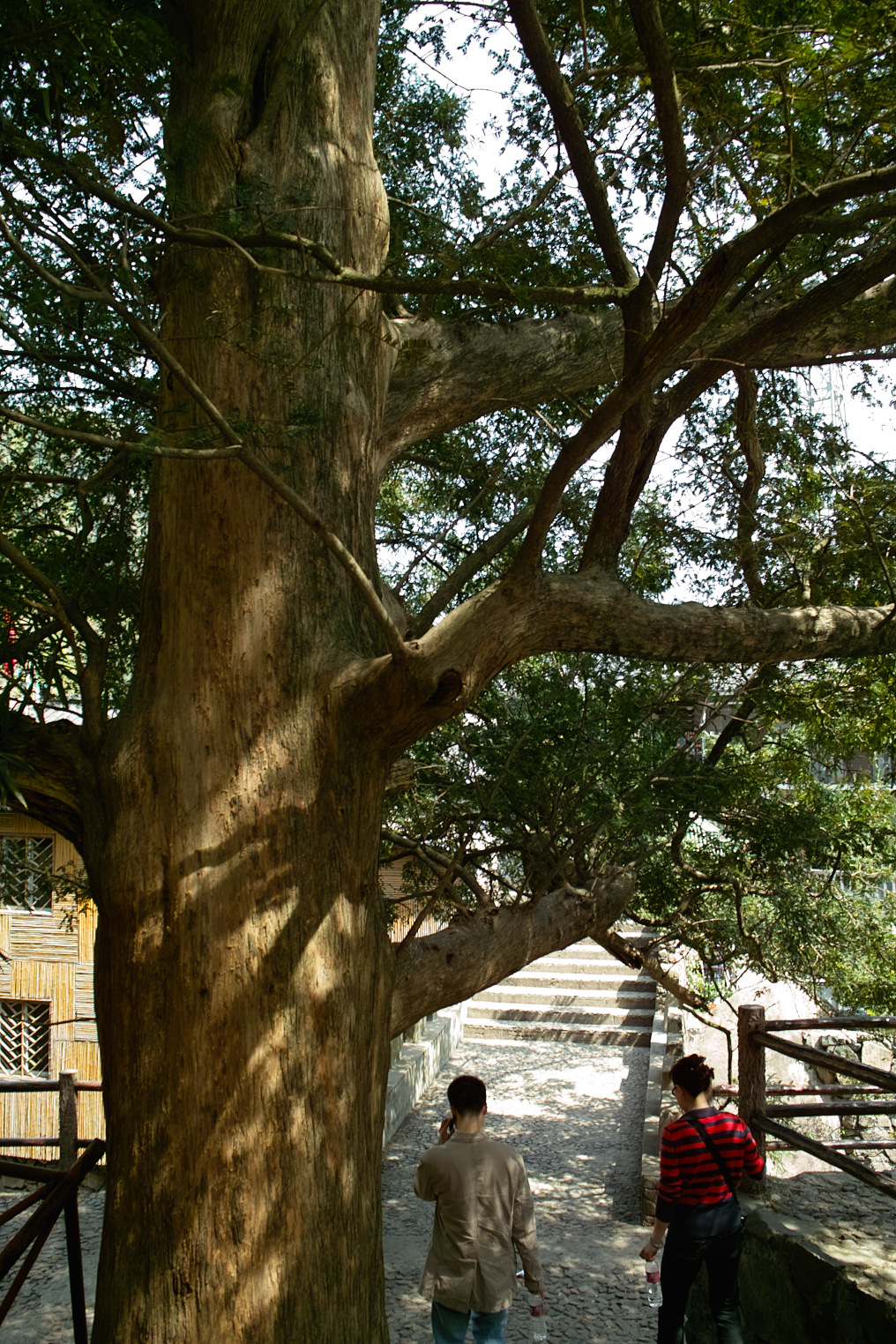

Conservation status
- Least Concern (IUCN 3.1)

Scientific classification
- Kingdom: Plantae
- Clade: Tracheophytes
- Clade: Gymnospermae
- Division: Pinophyta
- Class: Pinopsida
- Order: Cupressales
- Family: Taxaceae
- Genus: Torreya
- Species: T. grandis

Binomial name
- Torreya grandis Fortune ex Lindl.

= Torreya grandis =

Species of conifer

Torreya grandis (Chinese: 香榧; pinyin: xiāngfěi; lit. 'fragrant nutmeg yew') is a species of conifer in either the family Taxaceae, or Cephalotaxaceae. Common names include Chinese Torreya and Chinese nutmeg yew, which refers to its edible seeds that resemble nutmeg and to its yew-like foliage, although it is not related to either nutmeg nor to the true yews belonging to the genus Taxus. Originating in the Jurassic period, about 170 million years ago, it is known as a "living fossil". T. grandis is a large tree that can attain height of 25 metres (82 ft), and possibly as high as 39 metres (128 ft). T. grandis is endemic to eastern and south-eastern China; it is found in the coastal provinces Fujian, Zhejiang, and Jiangsu, as well as in Anhui, Guizhou, Hunan, and Jiangxi inland. Its natural habitat are mountains and open valleys, often by streams, between 200 and 1,400 metres (660 and 4,590 ft) ASL. T. grandis is a precious tree species with multiple values. According to survey data, its economic life is more than a thousand years.

Torreya grandis cv. Merrillii is a cultivar with a history going back to the Tang dynasty. It is believed to originate from the mountains of northeast Zhejiang.

== Uses ==
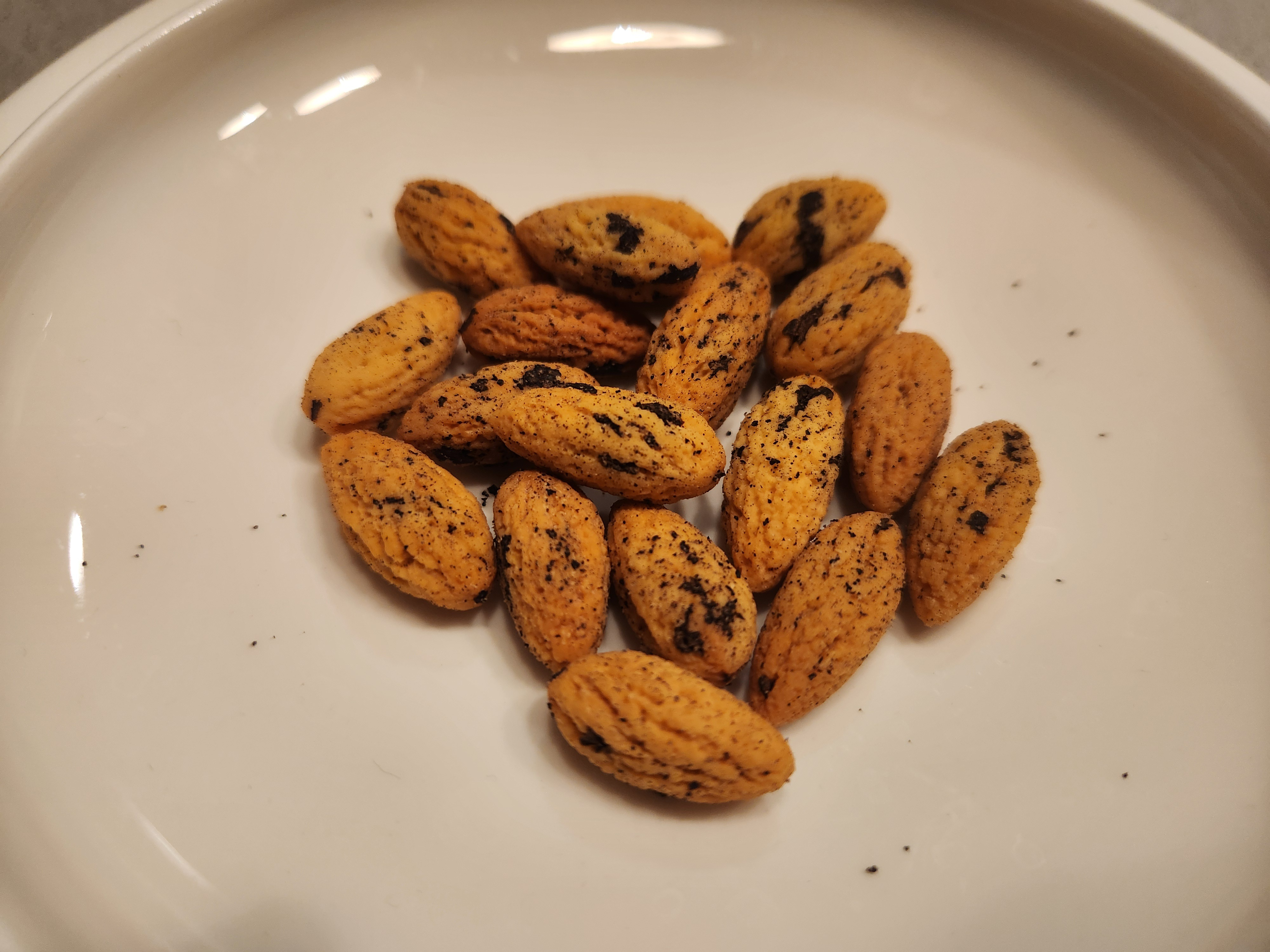
Shelled T. grandis nuts

The nuts are edible or can be pressed for oil, and have high nutritional value. In traditional Chinese medicine, T. grandis has the effects of "eliminating malnutrition" (消除疳積), "moisturizing the lungs and smoothing the intestines" (潤肺滑腸), "resolving phlegm and relieving cough" (化痰止咳), "treating five hemorrhoids and removing three intestinal parasites" (治五痔，去三蟲), "beneficial to muscles and bones" (助筋骨), and so on. According to modern chemical and medical analysis, T. grandis does have a number of benefits and curative effects on the human body; for example, it has an inhibitory effect on lymphoblastic leukemia, and also has the effects of regulating blood lipids, softening cardiovascular and cerebrovascular, and anti-oxidation. In addition, the paclitaxel in leaves, bark, and arils can be used to treat a number of types of cancer.

The linalyl acetate extracted from arils is the raw material for refining essential oil.

The wood is used in construction and high-quality furniture or sculpture, as well as in the production of high-quality go boards.

In Europe and North America, T. grandis is used as an ornamental tree.

== History ==
T. grandis was recorded in the first surviving Chinese dictionary, Erya, as early as the 2nd century BC. In addition to ancient agricultural and Chinese medicine books such as Shennong Ben Cao Jing, Xinxiu bencao or Bencao Gangmu, it is described and cherished in ancient Chinese poetry. In the Song dynasty, processed salt and pepper nutmeg-yew (椒鹽香榧), sugar ball nutmeg-yew (糖球香榧), and nutmeg-yew pastry (香榧酥) were listed as court tributes, and it was also a treasure on the dining table of senior scholar-officials.

T. grandis has been cultivated for more than 1,500 years, but it was only sporadically planted because of the low survival rate, slow growth rate and low fruiting rate. Modern research on T. grandis only began in the 1920s. The industry started in the 1970s. After decades of research by forestry experts, the relevant problems have been gradually solved. T. grandis can be regarded as a new industry in the 21st century. It has changed from a traditional industry to a technological industry, and it is developing vigorously. Among the scholars who devoted themselves to T. grandis, Professor Wu Jiasheng (吴家胜) and Professor Dai Wensheng (戴文圣) were rated as "The most 'beautiful' scientific and technical personnel" (最「美」科技人员) by the CCP Central Publicity Department.

The first European to discover Torreya grandis was Robert Fortune, who was hiking in the mountains of northeast Zhejiang in search of seeds, particularly those of the "golden pine-tree" (Larix kaempferi). Encountering first two young cultivated trees, he was guided to a valley with mature trees and purchased the seeds. The seeds brought to England could be grown successfully there.

== Example of sustainable agriculture heritage in China ==
In 2013 the United Nations granted status as a Globally Important Agricultural Heritage System to the "Kuaijishan Ancient Chinese Torreya Community," which is located in Shaoxing City, Zhejiang Province. The Kuaijishan community entails 59 villages situated within 402 square kilometers. The oldest measured Torreya grandis tree still nurtured by a village is more than 1,400 years old. This ancient heritage project "reflects a highly sustainable mode of human survival through the careful transformation and utilization of natural resources; the harmonious coexistence of humans with nature."
