= Eastern Asiatic region =

Floristic region in East Asia

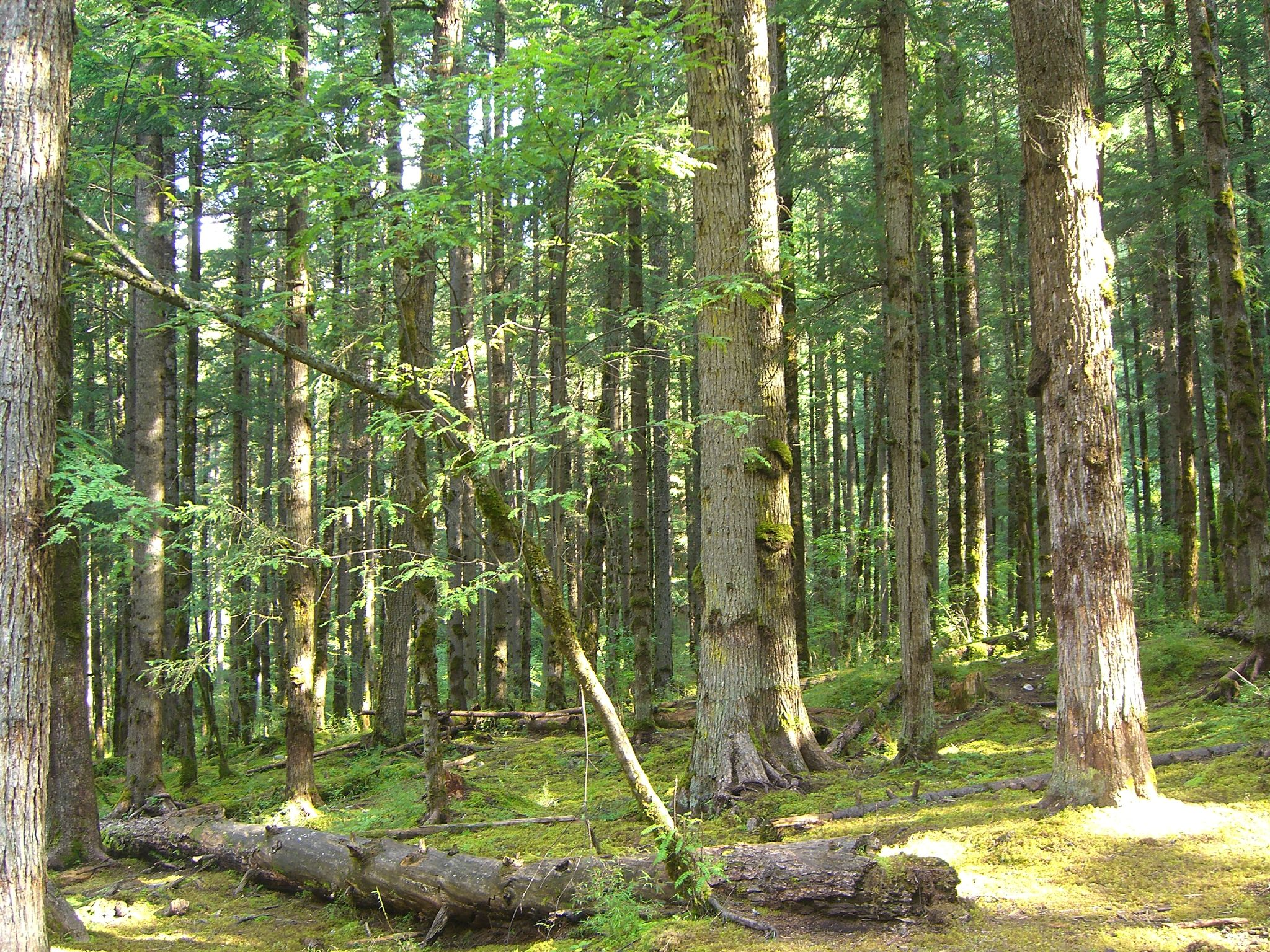
A forest in Sichuan

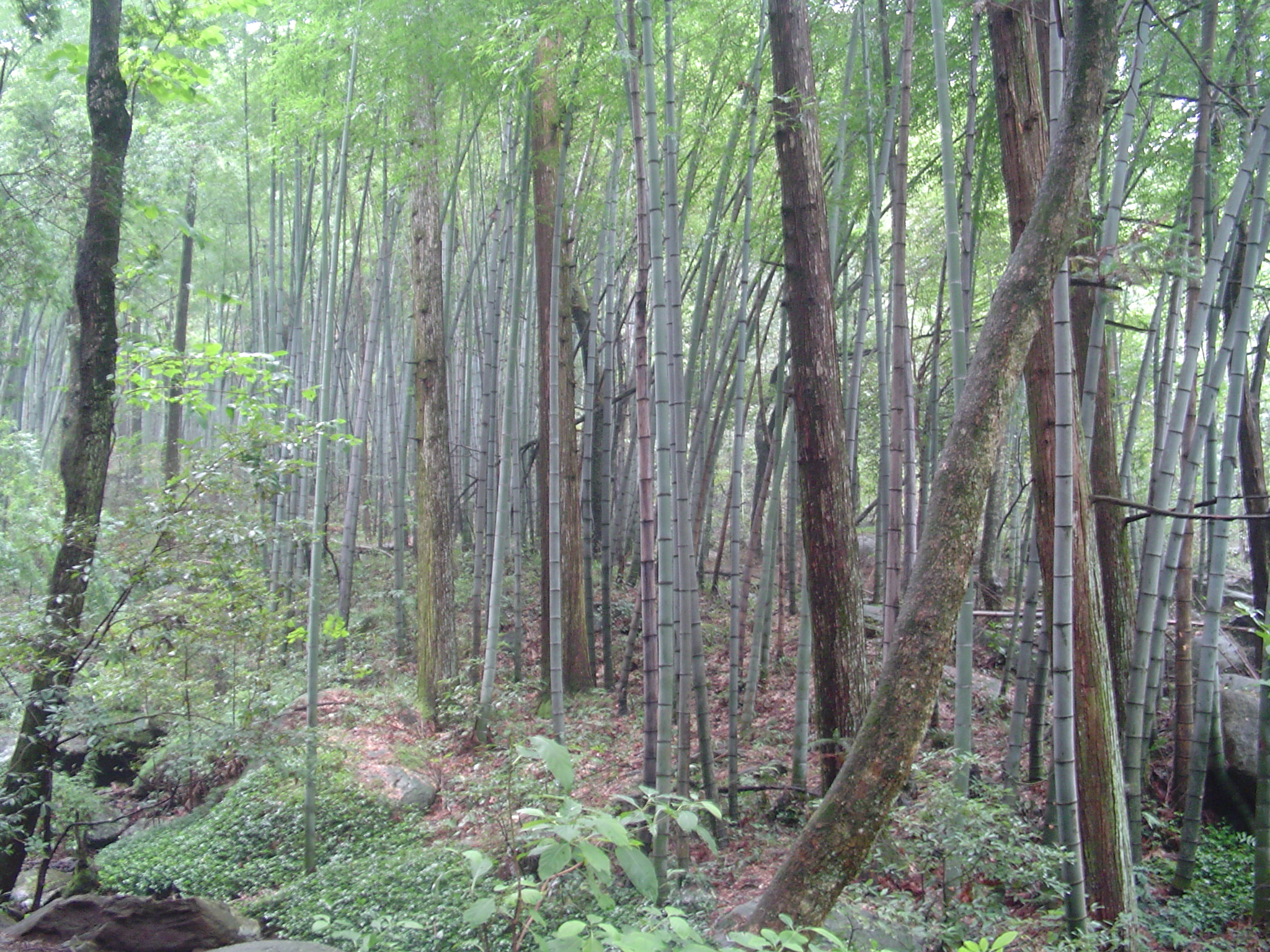
Bamboo forest in Lushan, China

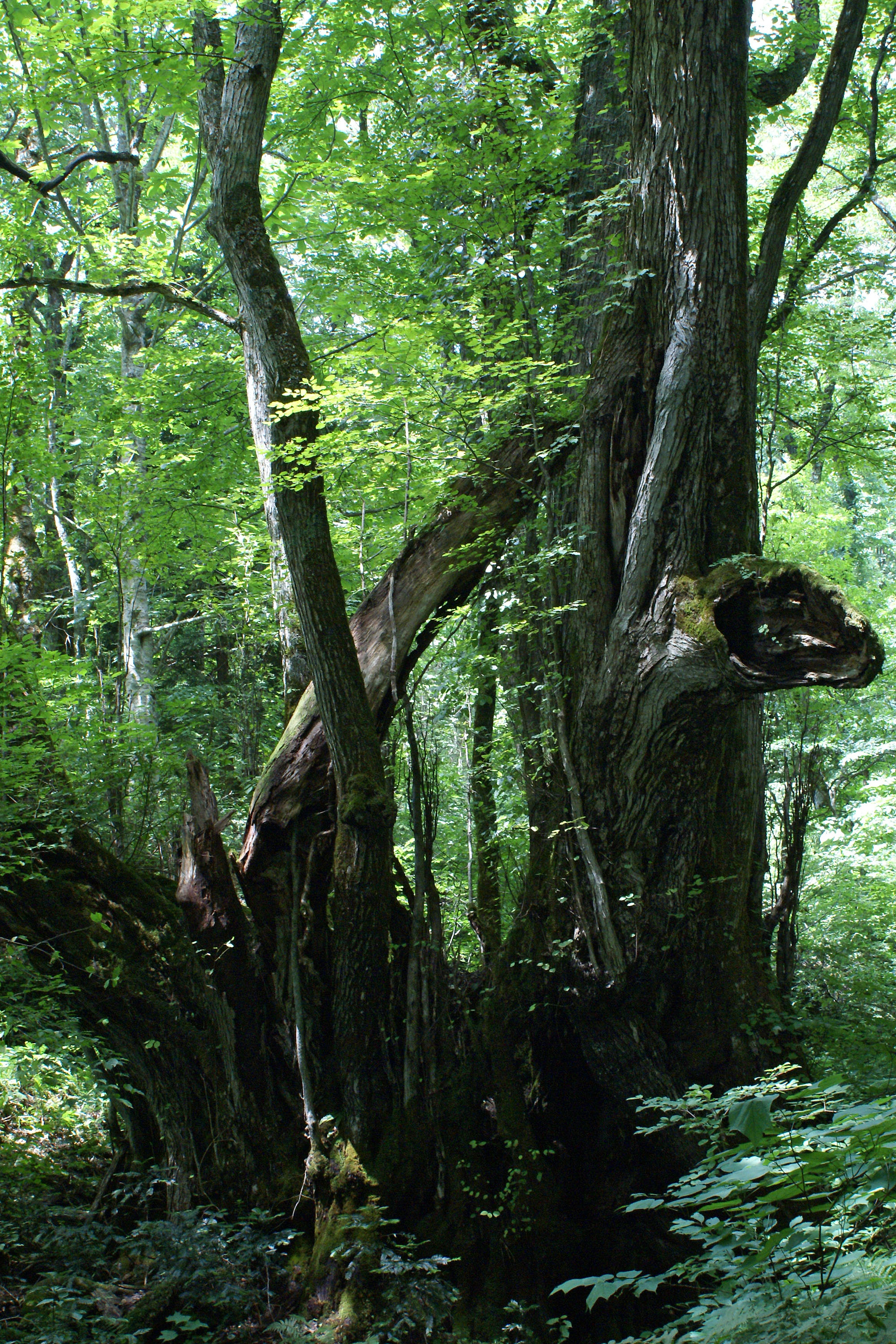
1000-year-old Cercidiphyllum japonicum

The Eastern Asiatic region (also known as Oriasiaticum, Sino-Japanese region, East Asian region, Temperate Eastern region) is the richest floristic region within the Holarctic kingdom and situated in temperate East Asia. It has been recognized as a natural floristic area since 1872 August Grisebach's volume Die Vegetation der Erde and later delineated by such geobotanists as Ludwig Diels, Adolf Engler (as Temperate Eastern region), Ronald Good (as Sino-Japanese region) and Armen Takhtajan.

The Eastern Asiatic region is dominated by very old lineages of gymnosperms and woody plant families and is thought to be the cradle of the Holarctic flora. Moreover, this floristic region was not significantly glaciated in the Pleistocene, and many relict Tertiary genera (such as Metasequoia glyptostroboides, ancestors of which were once common throughout the Northern Hemisphere up to subpolar latitudes) found refuge here.

== Endemic flora ==
The Eastern Asiatic region endemic flora is characterized by:

=== Endemic families ===
- about 30 endemic families, including: Ginkgoaceae, Sciadopityaceae, Trochodendraceae, Tetracentraceae, Cercidiphyllaceae, Circaeasteraceae, Eucommiaceae, Eupteleaceae, Sargentodoxaceae, Nandinaceae, Pteridophyllaceae, Rhoipteleaceae, Stachyuraceae, Sladeniaceae, Dipentodontaceae, Helwingiaceae.

=== Endemic genera ===
- three to six hundred endemic genera, including: Cephalotaxus, Amentotaxus, Pseudotaxus, Keteleeria, Pseudolarix, Cathaya, Metasequoia, Cryptomeria, Microbiota, Akebia, Kingdonia, Megaleranthis, Hylomecon, Eomecon, Маcleaya, Disanthus, Loropetalum, Corylopsis, Fortunearia, Sinowilsonia, Pteroceltis, Idesia, Bolbostemma, Schizopeppon, Clematoclethra, Bryanthus, Schizocodon, Stephanandra, Rhodotypos, Kerria, Chaenomeles, Rhaphiolepis, Prinsepia, Dichotomanthes, Kirengeshoma, Tanakaea, Maakia, Phellodendron, Poncirus, Psilopeganum, Таpiscia, Dipteronia, Fatsia, Tetrapanax, Diplopanax, Evodiopanax, Kalopanax, Hovenia, Dipelta, Kolkwitzia, Oreocharis, Paulownia, Ombrocharis, Paralamium, Perillula, Popoviocodonia, Platycodon, Hanabusaya, Callistephus, Parasenecio, Symphyllocarpus, Metanarthecium, Heloniopsis, Tricyrtis, Cardiocrinum, Hosta, Reineckea, Nomocharis, Milula, Rohdea, Liriope, Aspidistra, Lycoris, Sasa, Phyllostachys, Oreocalamus, Shibataea, Phaenosperma, Chikusichloa, Trachycarpus, and Pinellia.

Approximately eight other families are shared with tropical Southeast Asia (Nageiaceae, Rhodoleiaceae, Daphniphyllaceae, Pentaphyllaceae, Duabangaceae, Mastixiaceae, Pentaphragmataceae, Lowiaceae). As has long been noted, many relict genera occurring in East Asia, such as Liriodendron and Hamamelis, are shared with temperate North America, especially the North American Atlantic Region.

== Adjacent regions ==
The Eastern Asiatic region is bordered by the Circumboreal region of the Holarctic kingdom in the north, the Irano-Turanian region of the same kingdom in the west and Indian, Indochinese and Malesian regions of the Paleotropical kingdom in the south. It comprises the southern part of the Russian Far East, southern part of Sakhalin, Manchuria, Korea, Japan, Taiwan, relatively humid eastern part of the mainland China from Manchuria and the seashore to Eastern Himalaya and Kali Gandaki Valley in Nepal, including Sikkim, northern Burma and northernmost Vietnam (parts of Tonkin).

== Subdivisions ==
According to a version of Takhtajan's classification, the Eastern Asiatic region is further subdivided into 13 provinces; however, the number and delimitation of the southern provinces is disputed and varies even across Takhtajan's work.

- Manchurian province

two endemic genera (Microbiota, Omphalothrix), many endemic species (including Abies holophylla, Picea koraiensis, Ulmus macrocarpa, Crataegus pinnatifida, Vitis amurensis)

- Sakhalin–Hokkaido province

one endemic genus (Miyakea), some endemic species (including Abies sachalinensis, Fragaria yezoensis)

- Japan–Korean province
- Ryukyu province
- Volcanic–Bonin province
- Taiwanese province
- Northern Chinese province
- Central Chinese province
- Southeastern Chinese province
- Sikang–Yuennan province
- Northern Burmese province
- Eastern Himalayan province
- Khasi–Manipur province
