= Anisochaeta =

Anisochaeta is the scientific name of two genera of organisms and may refer to:

- Anisochaeta (annelid), a genus of worms in the family Megascolecidae
- Anisochaeta (plant), a genus of plants in the family Asteraceae
