= Oreocharis =

Oreocharis may refer to:

- Oreocharis (bird), a genus of birds in the family Paramythiidae
- Oreocharis (plant), a genus of plant in the family Gesneriaceae
