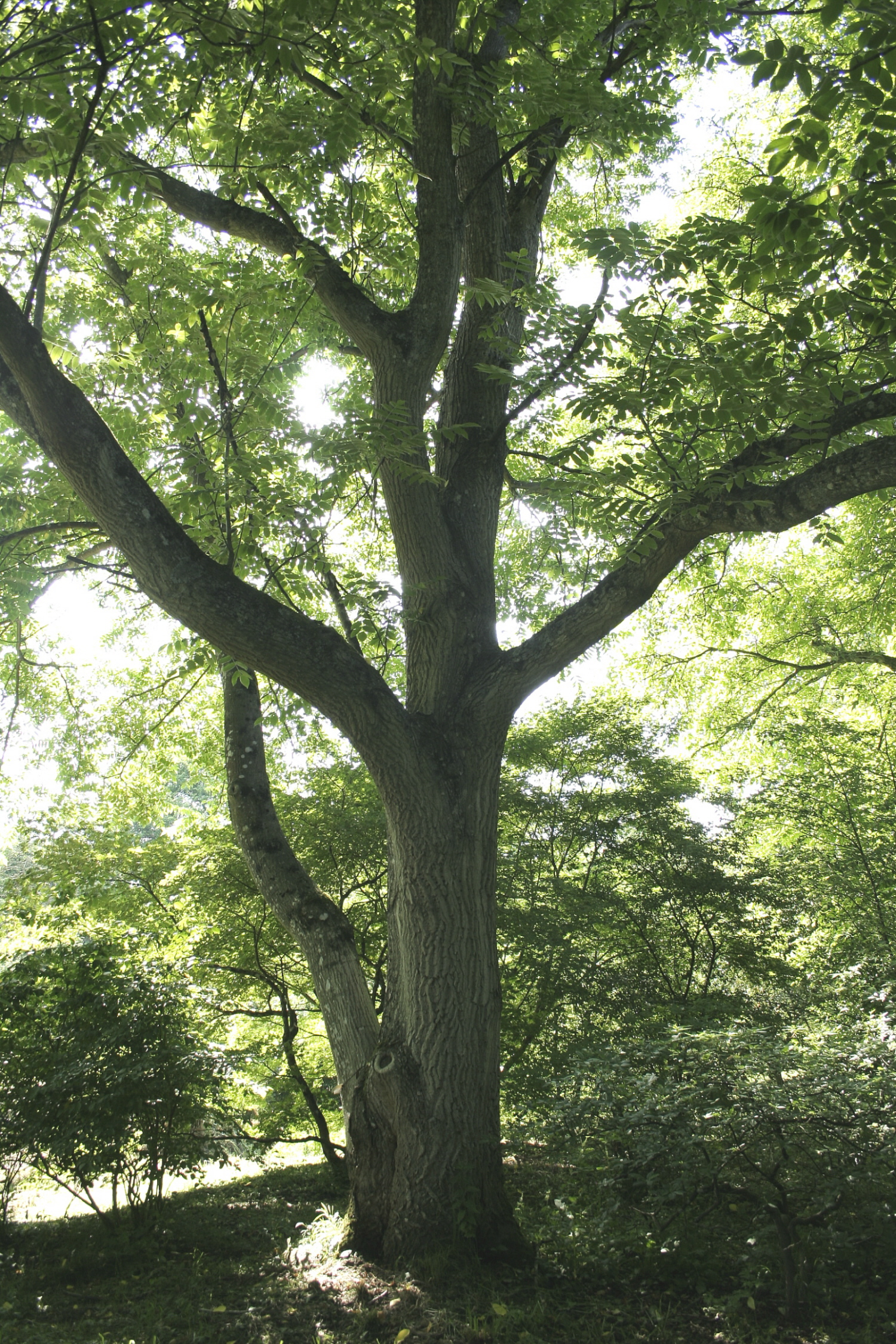
- Tree in Belgium

Scientific classification
- Kingdom: Plantae
- Clade: Tracheophytes
- Clade: Angiosperms
- Clade: Eudicots
- Clade: Rosids
- Order: Fagales
- Family: Juglandaceae
- Genus: Juglans
- Section: Juglans sect. Cardiocaryon
- Species: J. mandshurica

Binomial name
- Juglans mandshurica Maxim.

Synonyms
- Juglans cathayensis

= Juglans mandshurica =

Species of tree

Juglans mandshurica, also known as Manchurian walnut or tigernut, is a species of deciduous tree in the walnut family, Juglandaceae. It is native to East Asia.

== Description ==
The tree grows to about 25 metres (82 ft). The leaves are alternate, 40–90 centimetres (15 1/2–35 1/2 in) long, odd-pinnate, with 7–19 leaflets, 6–17 cm (2 1/2–6 1/2 in) long and 2–7.5 cm (3/4–3 in) broad (margin serrate or serrulate, apex acuminate). The male flowers are in drooping catkins 9–40 cm (3 1/2–15 1/2 in) long, the wind-pollinated female flowers (April–May) are terminal, in spikes of 4 to 10, ripening in August–October into nuts, 3–7.5 by 3–5 cm (1–3 by 1–2 in), with densely glandular pubescent green husk and very thick shell.

The Manchurian walnut contains and exudes much lesser quantities of allelopathic compounds (such as juglone) than other popular Juglans species and usually causes few significant allelopathic effects in cultivation.

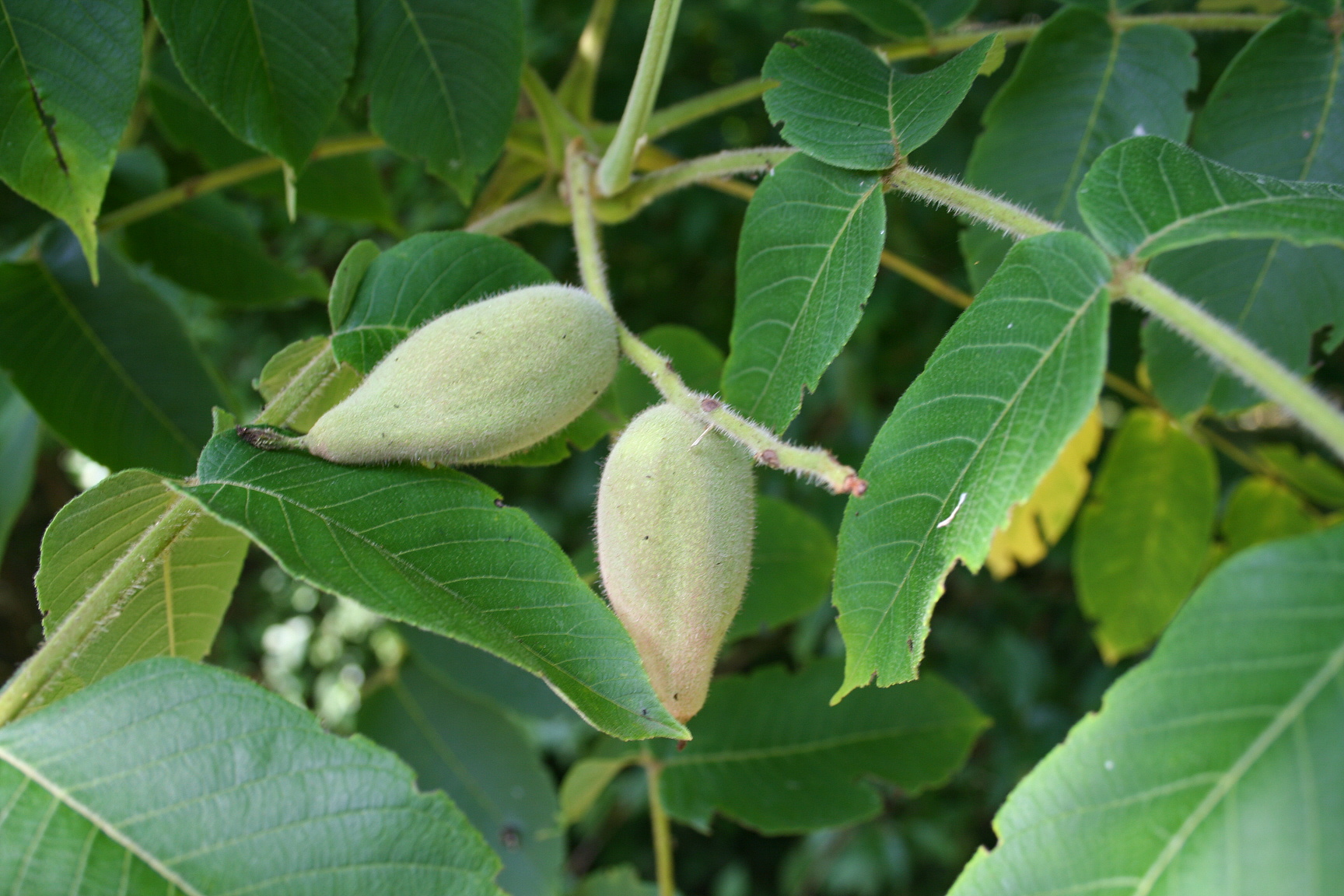
Monkey nuts

== Taxonomy ==
This species was first described by the Russian botanist Carl Johann Maximowicz in 1856.

Juglans cathayensis, characterized by tomentose leaflets, producing more flowers per spike and growing south of the Yellow River, was sometimes recognized as a species separate from J. mandshurica.

The Japanese walnut is listed by some authorities as Juglans mandshurica var. sachalinensis (syn. Juglans ailantifolia).

== Distribution and habitat ==
The species is native to the Eastern Asiatic Region (China, Russian Far East, North Korea and South Korea).

The tree is exceptionally hardy (down to at least −45 °C), has a relatively short vegetation period compared to other walnuts, grows rapidly and is cultivated as an ornamental in colder temperate regions all over the Northern Hemisphere. For example, it has been found to grow satisfactorily in Edmonton, Alberta, Canada.

== Uses ==
The kernels of the nuts are edible, but small and difficult to extract. The timber is in use, but less valuable than that of English walnut or black walnut.
