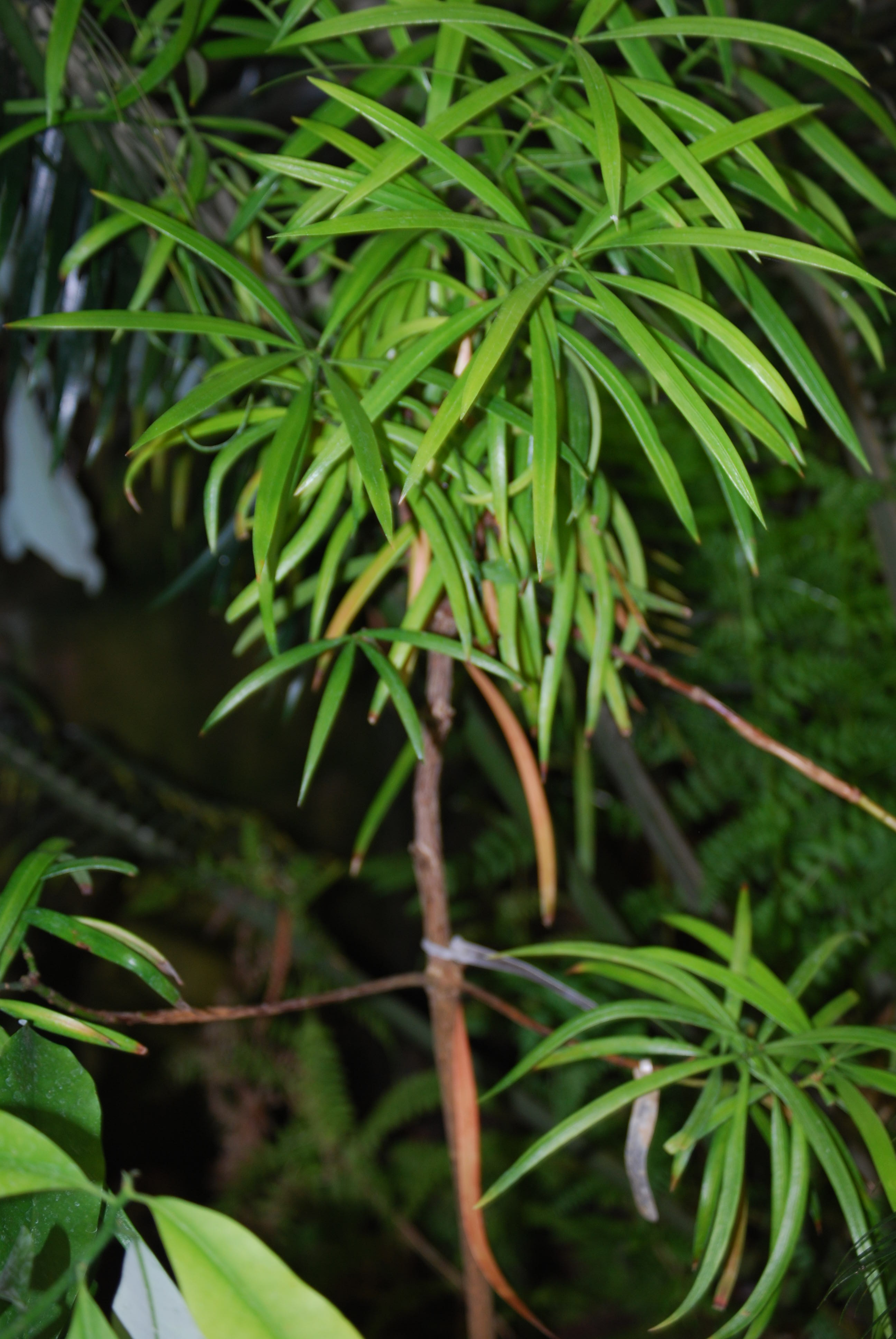

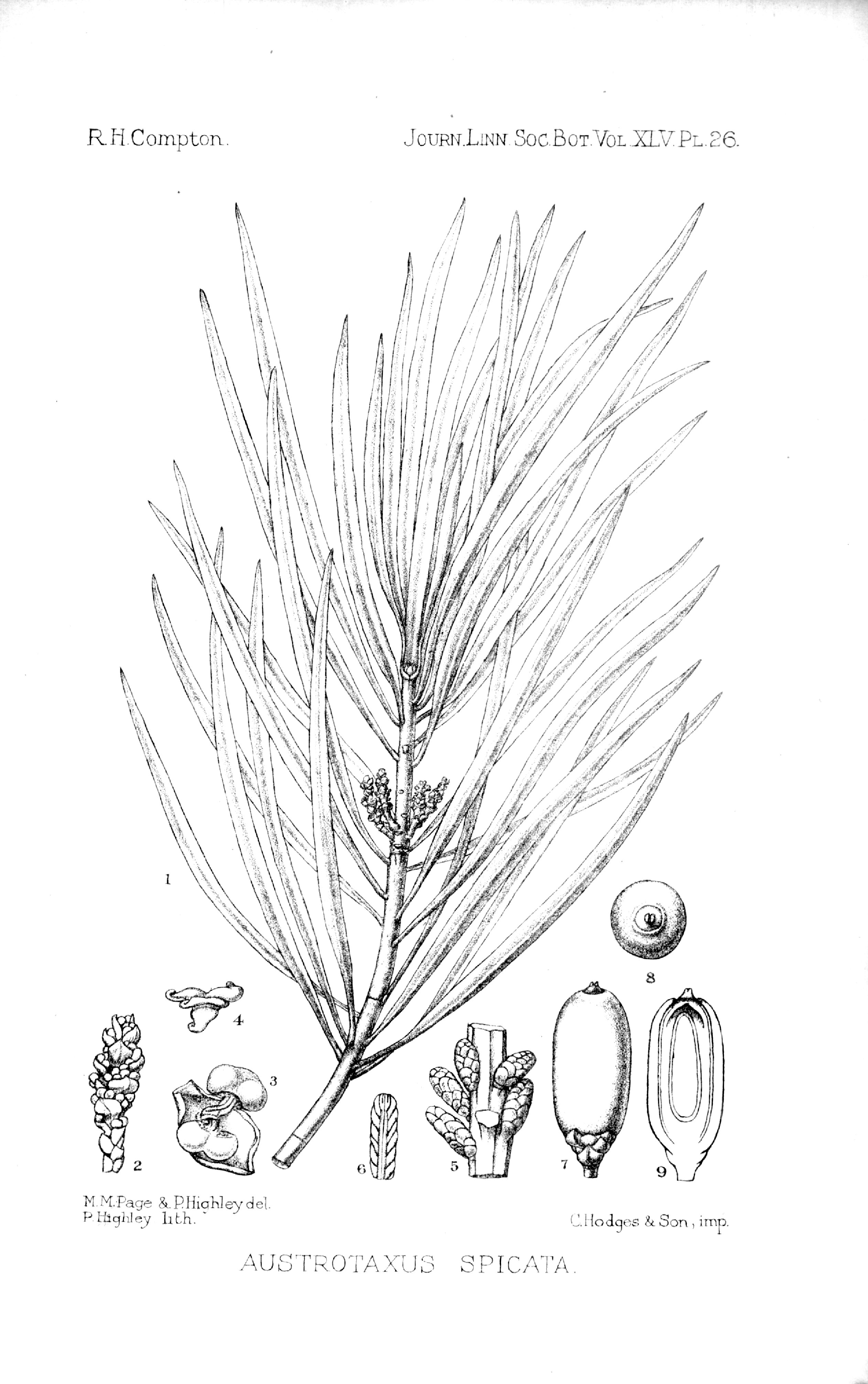
- 1978 engraving of Austrotaxus spicata synomymized Austrotaxus novaezealandae

Conservation status
- Near Threatened (IUCN 3.1)

Scientific classification
- Kingdom: Plantae
- Clade: Tracheophytes
- Clade: Gymnosperms
- Division: Pinophyta
- Class: Pinopsida
- Order: Cupressales
- Family: Taxaceae
- Genus: Austrotaxus; Compton
- Species: A. spicata

Binomial name
- Austrotaxus spicata Compton

= Austrotaxus =

Genus of conifers

Austrotaxus spicata, the New Caledonia yew or southern yew, is a species of conifer in the yew family, Taxaceae, the sole species in the genus Austrotaxus. It is closely related to the other yews in the genera Taxus and Pseudotaxus.

It is endemic to New Caledonia, occurring in the central and northern parts of the island at 300-1,350 m altitude.

It is a dioecious coniferous shrub or small tree, reaching 5–20 m (rarely 25 m) tall with reddish bark. The leaves are lanceolate, flat, 8–12 cm long (up to 17 cm on young plants) and 4 mm broad, dark green above, with two paler green stomatal bands below; they are arranged spirally on the stem.

The seed cones are drupe-like, 20–25 mm long, with a fleshy aril almost completely surrounding the single seed, but with the tip of the seed exposed. The male (pollen) cones are 10–15 mm long, slender.

The markedly longer leaves and large seeds readily distinguish it from the yews in the genus Taxus.

== References and external links ==
- Price, R. A. (2003). Generic and familial relationships of the Taxaceae from rbcL and matK sequence comparisons. Acta Hort. 615: 235-237.
