= Athroisma =

Scientific classification
- Kingdom: Plantae
- Clade: Tracheophytes
- Clade: Angiosperms
- Clade: Eudicots
- Clade: Asterids
- Order: Asterales
- Family: Asteraceae
- Subfamily: Asteroideae
- Tribe: Athroismeae
- Genus: Athroisma; DC. 1833 not Griff. 1854 (Euphorbiaceae)

Genus of flowering plants

Athroisma is a genus of plants in the family Asteraceae first described as a genus in 1833. It is native to East Africa and Madagascar.

Species

- Athroisma boranense Cufod. - Ethiopia
- Athroisma fanshawei Wild - Zambia
- Athroisma gracile (Oliv.) Mattf. - Tanzania, Kenya
- Athroisma hastifolium Mattf. - Tanzania
- Athroisma inevitabile T.Erikss. - Rwanda, Tanzania, Uganda
- Athroisma lobatum (Klatt) Mattf. - Somalia
- Athroisma pinnatifidum T.Erikss. - Madagascar
- Athroisma proteiforme (Humbert) Mattf. - Madagascar
- Athroisma psilocarpum T.Erikss. - Madagascar
- Athroisma pusillum T.Erikss. - Kenya
- Athroisma stuhlmannii (O.Hoffm.) Mattf. - Tanzania

species of homonym genus

William Griffith in 1854 used the same name for a genus of very different plants, thus creating an illegitimate homonym. The World Checklist categorizes his name as a synonym of the genus Trigonostemon in the Euphorbiaceae, but makes no mention of the two species names he coined. The Plant List does list the species as unresolved, i.e. of unknown application. The two species names are

- Athroisma dentatum Griff. - Bay of Bengal
- Athroisma serratum Griff. - Tenasserim region of Myanmar
