= Taxales =

Order of conifers

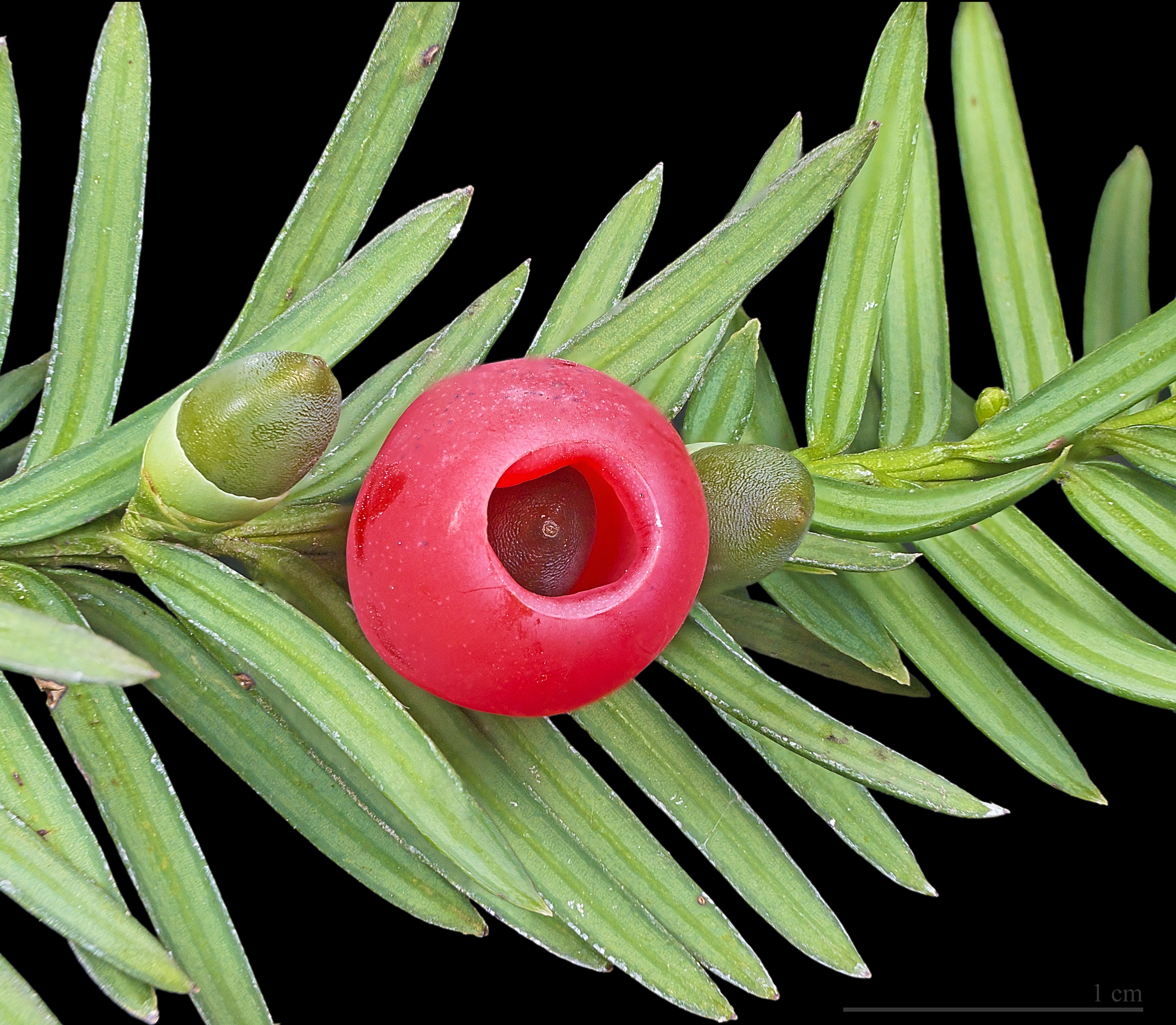
The fleshy aril which surrounds each seed in the yew is a highly modified seed cone scale.

The plant order Taxales was until recently treated as a distinct order in the division Pinophyta, class Pinopsida, and included only those species in the family Taxaceae, known commonly as yews. Under this interpretation, all other conifers were classified separately in the order Pinales. Recent genetic and micromorphological studies, however, have shown the Taxaceae are closely related to the other conifers, particularly so to the family Cephalotaxaceae. The order Taxales is therefore no longer recognised as distinct, and the family Taxaceae is now included in the order Cupressales. See Pinophyta for more details.
