= Blepharispermum hirtum =

Conservation status
- Vulnerable (IUCN 2.3)

Scientific classification
- Kingdom: Plantae
- Clade: Tracheophytes
- Clade: Angiosperms
- Clade: Eudicots
- Clade: Asterids
- Order: Asterales
- Family: Asteraceae
- Genus: Blepharispermum
- Species: B. hirtum

Binomial name
- Blepharispermum hirtum Oliv.

Species of tree

Blepharispermum hirtum is a species of tree in the aster family, Asteraceae. It is native to Oman and Yemen. It grows in escarpment woodland habitat, where it is sometimes a dominant species. In some parts of its range it is vulnerable to overexploitation for its wood.
