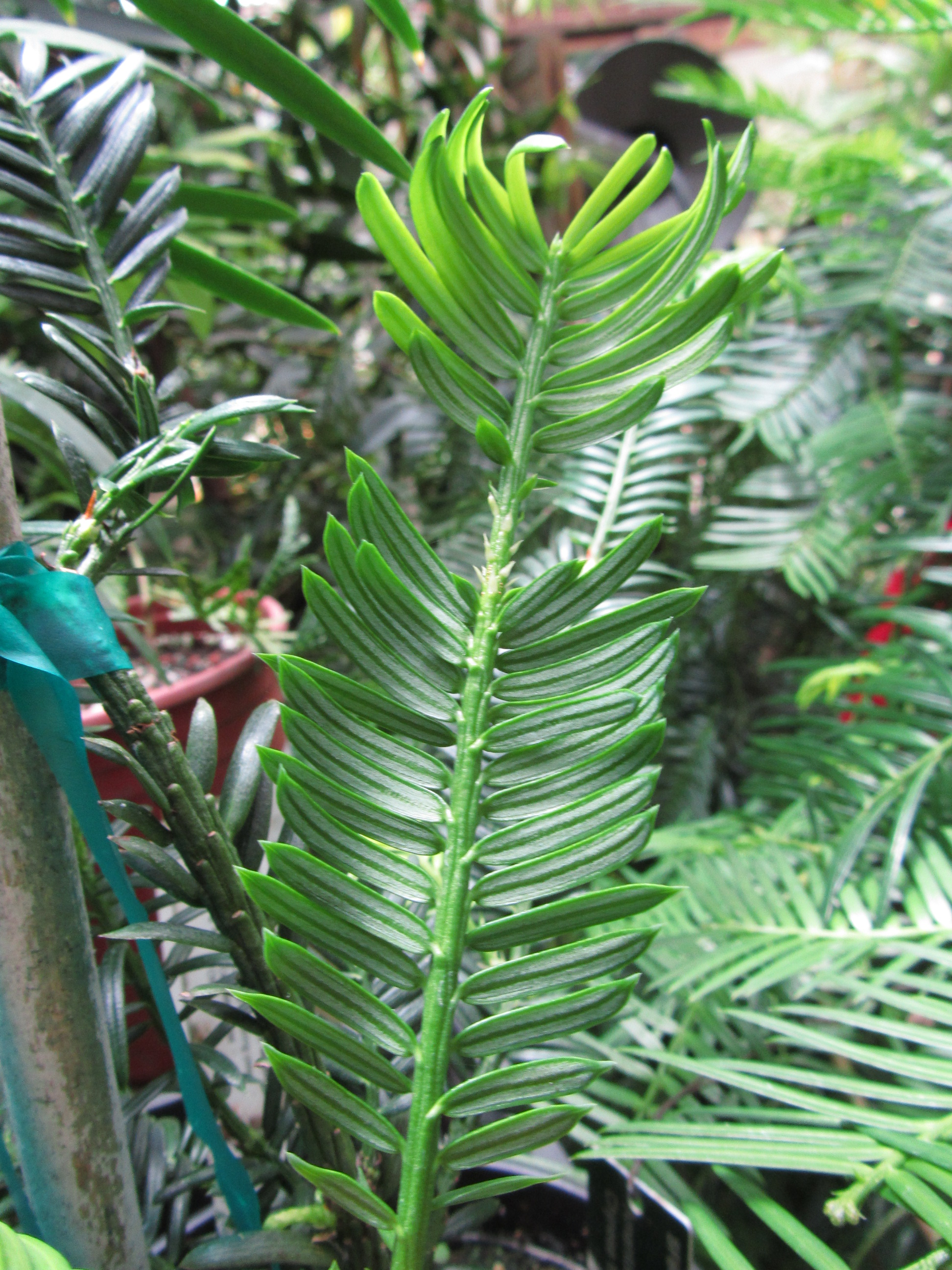

Conservation status
- Near Threatened (IUCN 3.1)

Scientific classification
- Kingdom: Plantae
- Clade: Tracheophytes
- Clade: Gymnosperms
- Division: Pinophyta
- Class: Pinopsida
- Order: Cupressales
- Family: Taxaceae
- Genus: Amentotaxus
- Species: A. argotaenia

Binomial name
- Amentotaxus argotaenia (Hance) Pilg.

= Amentotaxus argotaenia =

Species of plant

Amentotaxus argotaenia, the catkin yew, is a species of conifer in the yew family, Taxaceae. It is a shrub or a small tree up to 7 metres (23 ft) tall.

Amentotaxus argotaenia var. brevifolia has been described from southern Guizhou and listed separately by IUCN. Amentotaxus formosana was previously recognised as a variant of A. argotaenia.

== Distribution ==
In mainland China, the species is found in Fujian, southern Gansu, Guangdong, Guangxi, Guizhou, western Hubei, Hunan, Jiangsu, northwestern Jiangxi, central and southeastern Sichuan, southeastern Tibet and southern Zhejiang. It also occurs in Taiwan. In Hong Kong, it is distributed in Ma On Shan, Tai Mo Shan, Mount Parker, Sunset Peak, Lantau Peak, and Sai Kung Peninsula. In the Shing Mun Arboretum, a living specimen is displayed.

Outside China, it occurs in northern Vietnam.

== Threats ==
The status of the species is not good as the growth rate of the plant is slow and its regeneration is infrequent. Its seeds are poorly dispersed and predated by rats.

The declining of the population is also caused by forest clearing and habitat modification.

The tree's ability to regrow from a stump like other yews gives it an advantage against overcutting, and has likely already prevented its extirpation from Hong Kong; virtually all specimens surveyed showed evidence of having been felled in the past.

== Protection and conservation ==
In Hong Kong, this species is under protection based on Forestry Regulations Cap. 96A. All the localities of the species occurrence are within Country Parks under protection. Tai Mo Shan Montane Scrub Forest in the upper Shing Mun Valley was assigned as a Sites of Special Scientific Interest (SSSI) in 1975 as the forest supports this rare species and other species, Camellia granthamiana, Camellia waldenae, and many species of orchids.

In 2020, 40 saplings raised at the Royal Botanic Garden Edinburgh, Scotland as part of an International Conifer Conservation Programme, were sent to Hong Kong to be planted.

In mainland China, it is recorded in China Plant Red Data Book and Illustrations of rare and endangered plants in Guangdong Province.
