= Artemisiopsis =

Scientific classification
- Kingdom: Plantae
- Clade: Tracheophytes
- Clade: Angiosperms
- Clade: Eudicots
- Clade: Asterids
- Order: Asterales
- Family: Asteraceae
- Subfamily: Asteroideae
- Tribe: Athroismeae
- Genus: Artemisiopsis; S.Moore
- Species: A. villosa

Binomial name
- Artemisiopsis villosa (O.Hoffm.) Schweick.

Synonyms
- Homotypic Synonyms: Amphidoxa villosa O.Hoffm.; Heterotypic Synonyms: Amphidoxa lasiocephala O.Hoffm.; Artemisiopsis linearis S.Moore

Genus of flowering plants

Artemisiopsis is a genus of flowering plants in the daisy family, Asteraceae. It contains only one known species, Artemisiopsis villosa, native to Angola, Botswana, Namibia, the Northern Provinces, Zambia, and Zimbabwe.
