= Amentotaxus assamica =

Conservation status
- Endangered (IUCN 3.1)

Scientific classification
- Kingdom: Plantae
- Clade: Tracheophytes
- Clade: Gymnosperms
- Division: Pinophyta
- Class: Pinopsida
- Order: Cupressales
- Family: Taxaceae
- Genus: Amentotaxus
- Species: A. assamica

Binomial name
- Amentotaxus assamica D.K.Ferguson

Species of conifer

Amentotaxus assamica is a species of conifer in the yew family, Taxaceae. It is found only in India. It is threatened by habitat loss.
