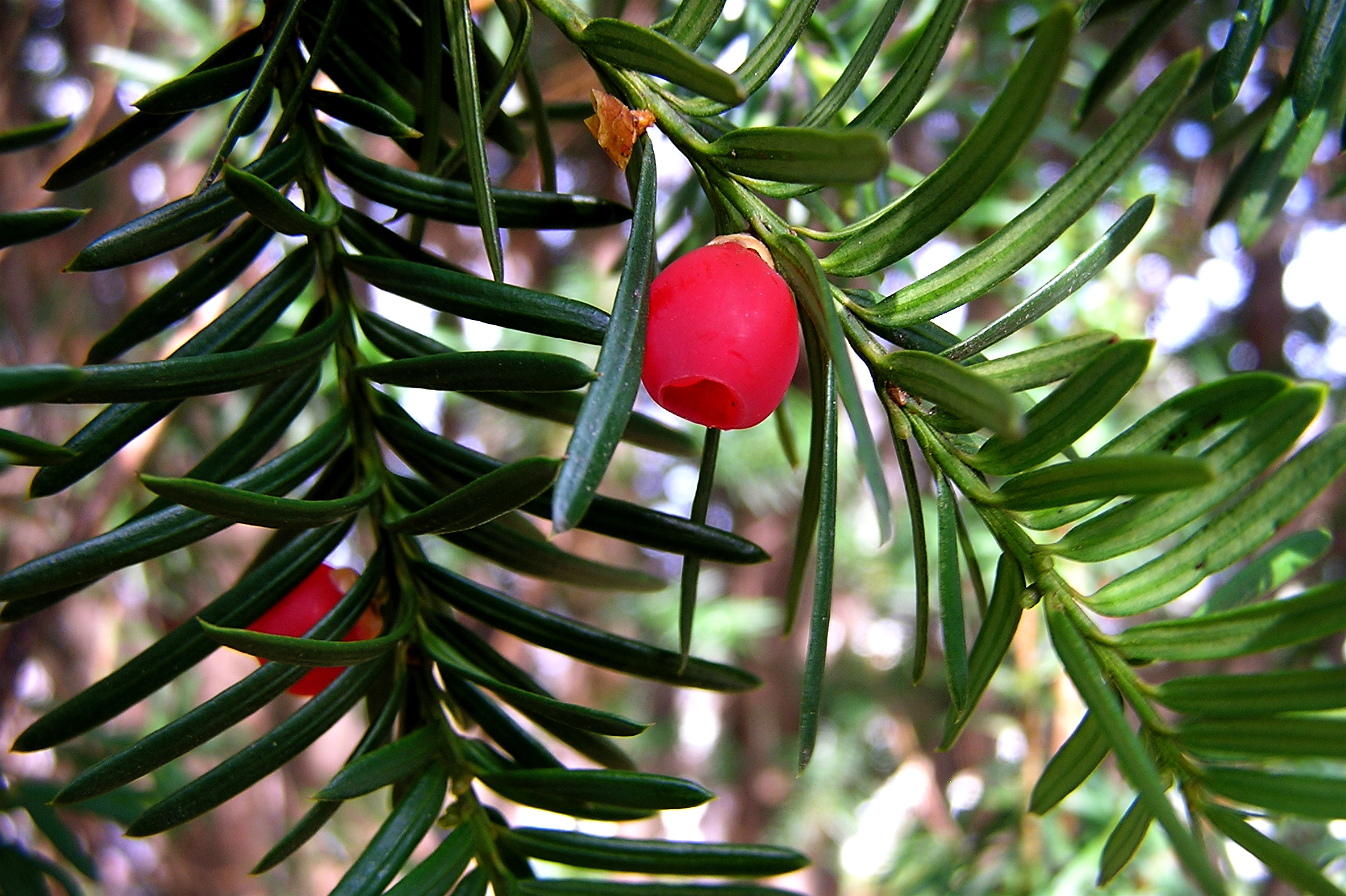
- Foliage and mature arils of a yew plant

Scientific classification
- Kingdom: Plantae
- Clade: Tracheophytes
- Clade: Gymnosperms
- Division: Pinophyta
- Class: Pinopsida
- Order: Cupressales
- Family: Taxaceae; S.F.Gray

Genera
- Amentotaxus; Austrotaxus; Cephalotaxus; †Diploporus; Pseudotaxus; Taxus; Torreya; Taxaceoxylon (fossil wood)

Synonyms
- Austrotaxaceae Neger 1907; Cephalotaxaceae Kudo & Yamamoto 1931

= Taxaceae =

Taxaceae Temporal range: Early Jurassic–Present (possible Late Triassic records)

Yew family of conifers

Taxaceae, the yew family, is a family of coniferous trees and shrubs which includes six extant and two extinct genera, and about 30 species of plants, or in older interpretations three genera and 7 to 12 species.

== Description ==
They are many-branched, small trees and shrubs. The leaves are spirally arranged, often twisted at the base to appear 2-ranked. They are linear to lanceolate, and have pale green or white stomatal bands on the undersides.

The plants are dioecious, or rarely monoecious. The catkin like male cones are 2–5 millimetres (0.079–0.197 in) long, and shed pollen in the early spring. They are sometimes externally only slightly differentiated from the branches. The fertile bracts have 2-8 pollen sacs.

The female 'cones' are highly reduced. Only the upper or uppermost bracts are fertile and bear one or rarely two seeds. They may be found on the ends of branches or on the branches. They may grow singly or in groups or clumps.

As the seed matures, a fleshy aril partly (Amentotaxus, Austrotaxus, Pseudotaxus, Taxus) or fully (Cephalotaxus, Torreya) encloses it. The developmental origin of the aril is unclear, but it may represent a fused pair of swollen leaves. The seeds in some genera are highly poisonous, containing the poisons taxine and taxol, but the mature aril that surrounds them is soft and juicy, often brightly coloured and sweet, but resinous-flavoured in others; it is eaten by birds which then disperse the hard seed undamaged in their droppings. However, if damaged the seeds could release their poisons, which is dangerous for humans.

== Distribution ==
Species are mostly found in the tropics and temperate zones in the northern temperate. There are only a few species in the southern hemisphere.

== Classification ==
Taxaceae is now generally included with all other conifers in the order Pinales, as DNA analysis has shown that the yews are phylogenetically nested in the Pinales, a conclusion supported by micromorphology studies. Formerly they were often treated as distinct from other conifers by placing them in a separate order Taxales. Ernest Henry Wilson referred to Taxaceae as "taxads" in his 1916 book. Taxaceae is thought to be the sister group to Cupressaceae, from which it diverged during the early-mid Triassic. The clade comprising both is sister to Sciadopityaceae, which diverged from them during the early-mid Permian. The oldest confirmed member of Taxaceae is Palaeotaxus rediviva from the earliest Jurassic (Hettangian) of Sweden. Fossils belonging to the living genus Amentotaxus from the Middle Jurassic of China indicate that Taxaceae had already substantially diversified during the Jurassic.

The broadly defined Taxaceae (including Cephalotaxus) comprises six extant genera and about 30 species. There is debate among botanists which family Cephalotaxus belongs to, being recognised by some as the core of its own family, Cephalotaxaceae, and others in the Taxaceae, particularly close to Amentotaxus and Torreya, forming a clade, other studies have found it basal in the family. Phylogenetic evidence strongly supports a very close relationship between Cephalotaxus and other members of Taxaceae, and morphological differences between them are not substantial. Previous recognition of two distinct families, Taxaceae and Cephalotaxaceae (e.g.,), was based on relatively minor morphological details: Taxaceae (excluding Cephalotaxus) has smaller mature seeds growing to 5–8 millimetres (0.20–0.31 in) in 6–8 months, that are not fully enclosed by the aril; in contrast, Cephalotaxus seeds have a longer maturation period (from 18 to 20 months), and larger mature seeds (12–40 millimetres (0.47–1.57 in)) fully enclosed by the aril. However, there are also very clear morphological connections between Cephalotaxus and other members of Taxaceae, and considered in tandem with the phylogenetic evidence, there is no compelling need to recognize Cephalotaxus (or other genera in Taxaceae) as a distinct family.

=== Phylogeny ===
Multiple different phylogenies for the family have been suggested by different studies:

Phylogeny according to Ghimire & Heo, 2013.

- - Austrotaxus
  - - - Pseudotaxus
      - Taxus
    - - Cephalotaxus
      - - Amentotaxus
        - Torreya

Phylogeny according to Byng, 2015.

- - - Cephalotaxus
    - - Amentotaxus
      - Torreya
  - - - Austrotaxus
      - - Pseudotaxus
        - Taxus

Phylogeny according to Leslie et al., 2018.

- - Cephalotaxus
  - - - Amentotaxus
      - Torreya
    - - Austrotaxus
      - - Pseudotaxus
        - Taxus

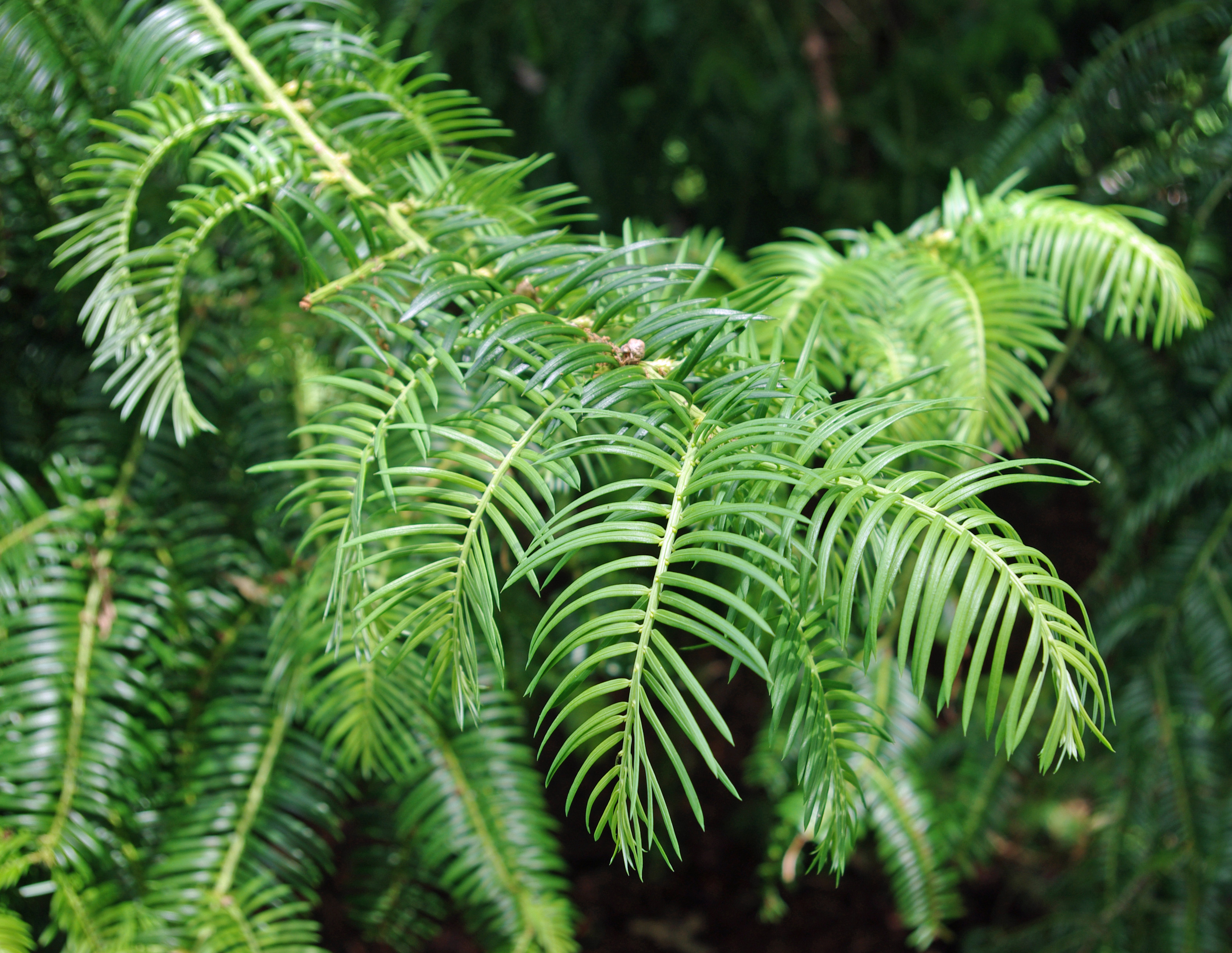
Cephalotaxus harringtonii

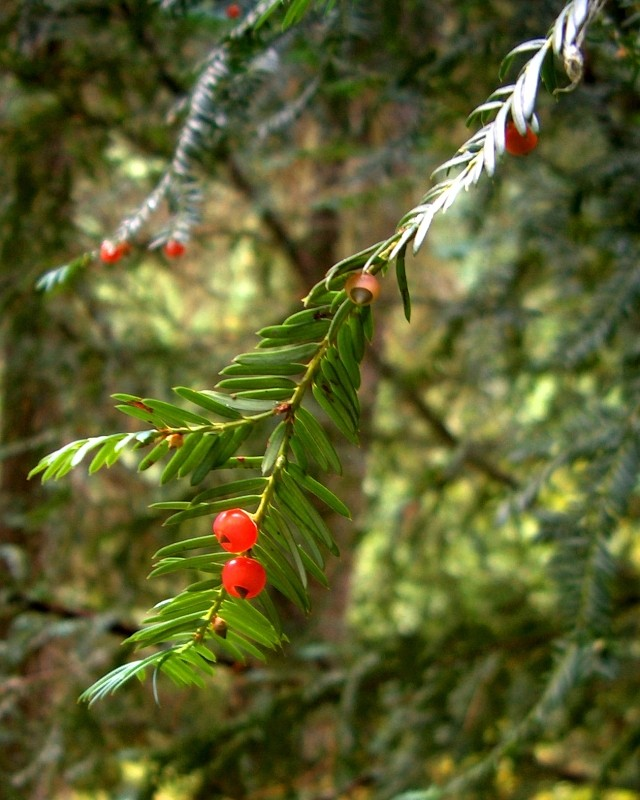
Taxus brevifolia

Amentotaxus Pilg. – Catkin-yews

- Amentotaxus argotaenia - Catkin-yew
- Amentotaxus assamica - Assam catkin-yew
- Amentotaxus formosana - Taiwan catkin-yew
- Amentotaxus hatuyenensis
- Amentotaxus hekouensis
- Amentotaxus poilanei - Poilane's catkin-yew
- Amentotaxus yunnanensis - Yunnan catkin-yew

Austrotaxus Compton – New Caledonia yew

- Austrotaxus spicata - New Caledonia yew or southern yew

Cephalotaxus Siebold & Zucc. ex Endl. – Plum-yews

- Cephalotaxus alpina
- Cephalotaxus fortunei - Chinese plum-yew
- Cephalotaxus griffithii - Griffith's plum-yew
- Cephalotaxus hainanensis - Hainan plum-yew
- Cephalotaxus harringtonii - Korean plum-yew, Japanese plum-yew
- Cephalotaxus mannii - Mann's plum-yew
- Cephalotaxus nana
- Cephalotaxus oliveri - Oliver's plum-yew

Pseudotaxus W.C.Cheng – White-berry yew

- Pseudotaxus chienii - White-berry yew

Taxus L. – Yews

- Taxus baccata European yew
- Taxus brevifolia Pacific yew, western yew
- Taxus calcicola Asian limestone yew
- Taxus canadensis Canada yew
- Taxus chinensis China yew
- Taxus contorta West Himalayan yew
- Taxus cuspidata Japanese yew
- Taxus floridana Florida yew
- Taxus florinii Florin yew
- Taxus globosa Mexican yew
- Taxus mairei Maire yew
- Taxus qinlingensis Qinling yew
- Taxus wallichiana Wallich's yew, East Himalayan yew

Torreya Arn. – Torreyas, nutmeg-yews

- Torreya californica - California torreya
- Torreya dapanshanica
- Torreya fargesii - Farges nutmeg tree
- Torreya grandis - Chinese nutmeg yew
- Torreya jackii - Jack's nutmeg tree, longleaf torreya etc.
- Torreya nucifera - Kaya, Japanese torreya, or Japanese nutmeg-yew
- Torreya taxifolia - Florida torreya
- †Torreya clarnensis

== Extinct genera ==
Several genera have been described from the fossil record and placed within Taxaceae

- †Cephalotaxospermum E.W. Berry, 1910
- †Diploporus Manchester, 1994 Eocene Clarno Formation, Oregon, Late Paleocene, North Dakota
- †Florinia Sveshn., 1967
- †Palaeotaxus Nathorst, 1908
- †Taxaceoxylon Kräusel & Jain, 1964
- †Taxacites Reyre, 1973
- †Taxites A.T. Brongniart, 1828
- †Taxocladus Prynada ex Vassilevsk., 1959
- †Taxoxylon Houlbert, 1910
