= Diploporus =

Diploporus Temporal range: Middle Eocene 45-43mya

Scientific classification
- Kingdom: Plantae
- Clade: Tracheophytes
- Clade: Gymnosperms
- Division: Pinophyta
- Class: Pinopsida
- Order: Cupressales
- Family: Taxaceae
- Genus: †Diploporus; Manchester
- Species: †D. torreyoides

Binomial name
- †Diploporus torreyoides Manchester

Extinct genus of conifers

Diploporus is an extinct genus of conifers in the yew family Taxaceae, containing the single species Diploporus torreyoides known from the middle Eocene of north central Oregon and the Late Paleocene of south central North Dakota. The species was first described from a series of isolated fossil seeds in chert.

== History and classification ==
Diploporus torreyoides has been identified from a single location in the Clarno Formation, the Clarno nut beds, type locality for both the formation and the species. The nut beds are approximately 3 kilometres (1.9 mi) east of the unincorporated community of Clarno, Oregon and currently considered to be middle Eocene in age, based on averaging zircon fission track radiometric dating which yielded an age of 43.6 and 43.7 ± 10 million years ago and argon–argon dating which yielded a 36.38 ± 1.31 to 46.8 ± 3.36 mya date. The average of the dates resulted in an age range of 45 to 43 mya. The beds are composed of silica and calcium carbonate cemented tuffaceous sandstones, siltstones, and conglomerates which preserve either a lake delta environment, or alternatively periodic floods and volcanic mudflows preserved with hot spring activity. An unidentified species of Diploporus has been reported from the Sentinel Butte Formation near the town of Almont, North Dakota and the Beicegal Creek, North Dakota. The age of the formation is based on the recovery of late Tiffanian mammals in the upper section of the formation along with the floral and palynological assemblages of the formation.

The species was described from a group of seventy five type specimens, the holotype specimen UF8542, which is currently preserved in the paleobotanical collections of the University of Florida and a large series of paratypes, totaling seventy-four specimens. The paratypes are in the collections of the National Museum of Natural History, the University of Florida, and the Oregon Museum of Science and Industry. The fossils were part of approximately 20,000 specimens collected from 1942 to 1989 by Thomas Bones, A. W. Hancock, R. A. Scott, Steven R. Manchester, and a number of high school students.

The Diploporus specimens were studied by paleobotanist Steven R. Manchester of the University of Florida. He published his 1994 type description for Diploporus torreyoides in the journal Palaeontographica Americana In his type description Manchester noted the generic name is derived from the Greek words Diplo meaning "twofold" and poros meaning "passage" in reference to the paired vascular scars. The specific epithet torreyoides, reflects the similarities between Diploporus and the living genus Torreya.

== Description ==
The seeds of Diploporus are subovoid and bilaterally symmetrical with a slightly pointed tip and round base. The seeds have an overall length raging between 6.7–8.0 millimetres (0.26–0.31 in) and a width between 5.4–8.0 centimetres (2.1–3.1 in). There is a sharp crest along the upper third of the seed that is formed by the dorsal and ventral faces. As with other Taxacaeae genera Diploporus has a pair of vascular scars on sides, located at the widest point. The seeds are identified from Taxus and Torreya species by several features of the exterior morphology. The overall shape of the base is not as pointed as that of Torreya but not as truncate as the base of Taxus and in size, Diploporus seeds are larger than Taxus seeds, but smaller than Torreya.
