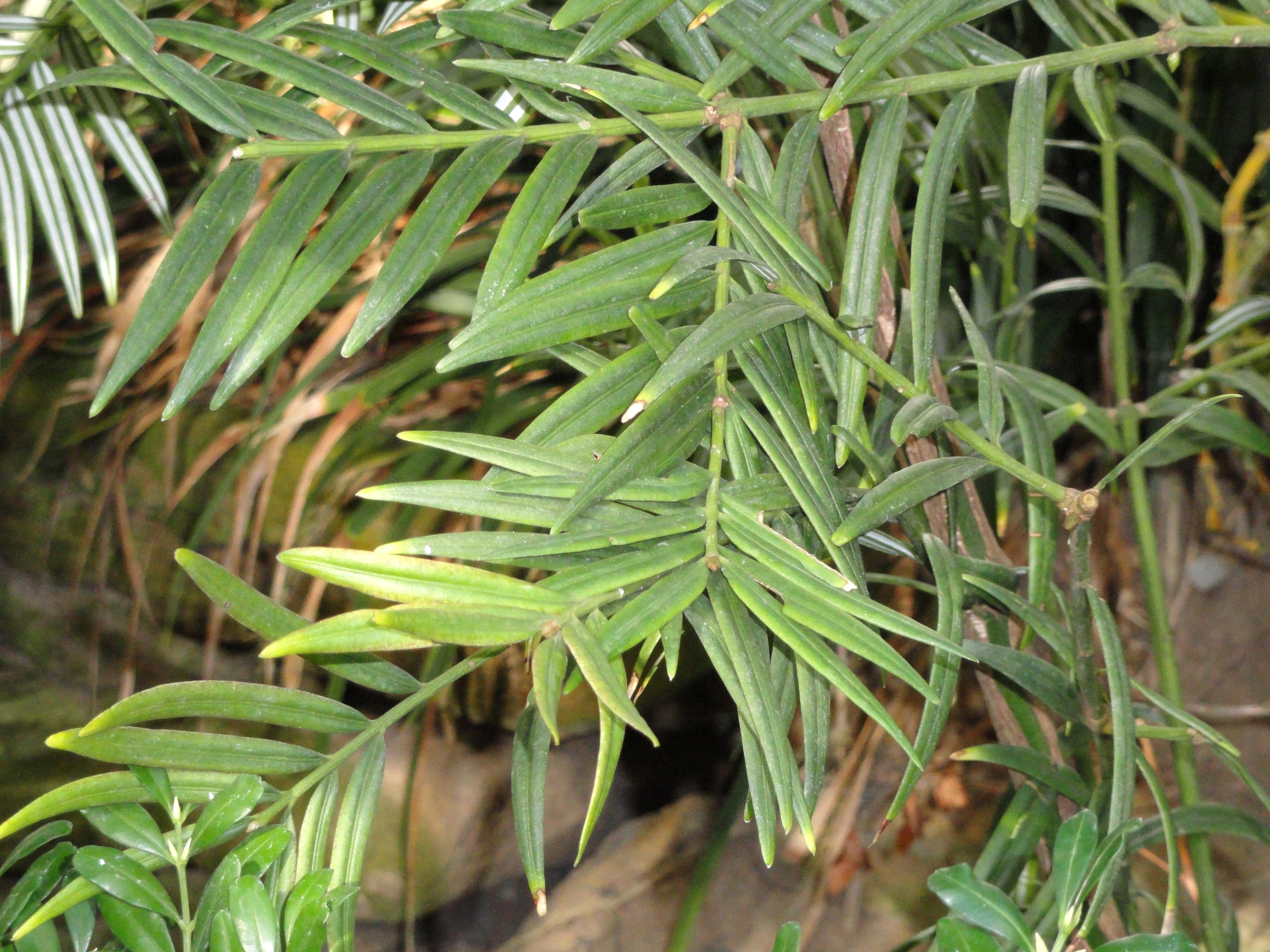

Conservation status
- Vulnerable (IUCN 3.1)

Scientific classification
- Kingdom: Plantae
- Clade: Tracheophytes
- Clade: Gymnosperms
- Division: Pinophyta
- Class: Pinopsida
- Order: Cupressales
- Family: Taxaceae
- Genus: Amentotaxus
- Species: A. yunnanensis

Binomial name
- Amentotaxus yunnanensis H.L.Li

Synonyms
- Amentotaxus argotaenia var. yunnanensis (H.L.Li) Keng f.

= Amentotaxus yunnanensis =

Species of conifer

Amentotaxus yunnanensis, the Yunnan catkin yew, is a species of conifer in the yew family, Taxaceae. It is native to Laos, Vietnam, and Guizhou and Yunnan in China.

It is a medium-sized tree to 15 m (49 ft) tall. Remaining populations are small and threatened by logging.
