= Leucoblepharis =

Scientific classification
- Kingdom: Plantae
- Clade: Tracheophytes
- Clade: Angiosperms
- Clade: Eudicots
- Clade: Asterids
- Order: Asterales
- Family: Asteraceae
- Subfamily: Asteroideae
- Tribe: Athroismeae
- Subtribe: Athroisminae
- Genus: Leucoblepharis; Arn.
- Species: L. subsessilis

Binomial name
- Leucoblepharis subsessilis (DC.) Arn.

Synonyms
- Blepharispermum subsessile DC. (1834)

Genus of flowering plants

Leucoblepharis is a genus of flowering plants in the family Asteraceae. It includes a single species, Leucoblepharis subsessilis, which is endemic to India.
