= Torreya clarnensis =

Torreya clarnensis Temporal range: Middle Eocene 45-43mya

Scientific classification
- Kingdom: Plantae
- Clade: Tracheophytes
- Clade: Gymnospermae
- Division: Pinophyta
- Class: Pinopsida
- Order: Cupressales
- Family: Taxaceae
- Genus: Torreya
- Species: †T. clarnensis

Binomial name
- †Torreya clarnensis Manchester

Extinct species of conifer

Torreya clarnensis is an extinct species of conifer in the yew family Taxaceae solely known from the middle Eocene sediments exposed in north central Oregon. The species was first described from a series of isolated fossil seeds in chert.

== History and classification ==
Torreya clarnensis has been identified from a single location in the Clarno Formation, the Clarno nut beds, type locality for both the formation and the species. The nut beds are approximately 3 kilometres (1.9 mi) east of the unincorporated community of Clarno, Oregon and currently considered to be middle Eocene in age, based on averaging zircon fission track radiometric dating which yielded an age of 43.6 and 43.7 ± 10 million years ago and Argon–argon dating radiometric dating which yielded a 36.38 ± 1.31 to 46.8 ± 3.36 mya date. The average of the dates resulted in an age range of 45 to 43 mya. The beds are composed of silica and calcium carbonate cemented tuffaceous sandstones, siltstones, and conglomerates which preserve either a lake delta environment, or alternatively periodic floods and volcanic mudflows preserved with hot spring activity.

The species was described from a series of type specimens, the holotype specimen UF6510, which is currently preserved in the paleobotanical collections of the University of Florida and two paratype specimens, both of which are part of the National Museum of Natural History collections in Washington, D.C. The fossils were part of approximately 20,000 specimens collected from 1942 to 1989 by Thomas Bones, A. W. Hancock, R. A. Scott, Steven R. Manchester, and a number of high school students.

The Torreya clarnensis specimens were studied by paleobotanist Steven R. Manchester of the University of Florida. He published his 1994 type description for T. masonii in the Journal Palaeontographica Americana. The specific epithet clarnensis was chosen in recognition of the type locality, the Clarno Formation.

== Description ==
The seeds of Torreya clarnensis are fusiform and bilaterally symmetrical with a pointed tip and base. The seeds have an overall length raging between 19.5–20.8 millimetres (0.77–0.82 in) and a width between 10.7–11.3 centimetres (4.2–4.4 in). The seeds are identified as from a Torreya species by several features of the exterior morphology. The overall cross section shape is obovate, with an acutely rounded base where an aril would have attached, a keeled apex, and a pair of vascular scars near the tip. The seeds have a pair of vascular pores positioned on the upper and lower surfaces approximately one third of the way below the apex. The apical area of the seed is defined by a keel created by the edges of the upper and lower faces.
