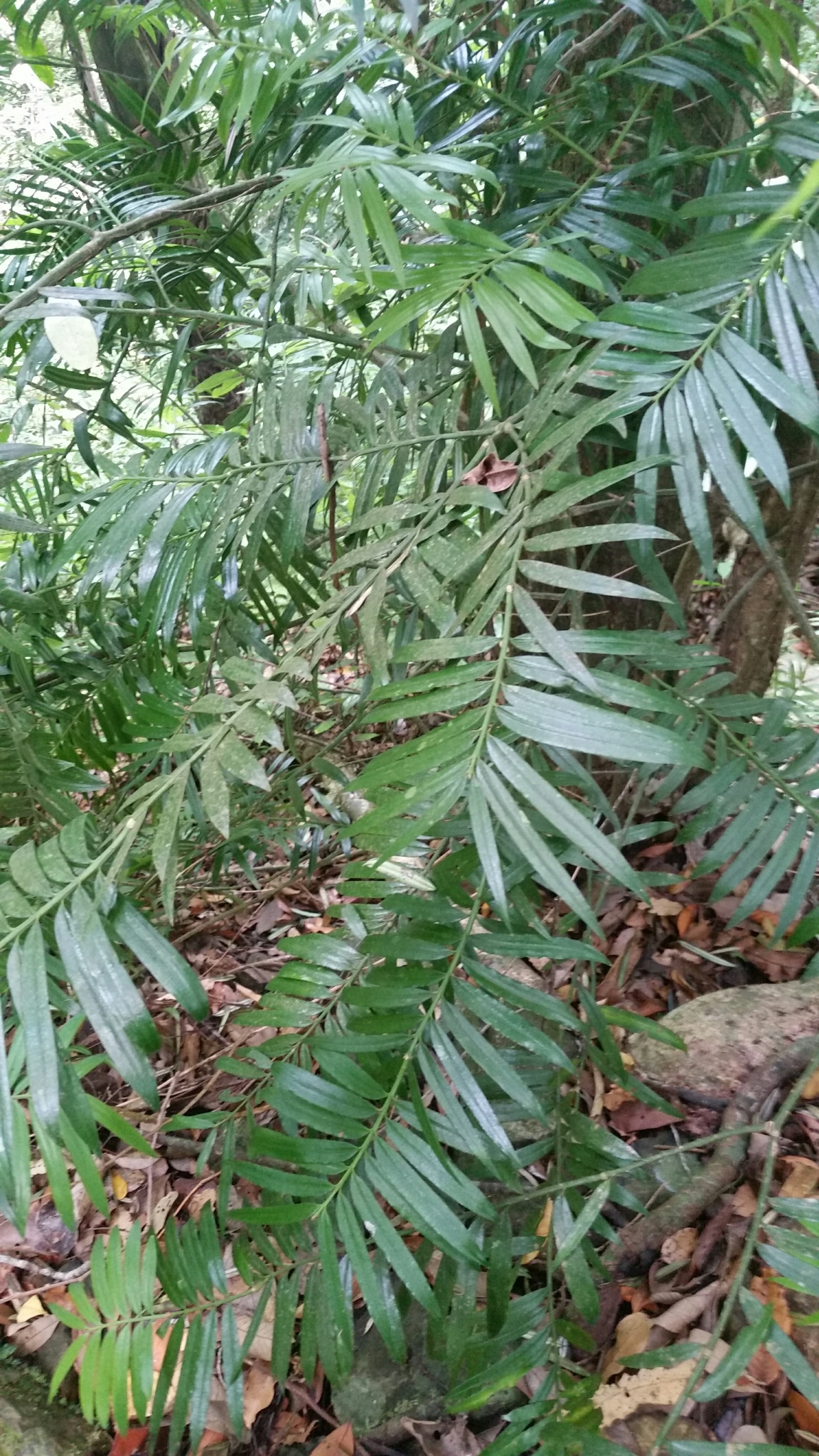

Conservation status
- Vulnerable (IUCN 3.1)

Scientific classification
- Kingdom: Plantae
- Clade: Tracheophytes
- Clade: Gymnospermae
- Division: Pinophyta
- Class: Pinopsida
- Order: Cupressales
- Family: Taxaceae
- Genus: Amentotaxus
- Species: A. poilanei

Binomial name
- Amentotaxus poilanei De Ferré & Rouane D.K.Ferguson

= Amentotaxus poilanei =

Species of conifer

Amentotaxus poilanei is a species of conifer in the yew family, Taxaceae. It is endemic to Vietnam. Its common name is Poilane's catkin yew.
