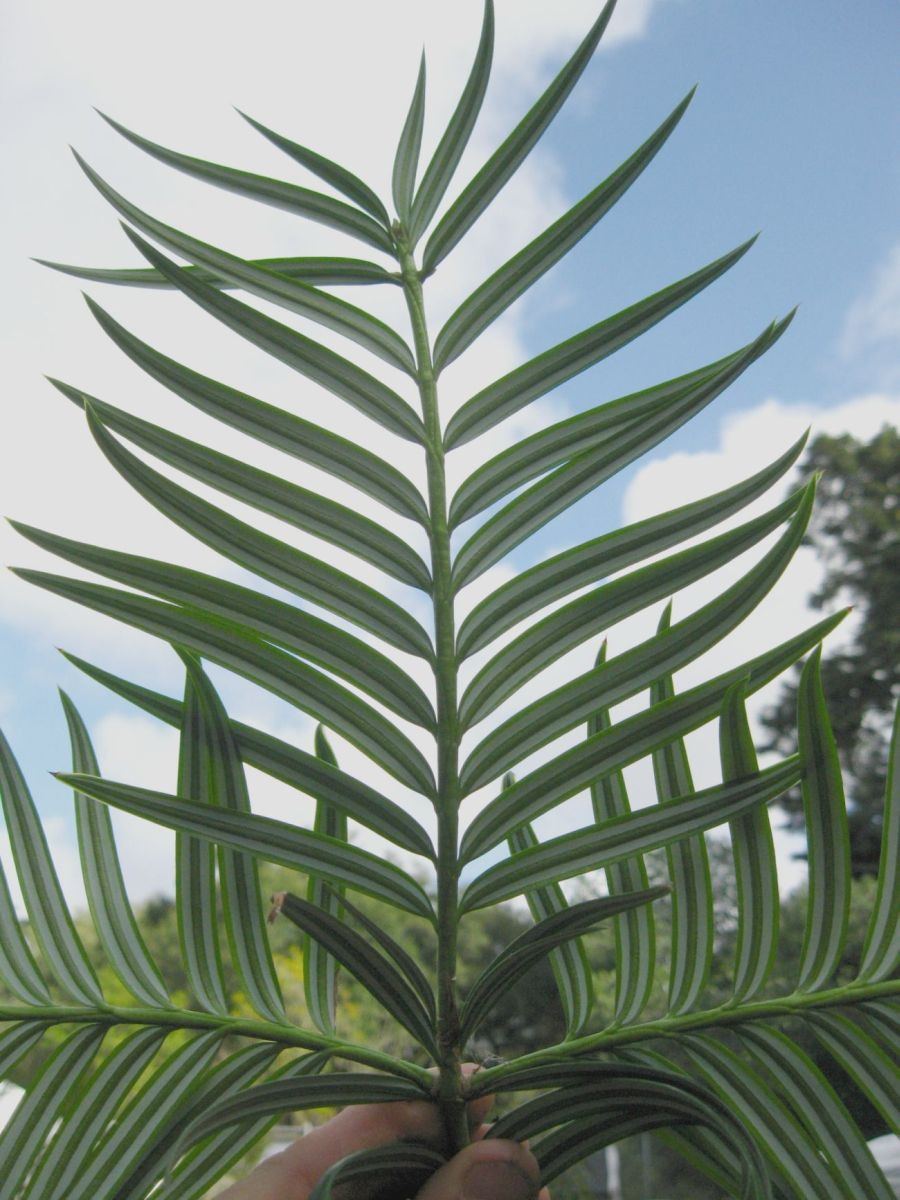
- Amentotaxus formosana underside of foliage showing stomata, Strybing Arboretum, San Francisco

Conservation status
- Endangered (IUCN 3.1)

Scientific classification
- Kingdom: Plantae
- Clade: Tracheophytes
- Clade: Gymnosperms
- Division: Pinophyta
- Class: Pinopsida
- Order: Cupressales
- Family: Taxaceae
- Genus: Amentotaxus
- Species: A. formosana

Binomial name
- Amentotaxus formosana H.L.Li

Synonyms
- Amentotaxus yunnanensis var. formosana (H.L.Li) Silba

= Amentotaxus formosana =

Species of conifer

Amentotaxus formosana, the Taiwan catkin yew, is a species of conifer in the yew family, Taxaceae. It is a small tree to 10 m (33 ft) tall, with a slender trunk. It was previously recognised as a variant of Amentotaxus argotaenia.

Amentotaxus formosana is found only in Taiwan where it only occurs in four localities of cloud forest in the Hengchun Peninsula, in the extreme south of the island. IUCN considers A. formosana as critically endangered because of its populations are small and threatened by habitat loss. The populations are characterized by very low levels of genetic diversity.

The wood is used for making furniture and handicrafts, etc., and the species is sometimes cultivated as an ornamental tree.
