= Philyrophyllum =

Scientific classification
- Kingdom: Plantae
- Clade: Tracheophytes
- Clade: Angiosperms
- Clade: Eudicots
- Clade: Asterids
- Order: Asterales
- Family: Asteraceae
- Subfamily: Asteroideae
- Tribe: Athroismeae
- Genus: Philyrophyllum; O.Hoffm.

Genus of flowering plants

Philyrophyllum is a genus of African plants in the family Asteraceae.

Species

- Philyrophyllum brandbergense P.P.J.Herman - Namibia
- Philyrophyllum schinzii O.Hoffm. - South Africa, Namibia, Botswana, Zimbabwe
