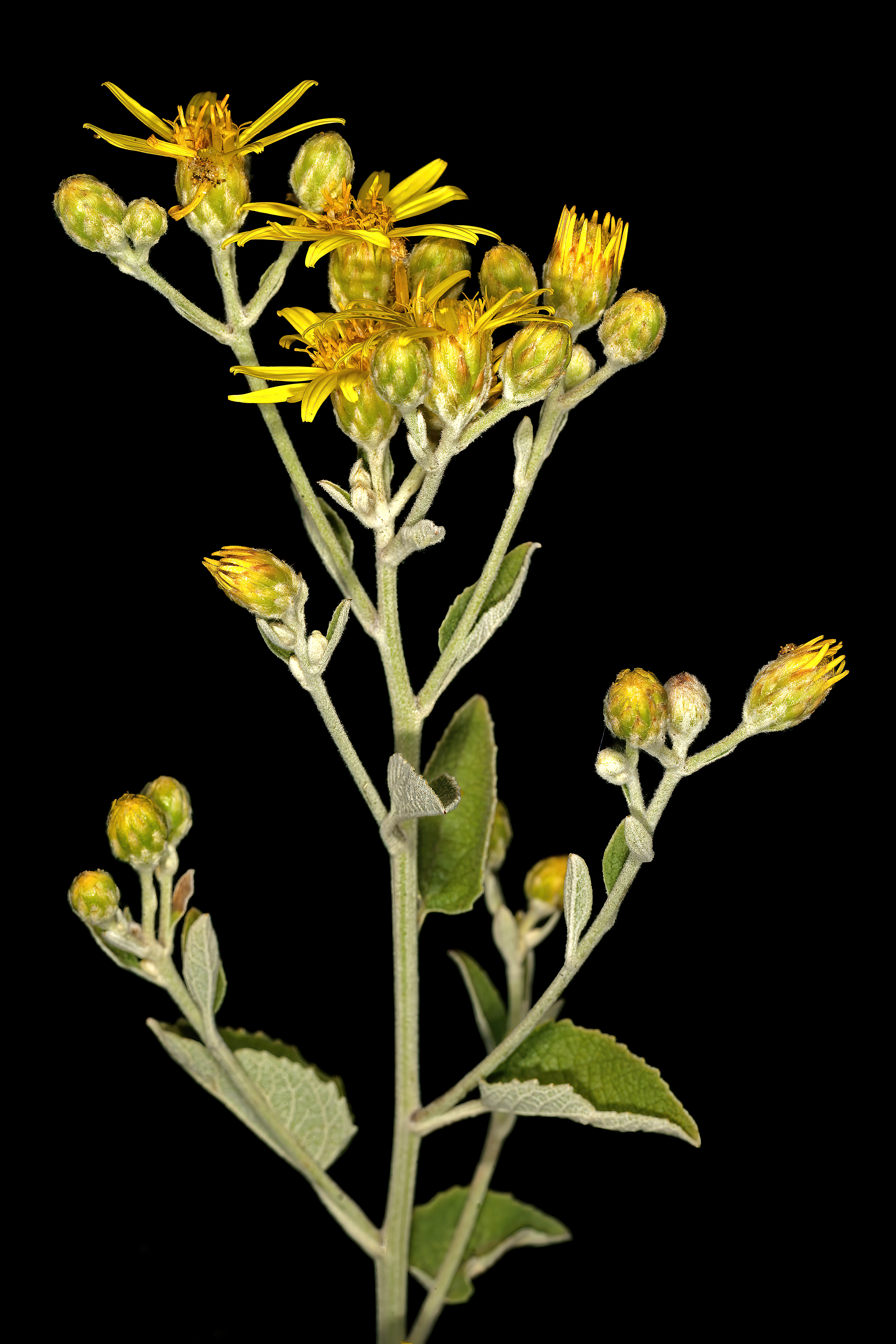
- Anisopappus junodii

Scientific classification
- Kingdom: Plantae
- Clade: Embryophytes
- Clade: Tracheophytes
- Clade: Spermatophytes
- Clade: Angiosperms
- Clade: Eudicots
- Clade: Asterids
- Order: Asterales
- Family: Asteraceae
- Subfamily: Asteroideae
- Tribe: Athroismeae
- Genus: Anisopappus; Hook. & Arn.

Synonyms
- Sphacophyllum Benth.; Astephania Oliv.; Temnolepis Baker; Eenia Hiern & S.Moore; Epallage DC.

= Anisopappus =

Genus of flowering plants

Anisopappus is a genus of flowering plants in the family Asteraceae.

The genus is primarily native to Africa and Madagascar, with one species (A. chinensis) extending into China and Southeast Asia.

Species

- Anisopappus abercornensis G.Taylor
- Anisopappus alticolus (Humbert) Wild
- Anisopappus anemonifolius (DC.) G.Taylor
- Anisopappus athanasioides Paiva & S.Ortiz
- Anisopappus bampsianus Lisowski
- Anisopappus boinensis (Humbert) Wild
- Anisopappus burundiensis Lisowski
- Anisopappus chinensis (L.) Hook. & Arn.
- Anisopappus corymbosus Wild
- Anisopappus davyi S.Moore
- Anisopappus discolor Wild
- Anisopappus exellii Wild
- Anisopappus fruticosus S.Ortiz & Paiva
- Anisopappus grangeoides (Vatke & Höpfner ex Klatt) Merxm.
- Anisopappus holstii (O.Hoffm.) Wild
- Anisopappus junodii Hutch.
- Anisopappus kirkii (Oliv.) Brenan
- Anisopappus latifolius (S.Moore) B.L.Burtt
- Anisopappus lawalreanus Lisowski
- Anisopappus lejolyanus Lisowski
- Anisopappus marianus Lawalrée
- Anisopappus orbicularis (Humbert) Wild
- Anisopappus paucidentatus Wild
- Anisopappus petitianus Lisowski
- Anisopappus pinnatifidus (Klatt) O.Hoffm. ex Hutch.
- Anisopappus pseudopinnatifidus S.Ortiz & Paiva
- Anisopappus pumilus (Hiern) Wild
- Anisopappus rhombifolius Wild
- Anisopappus robynsianus Lisowski
- Anisopappus salviifolius (DC.) Wild
- Anisopappus smutsii Hutch.
- Anisopappus sylvaticus (Humbert) Wild
- Anisopappus upembensis Lisowski
