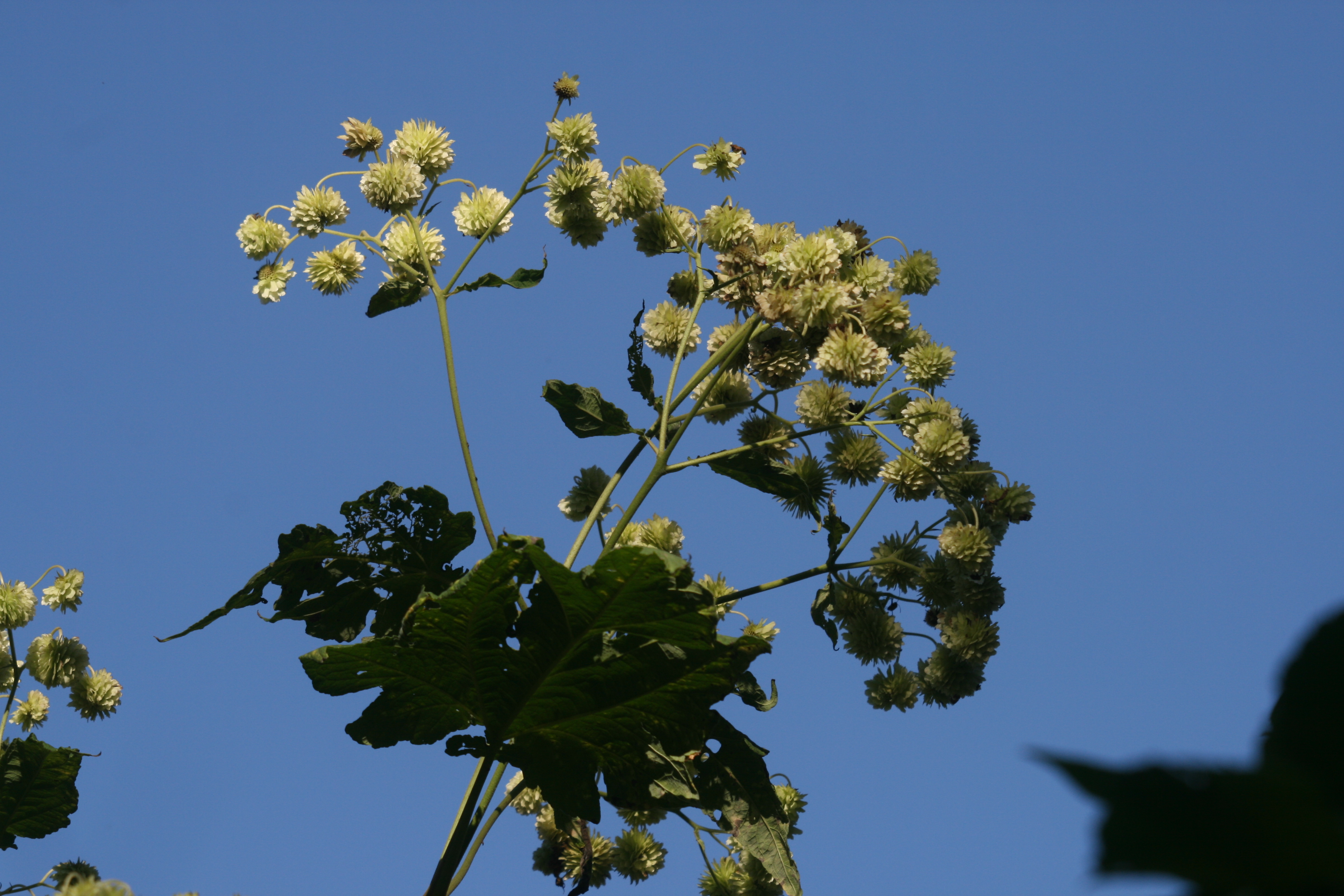
- Blepharispermum petiolare

Scientific classification
- Kingdom: Plantae
- Clade: Tracheophytes
- Clade: Angiosperms
- Clade: Eudicots
- Clade: Asterids
- Order: Asterales
- Family: Asteraceae
- Subfamily: Asteroideae
- Tribe: Athroismeae
- Genus: Blepharispermum; Wight ex DC.

= Blepharispermum =

Genus of flowering plants

Blepharispermum is a genus of flowering plants in the family Asteraceae. They are distributed in Africa, Madagascar, the Arabian Peninsula, India, and Sri Lanka.

These are shrubs and small trees. The leaf blades are sometimes borne on petioles, which may have spines. The flower head contains 2 female disc florets and 2 to 4 male disc florets. The latter are whitish, greenish, or yellowish. The fruit is a rough-edged cypsela with a pappus.

== Species ==
15 species are accepted.

- Blepharispermum arcuatum – Tanzania, Madagascar
- Blepharispermum brachycarphum – Tanzania, Mozambique
- Blepharispermum canescens – Tanzania
- Blepharispermum ellenbeckii – Ethiopia, Somalia, Sudan, Kenya
- Blepharispermum fruticosum – Ethiopia, Somalia
- Blepharispermum hirtum – Yemen, Oman
- Blepharispermum minus – Kenya
- Blepharispermum obovatum – Ethiopia
- Blepharispermum petiolare – Sri Lanka, Kerala, Tamil Nadu
- Blepharispermum pubescens – Kenya, Uganda, Tanzania, Rwanda, Zaire
- Blepharispermum spinulosum – Ivory Coast, Zaire
- Blepharispermum villosum – Ethiopia, Somalia, Kenya
- Blepharispermum xerothamnum – Tanzania
- Blepharispermum yemense – Yemen
- Blepharispermum zanguebaricum – Kenya

=== Formerly placed here ===
- Leucoblepharis subsessilis (DC.) Arn. (as Blepharispermum subsessile DC.)
