= Anisopappus pseudopinnatifidus =

Conservation status
- Least Concern (IUCN 3.1)

Scientific classification
- Kingdom: Plantae
- Clade: Tracheophytes
- Clade: Angiosperms
- Clade: Eudicots
- Clade: Asterids
- Order: Asterales
- Family: Asteraceae
- Genus: Anisopappus
- Species: A. pseudopinnatifidus

Binomial name
- Anisopappus pseudopinnatifidus S.Ortiz & Paiva

Species of flowering plant

Anisopappus pseudopinnatifidus is a species of flowering plant in the family Asteraceae. It is found only in Namibia. Its natural habitat is subtropical or tropical dry shrubland. Although the plant is listed on the IUCN Red List of Threatened Species, its population numbers are considered to be stable.
