= Cardosoa =

Scientific classification
- Kingdom: Plantae
- Clade: Tracheophytes
- Clade: Angiosperms
- Clade: Eudicots
- Clade: Asterids
- Order: Asterales
- Family: Asteraceae
- Subfamily: Asteroideae
- Tribe: Athroismeae
- Genus: Cardosoa; S.Ortiz & Paiva
- Species: C. athanasioides

Binomial name
- Cardosoa athanasioides (Paiva & S.Ortiz) S.Ortiz & Paiva

Genus of flowering plants

Cardosoa is a genus of flowering plants belonging to the family Asteraceae. It contains a single species, Cardosoa athanasioides.

Its native range is Angola.
