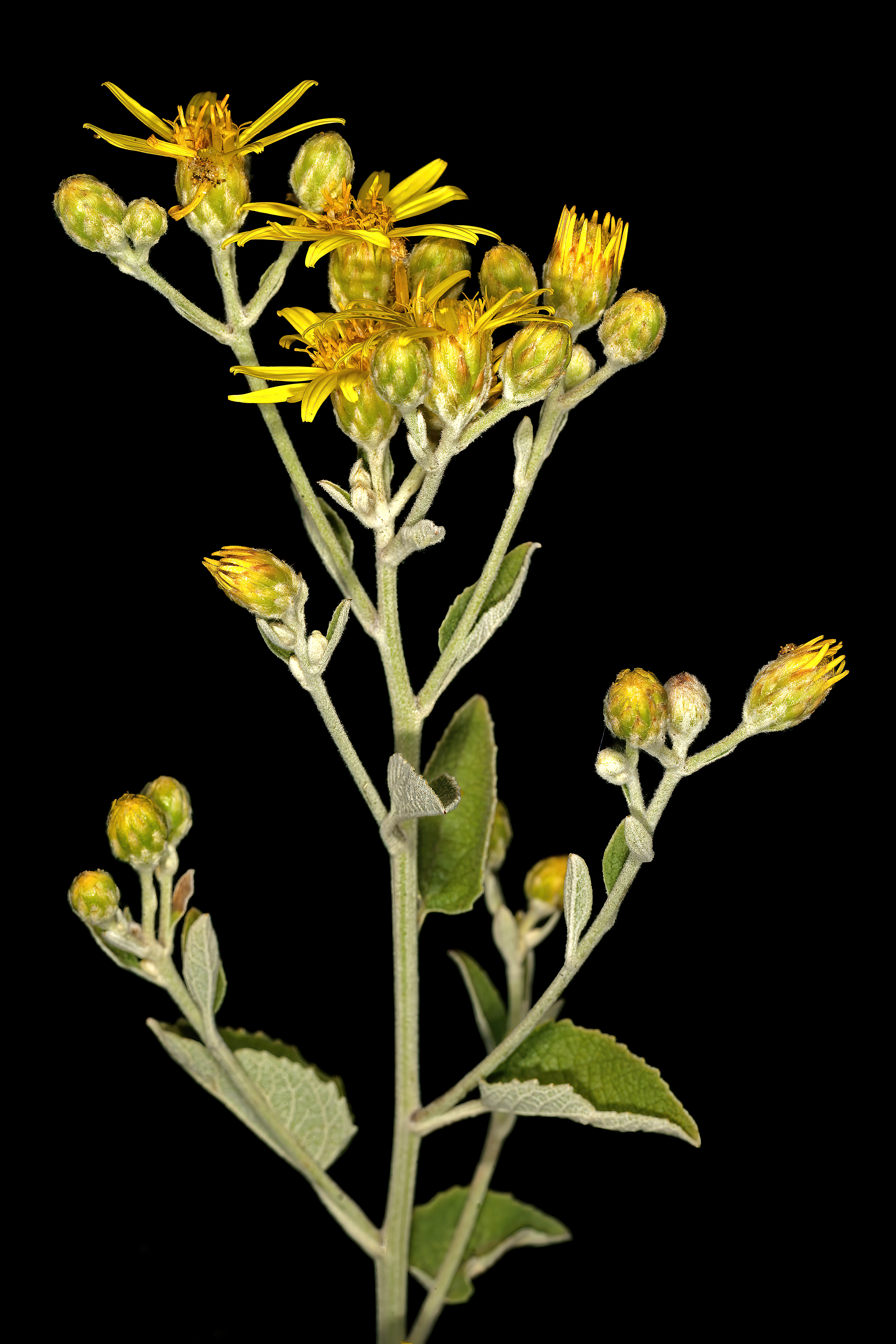
- Anisopappus junodii

Scientific classification
- Kingdom: Plantae
- Clade: Tracheophytes
- Clade: Angiosperms
- Clade: Eudicots
- Clade: Asterids
- Order: Asterales
- Family: Asteraceae
- Subfamily: Asteroideae
- Tribe: Athroismeae; Panero

= Athroismeae =

Tribe of plants

Athroismeae is a tribe of flowering plants in the subfamily Asteroideae of the family Asteraceae.

Athroismeae genera recognized by the Global Compositae Database as of May 2023:

- Anisochaeta DC.
- Anisopappus Hook. & Arn.
- Artemisiopsis S.Moore
- Athroisma DC.
- Blepharispermum Wight ex DC.
- Cardosoa S.Ortiz & Paiva
- Centipeda Lour.
- Leucoblepharis Arn.
- Lowryanthus Pruski
- Philyrophyllum O.Hoffm.
- Symphyllocarpus Maxim.
