= Amentotaxus hatuyenensis =

Conservation status
- Endangered (IUCN 3.1)

Scientific classification
- Kingdom: Plantae
- Clade: Tracheophytes
- Clade: Gymnosperms
- Division: Pinophyta
- Class: Pinopsida
- Order: Cupressales
- Family: Taxaceae
- Genus: Amentotaxus
- Species: A. hatuyenensis

Binomial name
- Amentotaxus hatuyenensis T.H.Nguyên

Species of conifer

Amentotaxus hatuyenensis is a species of conifer in the yew family, Taxaceae. It is a shrub or tree endemic to northern Vietnam.

This is an endangered species with a total population of fewer than 250 mature individuals limited to Hà Giang Province in northern Vietnam. They grow in various types of forest on karst formations. They may be found alongside conifers such as Pinus fenzeliana, Tsuga chinensis, Cephalotaxus mannii, Podocarpus neriifolius, Nageia fleuryi, and Podocarpus pilgeri. There are also many epiphytes such as orchids in the habitat.
