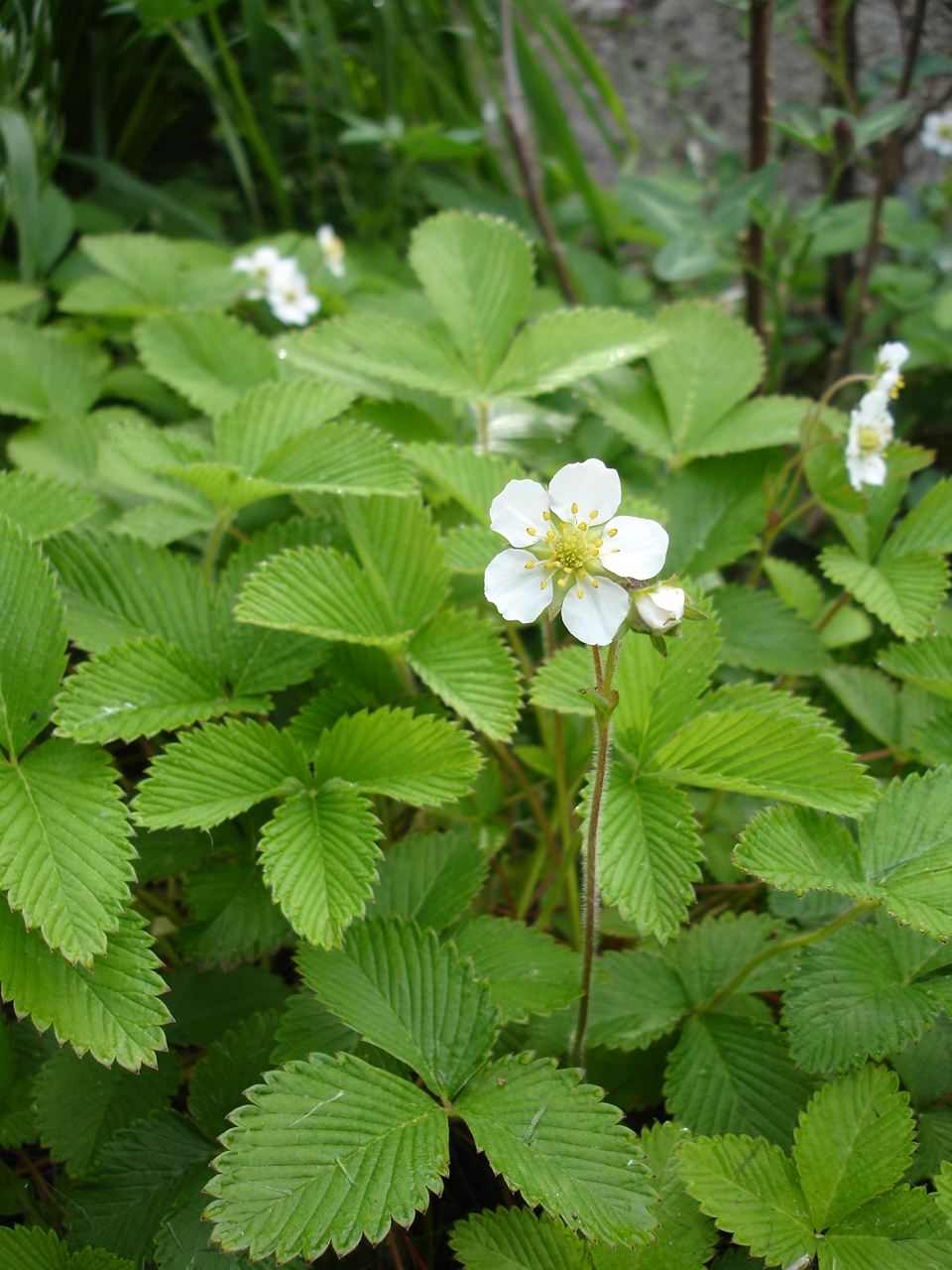

Scientific classification
- Kingdom: Plantae
- Clade: Embryophytes
- Clade: Tracheophytes
- Clade: Angiosperms
- Clade: Eudicots
- Clade: Rosids
- Order: Rosales
- Family: Rosaceae
- Genus: Fragaria
- Species: F. nipponica

Binomial name
- Fragaria nipponica Makino

= Fragaria nipponica =

Species of strawberry

Fragaria nipponica is a species of wild strawberry in the family Rosaceae. It is native to the western side of the Japanese island of Honshū, with a variety Fragaria nipponica var. yakusimensis on Yakushima. Some botanists treat it as a synonym of Fragaria yezoensis.

All strawberries have a base haploid count of 7 chromosomes. Fragaria nipponica is diploid, having 2 pairs of these chromosomes for a total of 14 chromosomes.

Fragaria nipponica, particularly var. yakusimensis, is cultivated in Japan for its edible fruit.

Genomic information
- NCBI ID: 101012
- Ploidy: diploid
- Number of chromosomes: 14
- Year of completion: 2014
