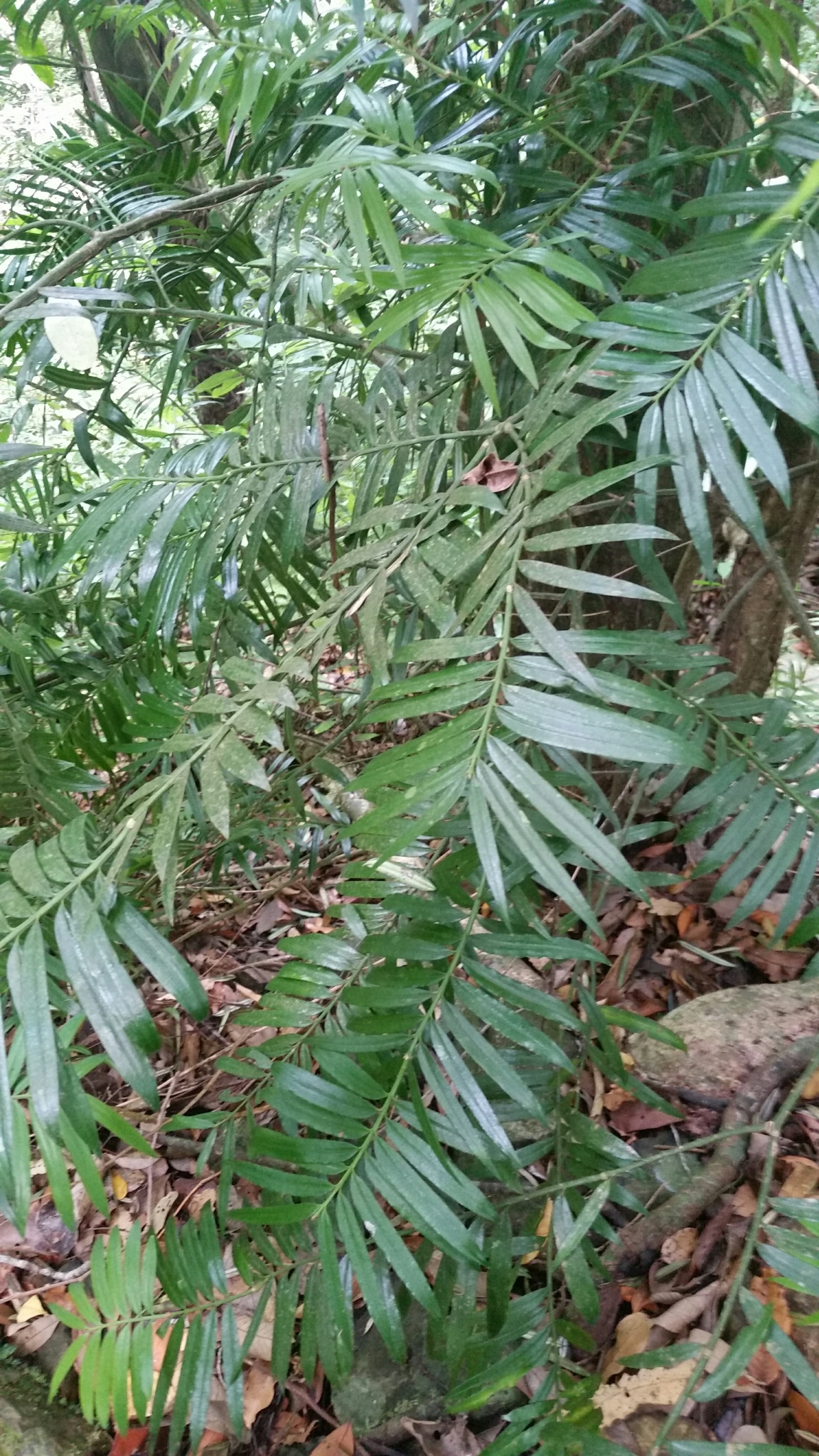
- Amentotaxus poilanei

Scientific classification
- Kingdom: Plantae
- Clade: Tracheophytes
- Clade: Gymnosperms
- Division: Pinophyta
- Class: Pinopsida
- Order: Cupressales
- Family: Taxaceae
- Genus: Amentotaxus; Pilg.

Type species
- Amentotaxus argotaenia (Hance) Pilg.

Species
- A. argotaenia; A. assamica; A. formosana; A. poilanei; A. yunnanensis

= Amentotaxus =

Amentotaxus Temporal range: Middle Jurassic–Recent

Genus of conifers

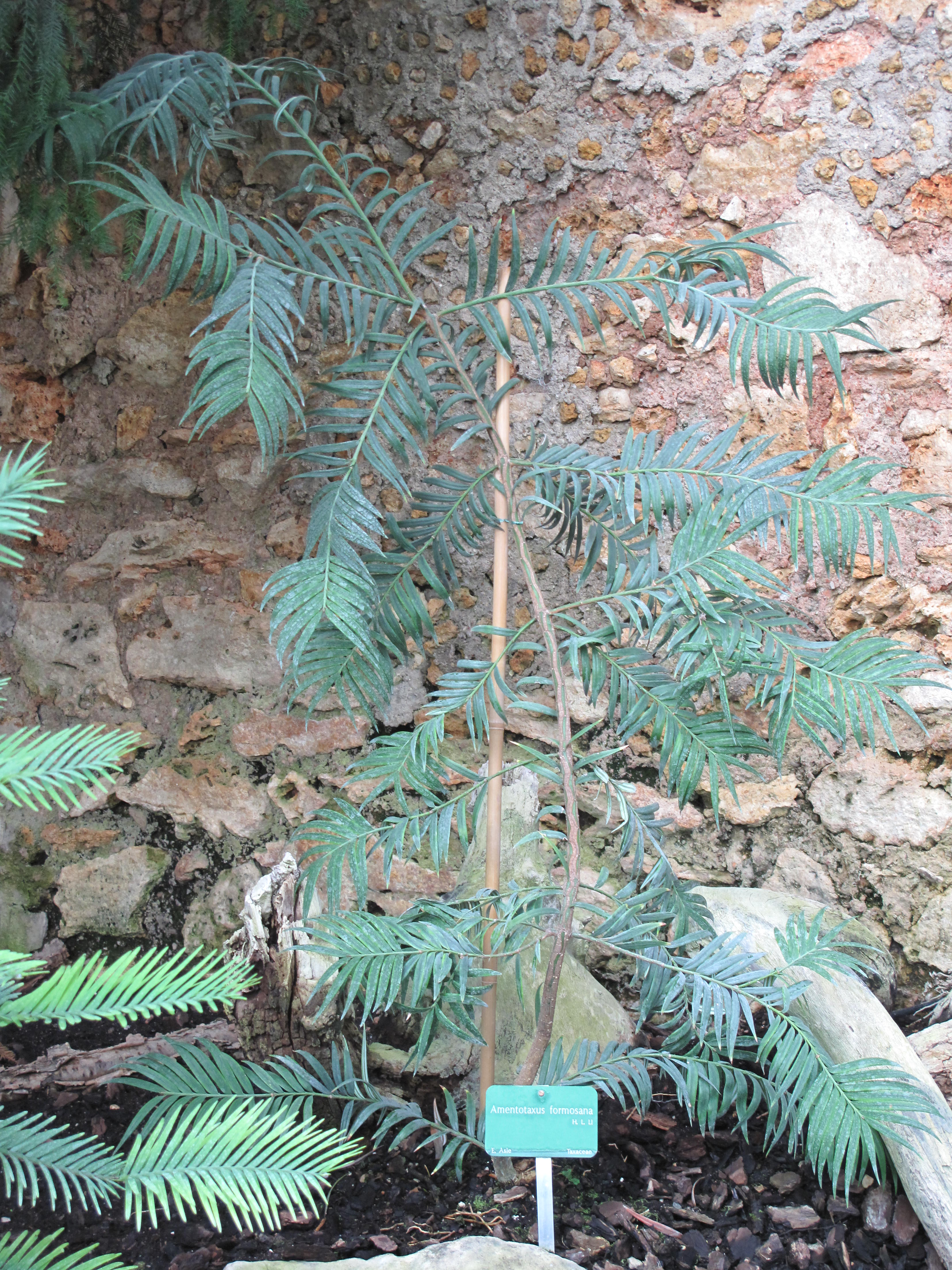
Amentotaxus formosana

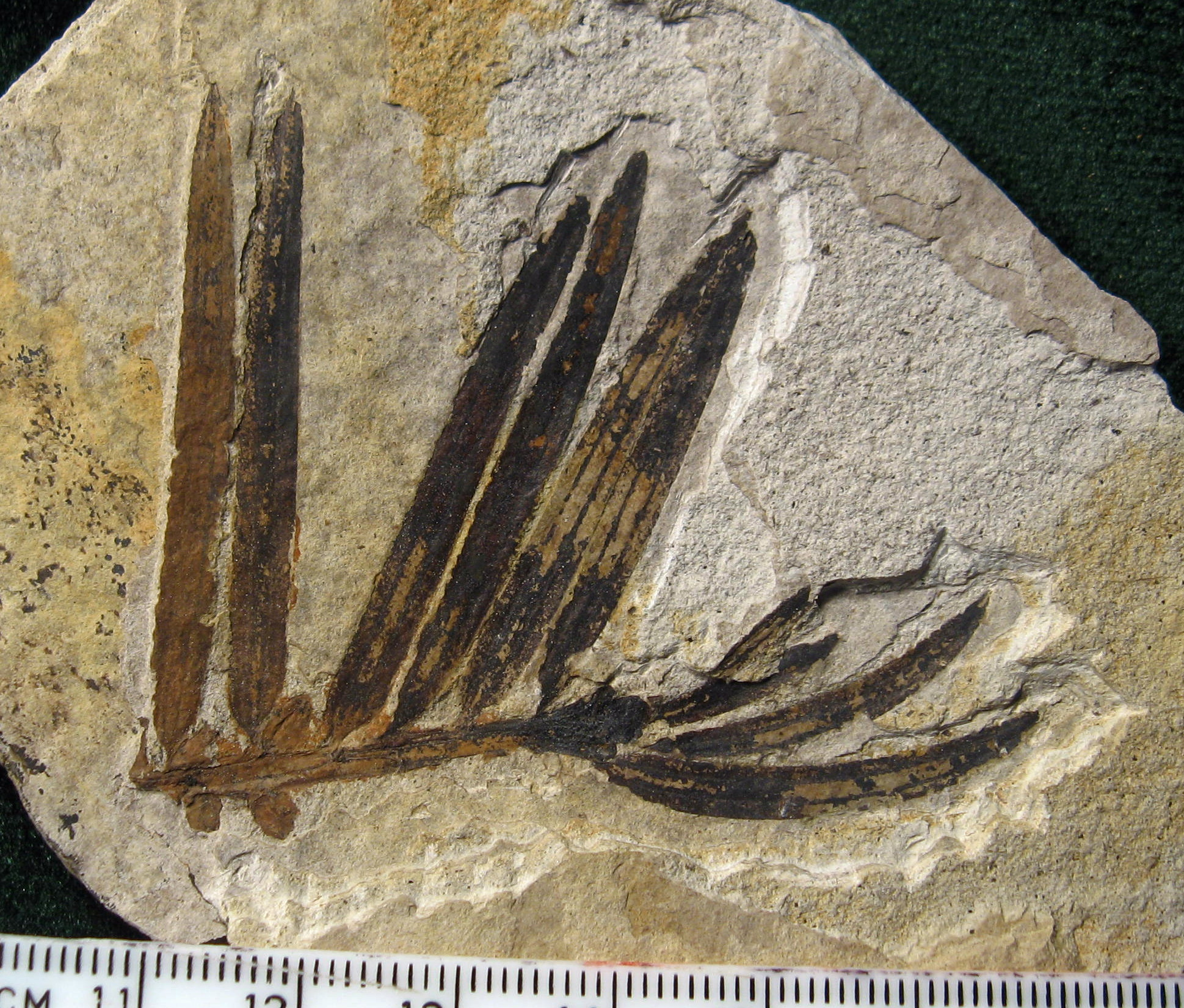
Amentotaxus fossil

Amentotaxus is a genus of conifers (catkin-yews) comprising five species, treated in the Taxaceae. The genus is native to subtropical Southeast Asia, from Taiwan west across southern China to Assam in the eastern Himalaya, and south to Vietnam. The species are evergreen shrubs and small trees reaching 2–15 m tall.

The leaves are spirally arranged on the shoots, but twisted at the base to lie in two flat ranks (except on erect leading shoots); they are linear-lanceolate, 4–12 cm long and 6–10 mm broad, soft in texture, with a blunt tip, green above, and with two conspicuous white stomatal bands below. They differ from the related genus Cephalotaxus in the broader leaves, and from Torreya by the blunt, not spine-tipped leaves.

The species can be either monoecious or dioecious; when monoecious, the male and female cones are often on different branches. The male (pollen) cones are catkin-like, 3–15 cm long, grouped in clusters of two to six together produced from a single bud. The female (seed) cones are single or grouped a few together on short stems; minute at first, they mature in about 18 months to a drupe-like structure with the single large nut-like seed 1.5–3 cm long surrounded by a fleshy covering, orange to red at full maturity; the apex of the seed usually protrudes slightly out of the fleshy covering.

The oldest fossils that are recognisable to the genus are from the Middle-Late Jurassic Daohugou Bed of China.

== Extant species ==
Phylogeny of Amentotaxus

- Amentotaxus
  - A. formosana Li
  - - A. argotaenia (Hance) Pilger
    - - A. poilanei (Ferré & Rouane) Ferguson
      - - A. hatuyenensis Nguyên
        - A. yunnanensis Li

Image	Scientific name	Common name	Distribution
	Amentotaxus argotaenia	Catkin yew	China: Fujian, southern Gansu, Guangdong, Guangxi, Guizhou, western Hubei, Hunan, Jiangsu, north-western Jiangxi, central and south-eastern Sichuan, south-eastern Tibet and southern Zhejiang
	Amentotaxus assamica	Assam catkin yew	India
	Amentotaxus formosana	Taiwan catkin yew	Taiwan
	Amentotaxus hatuyenensis		Vietnam
	Amentotaxus poilanei	Poilane's catkin yew	Vietnam
	Amentotaxus yunnanensis	Yunnan catkin yew	Laos, Vietnam, and Guizhou and Yunnan in China
