= Anisochaeta mikanioides =

Scientific classification
- Kingdom: Plantae
- Clade: Embryophytes
- Clade: Tracheophytes
- Clade: Angiosperms
- Clade: Eudicots
- Clade: Asterids
- Order: Asterales
- Family: Asteraceae
- Subfamily: Asteroideae
- Tribe: Athroismeae
- Genus: Anisochaeta; DC.
- Species: A. mikanioides

Binomial name
- Anisochaeta mikanioides DC.

Species of flowering plant

Anisochaeta is a genus of flowering plants in the daisy family (Asteraceae).

There is only one known species, Anisochaeta mikanioides, endemic to the Province of KwaZulu-Natal in South Africa.
