= Symphyllocarpus =

Scientific classification
- Kingdom: Plantae
- Clade: Tracheophytes
- Clade: Angiosperms
- Clade: Eudicots
- Clade: Asterids
- Order: Asterales
- Family: Asteraceae
- Subfamily: Asteroideae
- Tribe: Athroismeae
- Genus: Symphyllocarpus; Maxim.
- Species: S. exilis

Binomial name
- Symphyllocarpus exilis Maxim.

Genus of plants

Symphyllocarpus is a genus of flowering plants in the family Asteraceae. The genus is poorly known, and botanists have not reached a consensus as to its evolutionary relations.

Species

The only known species is Symphyllocarpus exilis, native to northeastern China (Jilin, Heilongjiang) and southeastern Russia (Amur, Primorye, Irkutsk).
