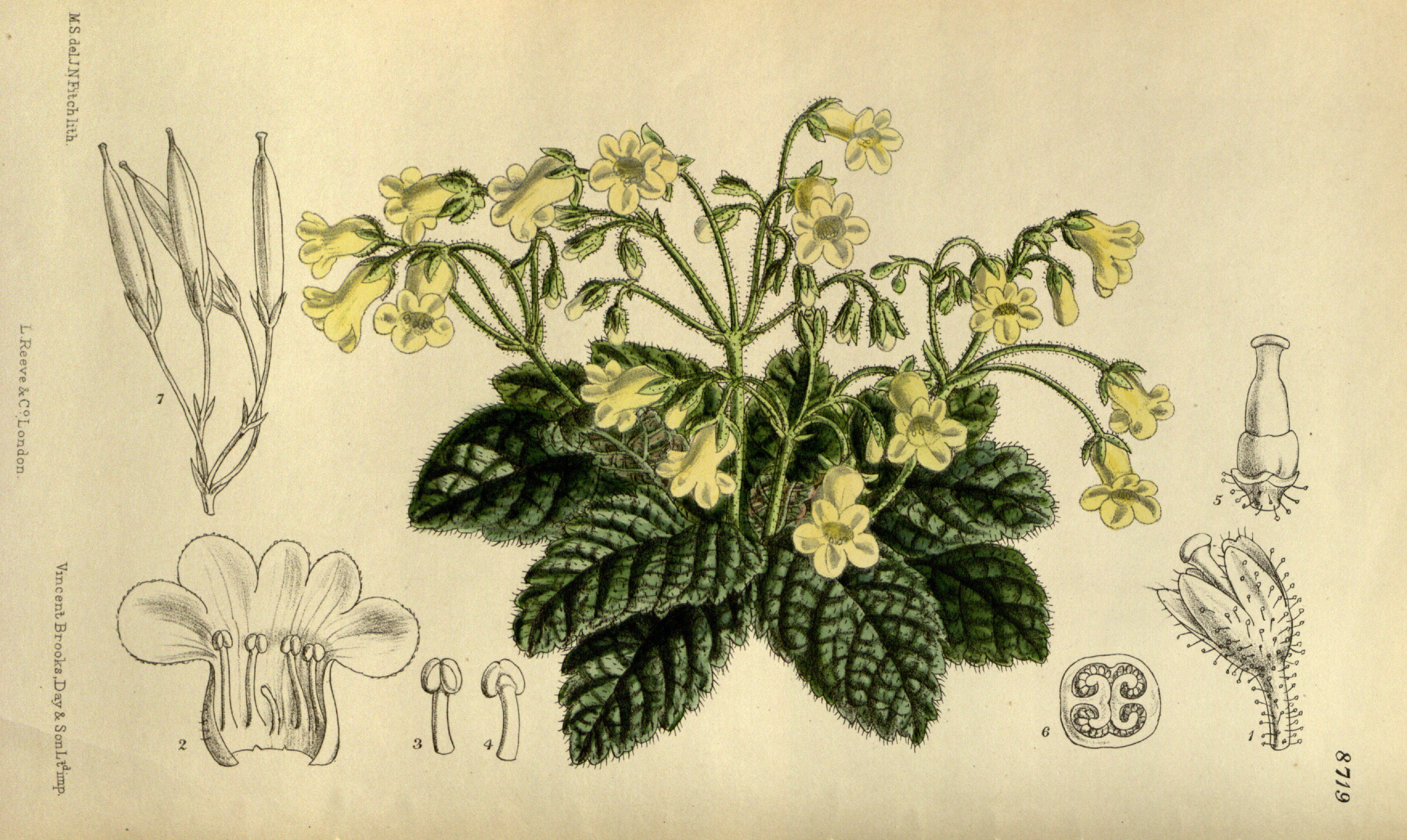
- Oreocharis forrestii

Scientific classification
- Kingdom: Plantae
- Clade: Tracheophytes
- Clade: Angiosperms
- Clade: Eudicots
- Clade: Asterids
- Order: Lamiales
- Family: Gesneriaceae
- Genus: Oreocharis; Benth. (1876), nom. cons.

Species
- 154; see text

Synonyms
- Ancylostemon Craib (1919); × Brigandra O.Schwarz ex Jungn. (1984); Briggsia Craib (1919); Dasydesmus Craib (1919); Dayaoshania W.T.Wang (1983); Deinocheilos W.T.Wang (1986); × Gomiocharis O.Schwarz (1977), not validly publ.; Isometrum Craib (1919); Opithandra B.L.Burtt (1956); Paraisometrum W.T.Wang (1997 publ. 1998); Perantha Craib (1918); Schistolobos W.T.Wang (1983); Thamnocharis W.T.Wang (1981); Tremacron Craib (1918)

= Oreocharis (plant) =

Genus of flowering plants

Oreocharis is a genus of flowering plants in the family Gesneriaceae. It includes 154 species native to Asia, which range from the Eastern Himalayas and Tibet through Indochina and China to Japan.

== Species ==
154 species are accepted.

- Oreocharis acaulis (Merr.) Mich.Möller & A.Weber
- Oreocharis acutiloba (K.Y.Pan) Mich.Möller & W.H.Chen
- Oreocharis agnesiae (Forrest ex W.W.Sm.) Mich.Möller & W.H.Chen
- Oreocharis aimodisca Lei Cai, Z.L.Dao & F.Wen
- Oreocharis amabilis Dunn
- Oreocharis argentifolia Lei Cai & Z.L.Dao
- Oreocharis argyreia Chun ex K.Y.Pan
- Oreocharis argyrophylla W.H.Chen, H.Q.Nguyen & Y.M.Shui
- Oreocharis aurantiaca Baill.
- Oreocharis aurea Dunn
- Oreocharis auricula (S.Moore) C.B.Clarke
- Oreocharis baolianis (Q.W.Lin) Li H.Yang & M.Kang
- Oreocharis begoniifolia (H.W.Li) Mich.Möller & A.Weber
- Oreocharis benthamii C.B.Clarke
- Oreocharis billburttii Mich.Möller & W.H.Chen
- Oreocharis blepharophylla W.H.Chen, H.Q.Nguyen & Y.M.Shui
- Oreocharis bodinieri H.Lév.
- Oreocharis brachypodus J.M.Li & Zhi M.Li
- Oreocharis bullata (W.T.Wang & K.Y.Pan) Mich.Möller & A.Weber
- Oreocharis burtii (W.T.Wang) Mich.Möller & A.Weber
- Oreocharis caobangensis T.V.Do, Y.G.Wei & F.Wen
- Oreocharis cavalieri H.Lév.
- Oreocharis chenzhouensis X.L.Yu, R.H.Tu & A.Liu
- Oreocharis chienii (Chun) Mich.Möller & A.Weber
- Oreocharis cinerea (W.T.Wang) Mich.Möller & A.Weber
- Oreocharis cinnamomea J.Anthony
- Oreocharis concava (Craib) Mich.Möller & A.Weber
- Oreocharis convexa (Craib) Mich.Möller & A.Weber
- Oreocharis cordatula (Craib) Pellegr.
- Oreocharis cotinifolia (W.T.Wang) Mich.Möller & A.Weber
- Oreocharis craibii Mich.Möller & A.Weber
- Oreocharis crenata (K.Y.Pan) Mich.Möller & A.Weber
- Oreocharis crispata W.H.Chen & Y.M.Shui
- Oreocharis curvituba J.J.Wei & W.B.Xu
- Oreocharis dalzielii (W.W.Sm.) Mich.Möller & A.Weber
- Oreocharis dasyantha Chun
- Oreocharis dayaoshanioides Yan Liu & W.B.Xu
- Oreocharis delavayi Baill.
- Oreocharis dentata A.L.Weitzman & L.E.Skog
- Oreocharis dimorphosepala (W.H.Chen & Y.M.Shui) Mich.Möller
- Oreocharis dinghushanensis (W.T.Wang) Mich.Möller & A.Weber
- Oreocharis duyunensis Z.Y.Li, X.G.Xiang & Z.Y.Guo
- Oreocharis elegantissima (H.Lév. & Vaniot) Mich.Möller & W.H.Chen
- Oreocharis eriocarpa W.H.Chen & Y.M.Shui
- Oreocharis esquirolii H.Lév.
- Oreocharis eximia (Chun ex K.Y.Pan) Mich.Möller & A.Weber
- Oreocharis fargesii (Franch.) Mich.Möller & A.Weber
- Oreocharis farreri (Craib) Mich.Möller & A.Weber
- Oreocharis flabellata (C.Y.Wu ex H.W.Li) Mich.Möller & A.Weber
- Oreocharis flavida Merr.
- Oreocharis flavovirens Xin Hong
- Oreocharis forrestii (Diels) Skan
- Oreocharis fulva W.H.Chen & Y.M.Shui
- Oreocharis gamosepala (K.Y.Pan) Mich.Möller & A.Weber
- Oreocharis georgei J.Anthony
- Oreocharis giraldii (Diels) Mich.Möller & A.Weber
- Oreocharis glandulosa (Batalin) Mich.Möller & A.Weber
- Oreocharis grandiflora W.H.Chen, Q.H.Nguyen & Y.M.Shui
- Oreocharis guangwushanensis Z.L.Li & Xin Hong
- Oreocharis guileana (B.L.Burtt) Li H.Yang & F.Wen
- Oreocharis hainanensis S.J.Ling & M.X.Ren
- Oreocharis hekouensis (Y.M.Shui & W.H.Chen) Mich.Möller & A.Weber
- Oreocharis henryana Oliv.
- Oreocharis heterandra D.Fang & D.H.Qin
- Oreocharis hirsuta Barnett
- Oreocharis hongheensis (W.H.Chen & Y.M.Shui) Mich.Möller
- Oreocharis humilis (W.T.Wang) Mich.Möller & A.Weber
- Oreocharis jasminina S.J.Ling, F.Wen & M.X.Ren
- Oreocharis jiangxiensis (W.T.Wang) Mich.Möller & A.Weber
- Oreocharis jinpingensis W.H.Chen & Y.M.Shui
- Oreocharis lacerata W.H.Chen & Y.M.Shui
- Oreocharis lancifolia (Franch.) Mich.Möller & A.Weber
- Oreocharis latisepala (Chun ex K.Y.Pan) Mich.Möller & W.H.Chen
- Oreocharis leucantha (Diels) Mich.Möller & A.Weber
- Oreocharis longifolia (Craib) Mich.Möller & A.Weber
- Oreocharis longipedicellata Lei Cai & F.Wen
- Oreocharis longituba W.H.Chen, Q.H.Nguyen & Y.M.Shui
- Oreocharis lungshengensis (W.T.Wang) Mich.Möller & A.Weber
- Oreocharis magnidens Chun ex K.Y.Pan
- Oreocharis mairei H.Lév.
- Oreocharis maximowiczii C.B.Clarke
- Oreocharis mileensis (W.T.Wang) Mich.Möller & A.Weber
- Oreocharis minor (Craib) Pellegr.
- Oreocharis muscicola (Diels) Mich.Möller & A.Weber
- Oreocharis nanchuanica (K.Y.Pan & Z.Y.Liu) Mich.Möller & A.Weber
- Oreocharis nanlingensis (Shi, X. Z., Sun, Z. X., Fu, J. X., & Yang, L. H. (2026)
- Oreocharis nemoralis Chun
- Oreocharis ninglangensis W.H.Chen & Y.M.Shui
- Oreocharis notochlaena (H.Lév. & Vaniot) H.Lév.
- Oreocharis obliqua C.Y.Wu ex H.W.Li
- Oreocharis obliquifolia (K.Y.Pan) Mich.Möller & A.Weber
- Oreocharis obtusidentata (W.T.Wang) Mich.Möller & A.Weber
- Oreocharis odontopetala Q.Fu & Y.Q.Wang
- Oreocharis ovata L.H.Yang, L.X.Zhou & M.Kang
- Oreocharis ovatilobata Q.Fu & Y.Q.Wang
- Oreocharis pankaiyuae Mich.Möller & A.Weber
- Oreocharis panzhouensis Lei Cai, Y.Guo & F.Wen
- Oreocharis parva Mich.Möller & W.H.Chen
- Oreocharis parviflora Lei Cai & Z.K.Wu
- Oreocharis parvifolia (K.Y.Pan) Mich.Möller & W.H.Chen
- Oreocharis phuongii T.V.Do
- Oreocharis pilosopetiolata Li H.Yang & M.Kang
- Oreocharis pinfaensis (H.Lév.) Mich.Möller & W.H.Chen
- Oreocharis pinnatilobata (K.Y.Pan) Mich.Möller & A.Weber
- Oreocharis polyneura Y.H.Tan, F.Wen & Y.X.Gong
- Oreocharis primuliflora (Batalin) Mich.Möller & A.Weber
- Oreocharis primuloides (Miq.) C.B.Clarke
- Oreocharis pumila (W.T.Wang) Mich.Möller & A.Weber
- Oreocharis purpurata B.Pan, M.Q.Han & Yan Liu
- Oreocharis qianyuensis Lei Cai, J.W.Yang & Q.Zhang
- Oreocharis repenticaulis X.K.Huang, P.Yang & Yan Liu
- Oreocharis reticuliflora Li H.Yang & X.Z.Shi
- Oreocharis rhombifolia (K.Y.Pan) Mich.Möller & A.Weber
- Oreocharis rhytidophylla C.Y.Wu ex H.W.Li
- Oreocharis ronganensis (K.Y.Pan) Mich.Möller & A.Weber
- Oreocharis rosthornii (Diels) Mich.Möller & A.Weber
- Oreocharis rotundifolia K.Y.Pan
- Oreocharis rubra (Hand.-Mazz.) Mich.Möller & A.Weber
- Oreocharis rubrostriata F.Wen & L.E Yang
- Oreocharis rufescens D.J.Middleton
- Oreocharis saxatilis (Hemsl.) Mich.Möller & A.Weber
- Oreocharis shweliensis Mich.Möller & W.H.Chen
- Oreocharis sichuanensis (W.T.Wang) Mich.Möller & A.Weber
- Oreocharis sichuanica (K.Y.Pan) Mich.Möller & A.Weber
- Oreocharis sinohenryi (Chun) Mich.Möller & A.Weber
- Oreocharis speciosa (Hemsl.) Mich.Möller & W.H.Chen
- Oreocharis stenosiphon Mich.Möller & A.Weber
- Oreocharis stewardii (Chun) Mich.Möller & A.Weber
- Oreocharis striata F.Wen & C.Z.Yang
- Oreocharis synergia W.H.Chen, Y.M.Shui & Mich.Möller
- Oreocharis tetraptera F.Wen, B.Pan & T.V.Do
- Oreocharis thanhii T.P.A.Tran, K.S.Nguyen & K.Tan
- Oreocharis tianlinensis R.C.Hu, W.B.Xu & Y.Feng Huang
- Oreocharis tongtchouanensis Mich.Möller & W.H.Chen
- Oreocharis tribracteata Bramley, H.J.Atkins & Mich.Möller
- Oreocharis trichantha (B.L.Burtt & R.A.Davidson) Mich.Möller & A.Weber
- Oreocharis tsaii Y.H.Tan & Jian W.Li
- Oreocharis tubicella Franch.
- Oreocharis tubiflora K.Y.Pan
- Oreocharis uniflora Li H.Yang & M.Kang
- Oreocharis urceolata (K.Y.Pan) Mich.Möller & A.Weber
- Oreocharis villosa (K.Y.Pan) Mich.Möller & A.Weber
- Oreocharis vulpina (B.L.Burtt & R.A.Davidson) Mich.Möller & A.Weber
- Oreocharis wangwentsaii Mich.Möller & A.Weber
- Oreocharis wanshanensis (S.Z.He) Mich.Möller & A.Weber
- Oreocharis wenshanensis W.H.Chen & Y.M.Shui
- Oreocharis wentsaii (Z.Yu Li) Mich.Möller & A.Weber
- Oreocharis wenxianensis Xiao J.Liu & X.G.Sun
- Oreocharis wumengensis Lei Cai & Z.L.Dao
- Oreocharis wuxiensis C.Xiong, Feng Chen bis & F.Wen
- Oreocharis xiangguiensis W.T.Wang & K.Y.Pan
- Oreocharis xieyongii T.Deng, D.G.Zhang & H.Sun
- Oreocharis yangjifengensis F.Wen & B.Chen
- Oreocharis yunnanensis Rossini & J.Freitas
- Oreocharis zhenpingensis J.M.Li, Ting Wang & Y.G.Zhang
