= Pseudotaxus =

Conservation status
- Vulnerable (IUCN 3.1)

Scientific classification
- Kingdom: Plantae
- Clade: Tracheophytes
- Clade: Gymnosperms
- Division: Pinophyta
- Class: Pinopsida
- Order: Cupressales
- Family: Taxaceae
- Genus: Pseudotaxus; W.C.Cheng
- Species: P. chienii

Binomial name
- Pseudotaxus chienii (W.C.Cheng) W.C.Cheng

Monotypic genus of conifer in the yew family

Pseudotaxus chienii, known commonly as the whiteberry yew (Chinese: 白豆杉; pinyin: báidòushān; lit. 'white bean conifer'), is a species of conifer in the yew family, Taxaceae. It is the sole species in the genus Pseudotaxus, but is closely related to the other yews in the genus Taxus. It is endemic to southern China, occurring in northern Guangdong, northern Guangxi, Hunan, Southwest Jiangxi, and southern Zhejiang.

Like other yews, it is a small coniferous shrub or small tree, reaching 2–5 m (6 ft 7 in – 16 ft 5 in) tall with reddish bark. The leaves are lanceolate, flat, 1–2.6 cm long and 2–3 mm broad, dark green above, with two white stomatal bands below; they are arranged spirally on the stem, but with the leaf bases twisted to align the leaves in two flat rows either side of the stem. The conspicuous white stomatal bands on the harder, stiffer (less soft) leaves readily distinguish it from the yews in the genus Taxus.

It is dioecious, with the male and female cones on different trees. The female (seed) cones are very similar to those of Taxus species, but the aril is white when mature, not red; they are 5–7 mm long and wide. The male (pollen) cones are globose, 3–4 mm diameter.

It is grown as an ornamental plant in southern China and occasionally elsewhere.
