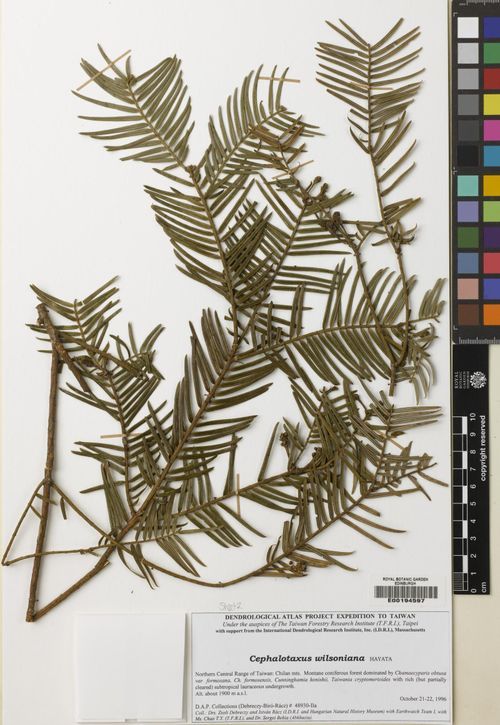
- Specimen E00194597

Conservation status
- Endangered (IUCN 3.1)

Scientific classification
- Kingdom: Plantae
- Clade: Tracheophytes
- Clade: Gymnosperms
- Division: Pinophyta
- Class: Pinopsida
- Order: Cupressales
- Family: Cephalotaxaceae
- Genus: Cephalotaxus
- Species: C. harringtonii
- Variety: C. h. var. wilsoniana

Trinomial name
- Cephalotaxus harringtonii var. wilsoniana (Hayata) Kitam.

Synonyms
- Cephalotaxus sinensis subsp. wilsoniana (Hayata) Silba; Cephalotaxus sinensis var. wilsoniana (Hayata) L.K.Fu & Nan Li; Cephalotaxus wilsoniana Hayata

= Cephalotaxus harringtonii var. wilsoniana =

Variety of conifer

Cephalotaxus harringtonii var. wilsoniana, commonly known as Taiwan plum yew, Taiwan cow's-tail pine, and Wilson plum yew, is an endangered variety of conifer in the family Cephalotaxaceae, endemic to Taiwan.

== Taxonomy ==
This variety was first described in 1914 by Bunzō Hayata as the species Cephalotaxus wilsoniana, and then redescribed in 1974 by Siro Kitamura to give its current name as a variety of Cephalotaxus harringtonii, (and who describes it as being found in Japan, Korea, North and Middle China).

Plants of the World Online and other authorities consider it to be the species Cephalotaxus harringtonii. (In synonymising this name with C. harringtonia, Plants of the World online cites several authorities.)

=== Etymology ===
The genus name Cephalotaxus comes from the Greek "kephale", meaning head. The taxus refers to the yew plant. Together these names mean "head yew" which is in reference to the flower structures of both sexes that appear as tight clusters or heads. The needle like leaves resemble a yew thus the name "head yew". The common name plum yew comes from the cones that resemble a plum in both shape and color.

=== History ===
The Taiwan plum yew was originally considered as a variety of Cephalotaxus sinensis due to similar morphology, however DNA evidence suggests that it is more closely related to its related cousin Cephalotaxus harringtonii. It has also been considered as a separate species. However, Plants of the World Online does not recognize the Taiwan plum yew as a distinct taxon, and considers it a synonym of the parent species, Cephalotaxus harringtonii.

== Description ==
The foliage is similar to true yews. The leaves are arranged in a "v"-shaped linear row on the stem, and on the base of the stem the leaves are arranged in a spiral. The foliage is a rich green when mature. New shoots are a bright green and darken after three to four years.

This conifer grows up to 9 m (30 ft) tall with drooping branches and reddish-brown flaky bark. It grows in scattered populations in the woodlands of Taiwan. It is sometimes cultivated in local gardens.

Its wood is light yellowish brown with dense structure and excellent quality, which can be used for construction, furniture, agricultural appliances. A variety of plant alkaloids can be extracted from leaves, branches, roots and seeds.

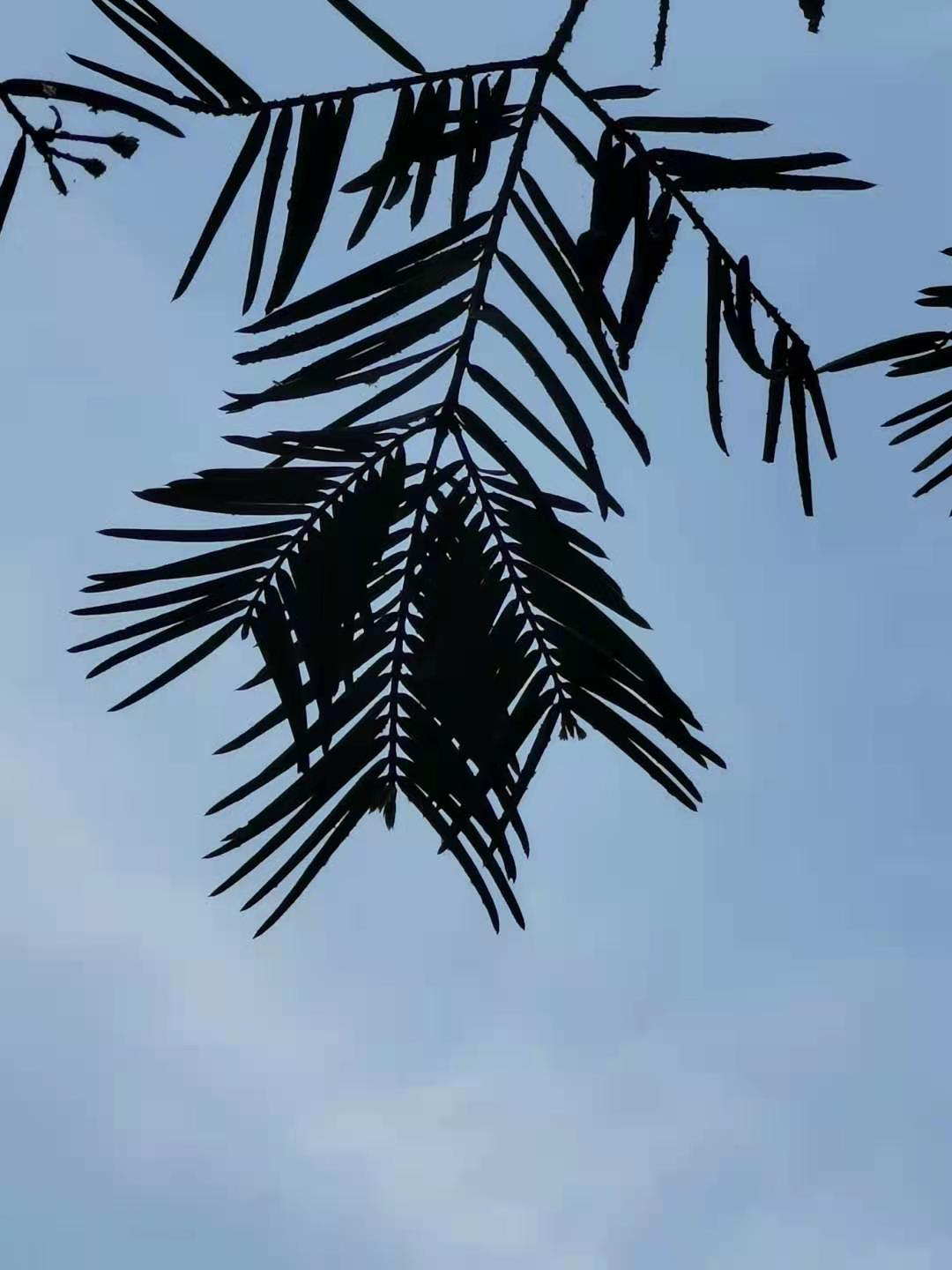
The buds/new branches at the front end of each branch are often three.

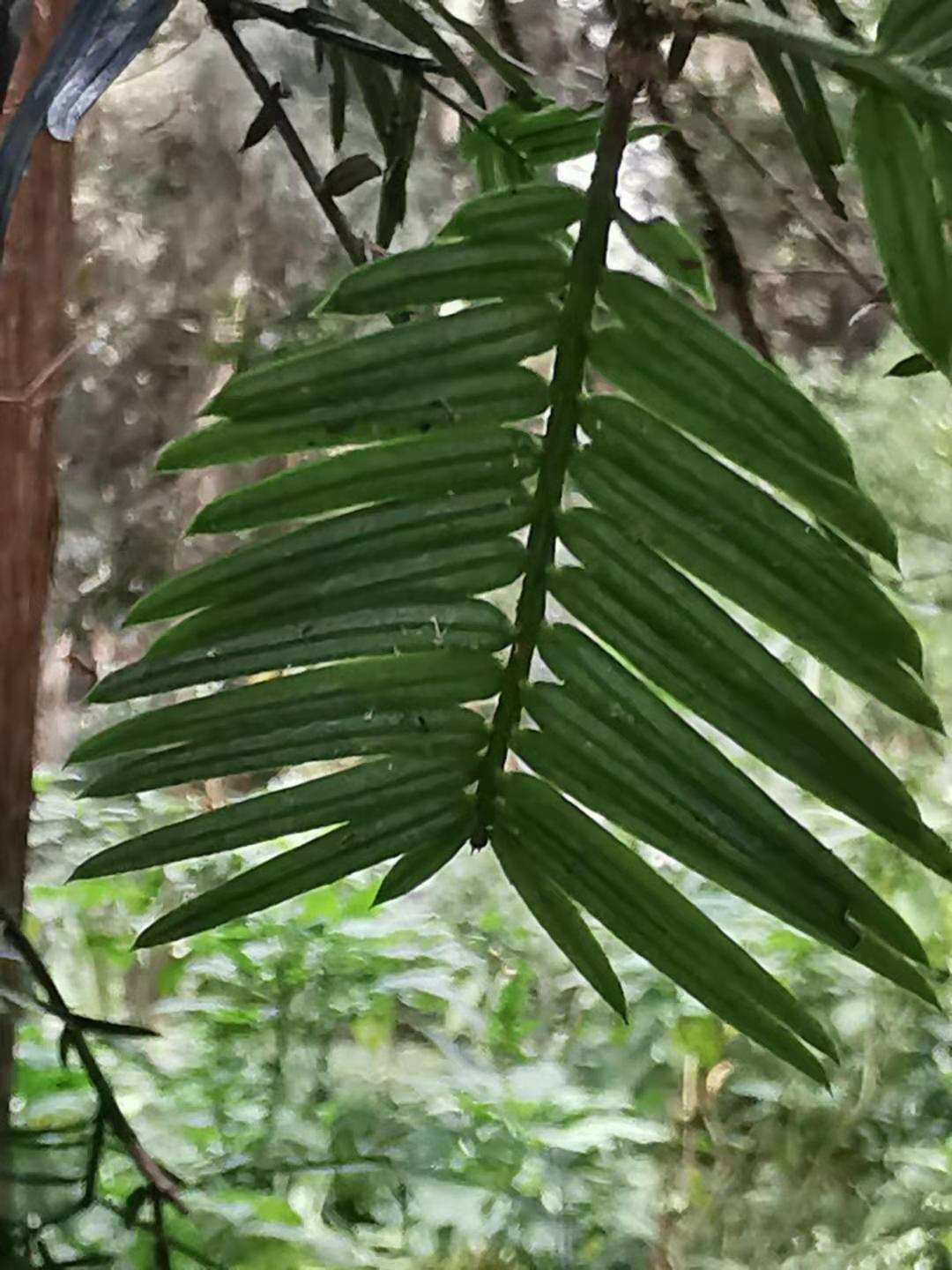
The stomata on the back of the leaf form two light green bands.

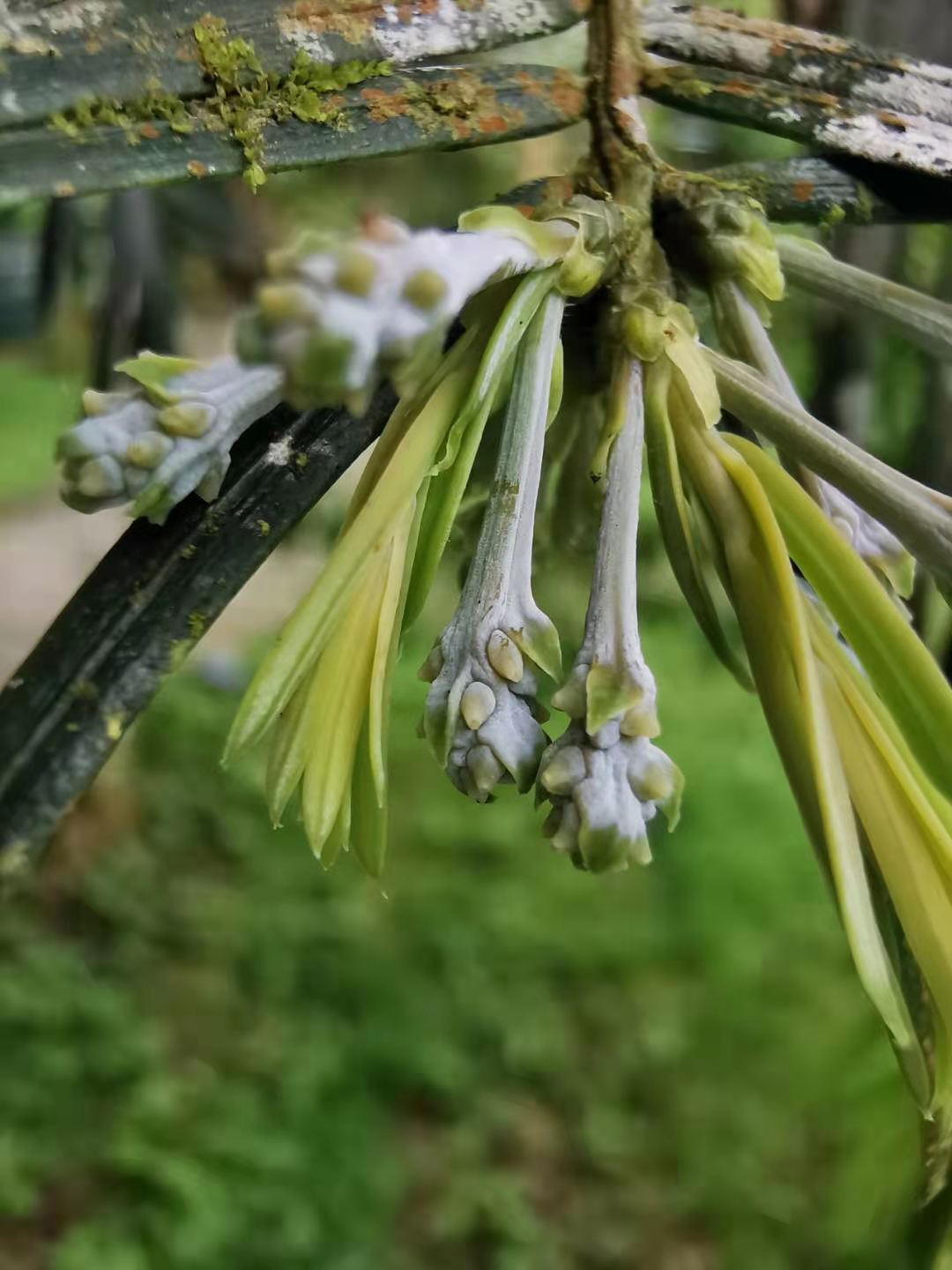
Female inflorescence

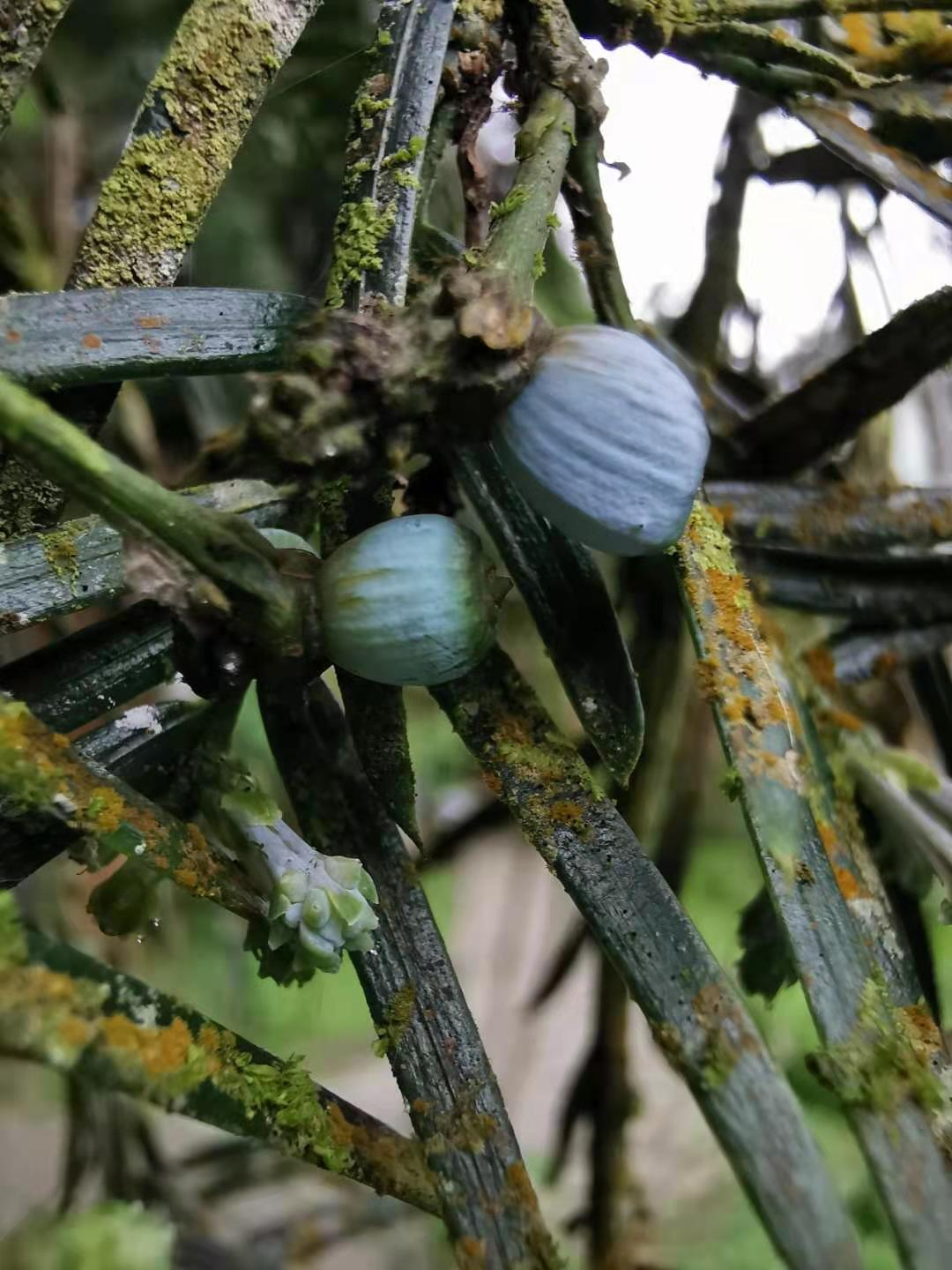
"Naked seed"

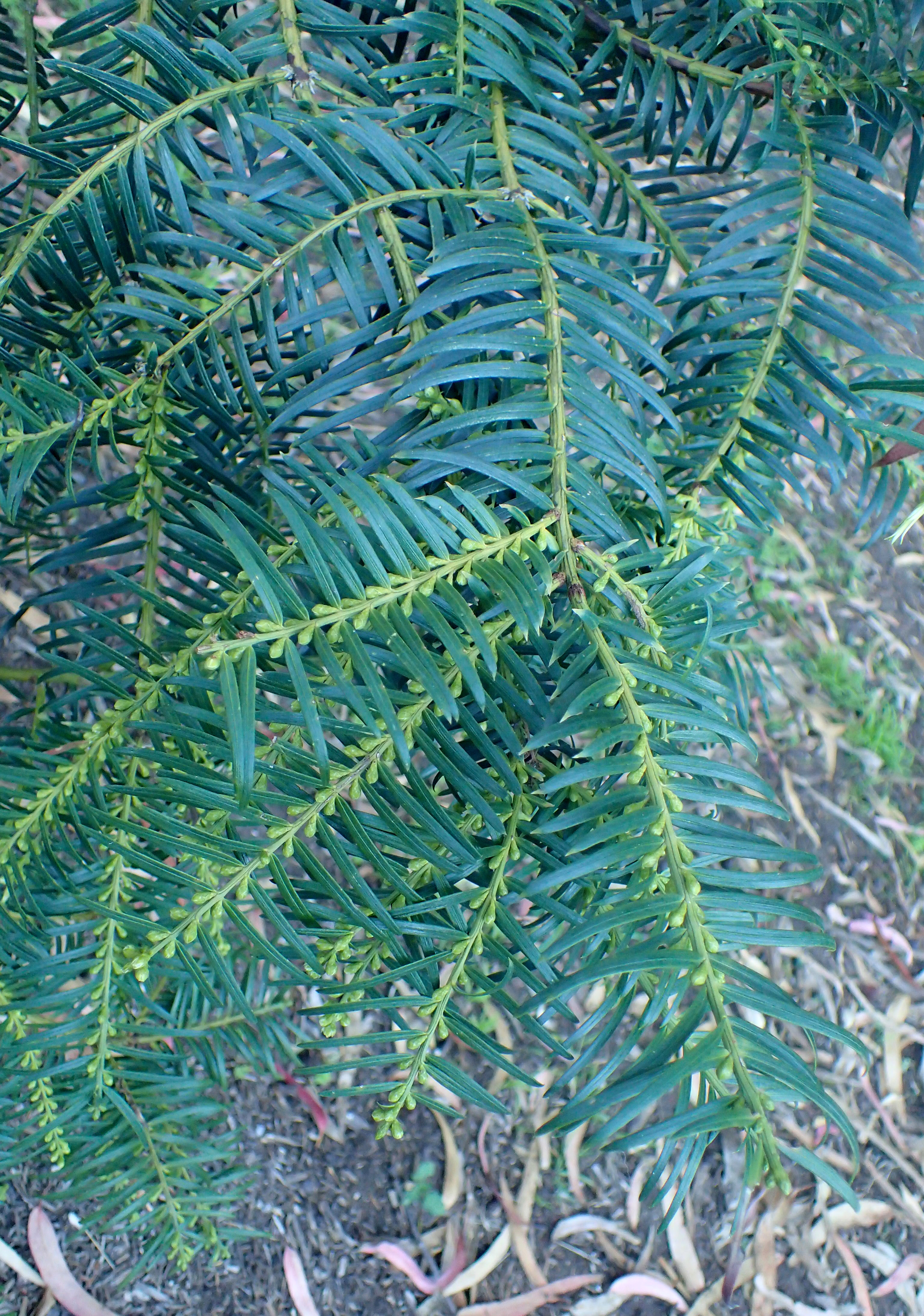
Cephalotaxus wilsoniana

== Distribution and habitat ==
The Taiwan plum yew is endemic to the island of Taiwan, scattered in montane forests at altitudes of 1,400–2,700 m (4,600–8,900 ft). They grow as small trees or bushes in the understories of wet subtropical forests or warm-temperate forests. This variety grows in mixed deciduous and evergreen forests and prefers locations with light to full shade. It is found at elevations of 1,500 to 2,000 meters. However, the distribution is unclear with Kitamura (author of the current name) indicating that it is also found in China, Korea and Japan. Possibly the major reason for this confusion is that a major European taxonomic authority, Plants of the World online, considers it a synonym of C. harringtonia.

== Reproduction and dispersal ==
This variety is distinguished by the reproductive strobili. The seed of the plum yew is approximately the size of an olive or small plum and is larger than those of a true yew. The seed is enclosed by a hard, thin shell and a fleshy outer coat. The outer coat changes colors as the seed ripens from a blue-green to a rich red and finally to a purple-brown. Once it turns purple-brown the fleshy outside degrades causing it to detach from the seed.

This Taiwan plum yew is dioecious with the male and female strobili on different plants. As it is dioecious, and grows scattered amongst broad-leaved trees, the fecundity is not strong. In addition, the seed maturity period is very long. As germination and growth are also slow, Cephalotaxus wilsoniana is not commonly found.

Male strobili are created in clusters of anthers attached to a flat head. The anthers are about 0.25 inches in diameter and are arranged in the axils of the leaves. Female strobili develop in ovules. Often found in pairs of six to twelve, these ovules are attached to an oval, mauve colored cone which will start to expand at 0.5 inches up to 1.25 inches when matured. There is one mature seed per cone, and three to five female cones are grown on stalks near or at the end of the current or last year's branch. Female cones are wind-pollinated.

Seeds have a long maturation time, and the pollen cones usually take nine to eleven months from initiation to dispersal. Female cones take twenty-one months to mature from initiation.

== Cultivation ==
In the U.S., cultivation of the variety Cephaltaxus harringtonia var. wilsoniana is limited to only a few nurseries.

== Conservation ==
The variety is considered endangered due to habitat loss caused by logging, population fragmentation, and ground clearance to make room for plantations of Cryptomeria species. It is concentrated in the northern part of Taiwan where conservation is widespread.

== Uses ==
The wood is used for fire and medicinal purposes. The seeds from female cones are also collected for oil. It is increasingly used in medicine due to the anticancer compounds found in the vegetative tissues and seeds. Experiments have been conducted with ester alkaloids, but no therapeutic applications have been announced.

=== Alkaloids ===
- Wilsonine [39024-12-9]
