= Cephalotaxus latifolia =

Conservation status
- Near Threatened (IUCN 3.1)

Scientific classification
- Kingdom: Plantae
- Clade: Embryophytes
- Clade: Tracheophytes
- Clade: Gymnosperms
- Division: Pinophyta
- Class: Pinopsida
- Order: Cupressales
- Family: Cephalotaxaceae
- Genus: Cephalotaxus
- Species: C. latifolia

Binomial name
- Cephalotaxus latifolia Cheng & Fu

Species of conifer

Cephalotaxus latifolia is a coniferous shrub or small tree in the family Cephalotaxaceae. It is native to southern China and is similar in appearance to both C. sinensis and C. harringtonii.
