= Cephalotaxus alkaloids =

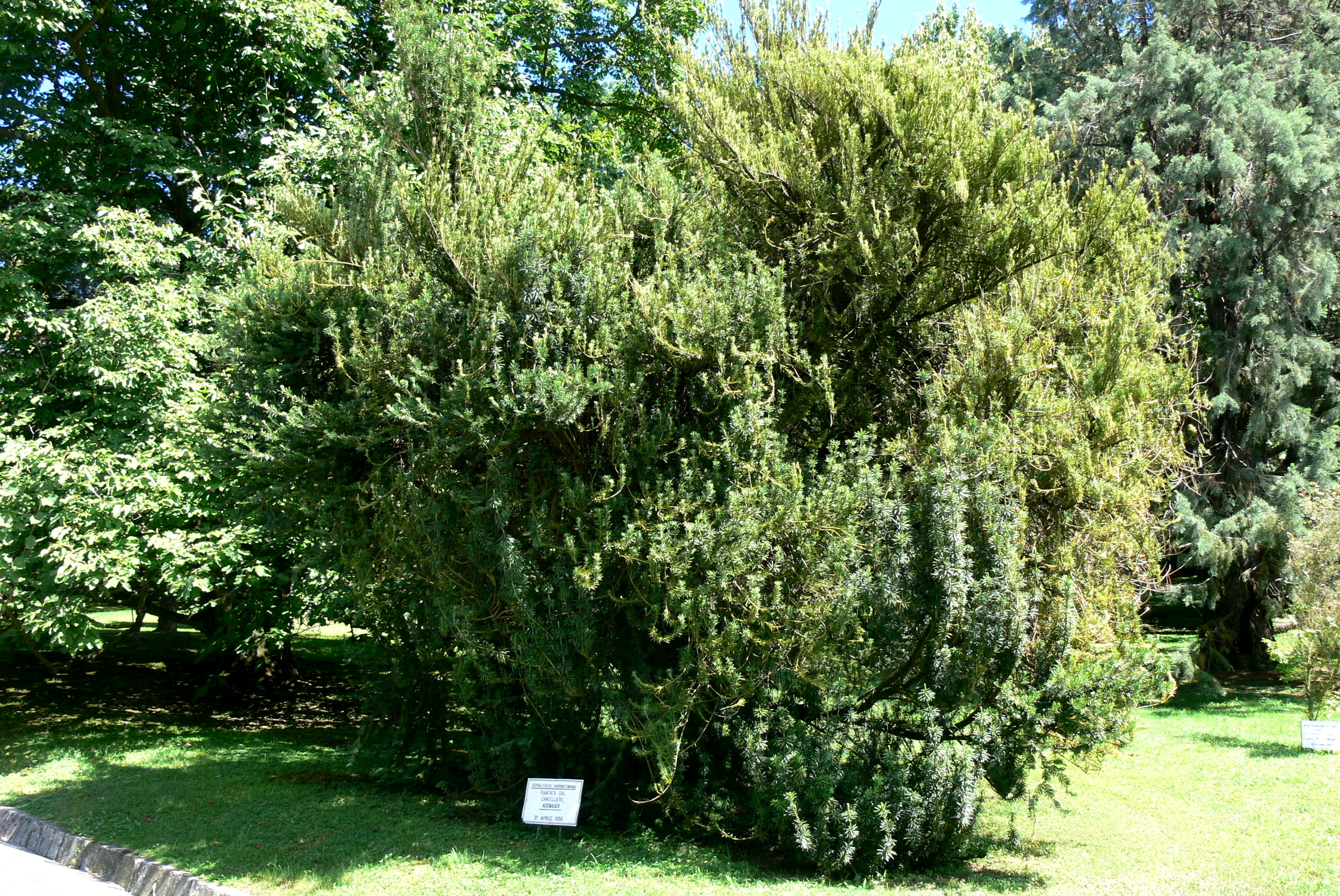
Japanese plum-yew (Cephalotaxus harringtonia)

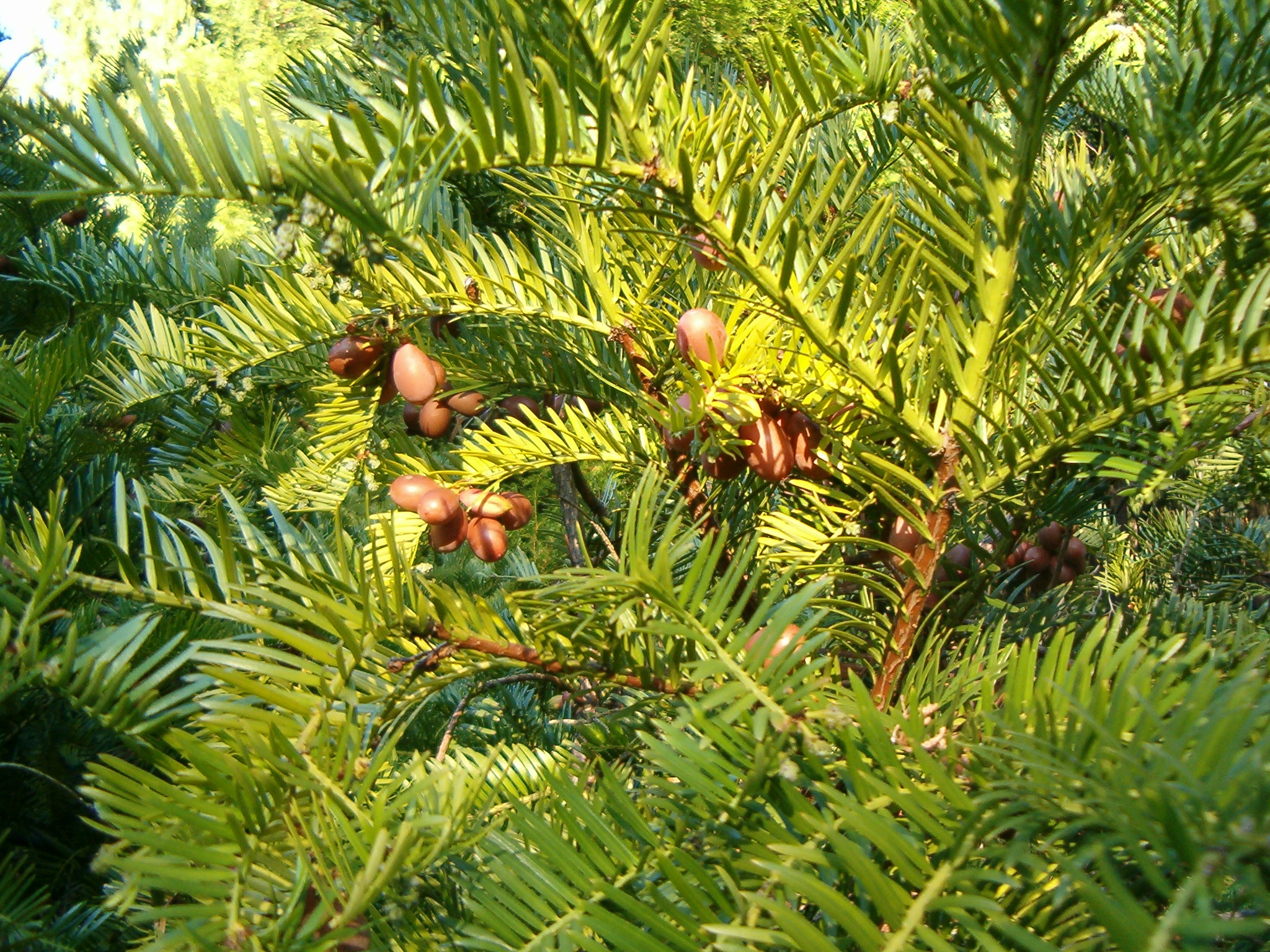
The completely enclosed seeds of the Japanese plum-yew (Cephalotaxus harringtonii) are ripe.

Cephalotaxus alkaloids are natural products characterized by pentacyclic structure.

== Occurrence ==
These alkaloids are commonly found in the plum yew species (Cephalotaxus), especially in the Japanese plum-yew.

== Representative ==
The most important representative is cephalotaxin. Other notable representatives include harringtonine and homoharringtonine.

(-)-Cephalotaxin
(omacetaxine)

(-)-Harringtonine

(-)-Isoharringtonine

(-)-Homoharringtonine
(omacetaxine mepesuccinate)

== Properties ==
Harringtonine and homoharringtonine exhibit antitumor activity and act against murine leukemia cells. They serve as protein and DNA biosynthesis inhibitors and are used against acute myelocytoxic leukemia.
