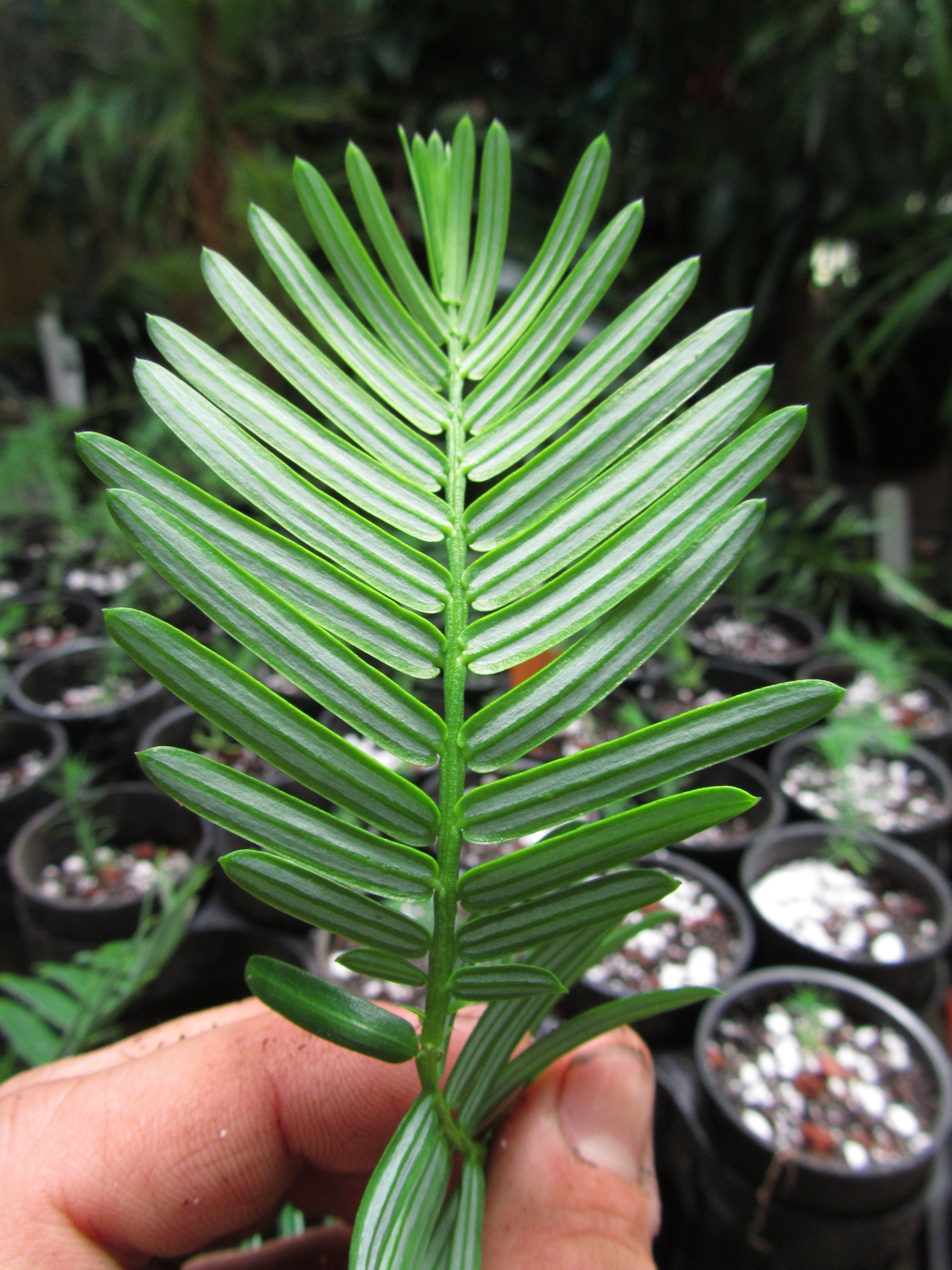

Conservation status
- Vulnerable (IUCN 3.1)

Scientific classification
- Kingdom: Plantae
- Clade: Embryophytes
- Clade: Tracheophytes
- Clade: Gymnosperms
- Division: Pinophyta
- Class: Pinopsida
- Order: Cupressales
- Family: Cephalotaxaceae
- Genus: Cephalotaxus
- Species: C. mannii

Binomial name
- Cephalotaxus mannii Hook.f.

= Cephalotaxus mannii =

Species of conifer

Cephalotaxus mannii is a species of conifer in the family Cephalotaxaceae. It is a tree up to about 20 metres (66 ft) tall, native to southern China, northeast India, Laos, northern Thailand, northern Myanmar and northern Vietnam. While the species is widespread, its populations are fragmented and it is threatened by cutting for timber as well as for using its bark and leaves for medicinal extracts.

Sometimes (e.g.) the species Cephalotaxus griffithii and Cephalotaxus hainanensis are considered synonyms of this species.
