= Cephalotaxus lanceolata =

Conservation status
- Endangered (IUCN 3.1)

Scientific classification
- Kingdom: Plantae
- Clade: Embryophytes
- Clade: Tracheophytes
- Clade: Gymnosperms
- Division: Pinophyta
- Class: Pinopsida
- Order: Cupressales
- Family: Cephalotaxaceae
- Genus: Cephalotaxus
- Species: C. lanceolata

Binomial name
- Cephalotaxus lanceolata Feng

Species of conifer

Cephalotaxus lanceolata is a coniferous tree in the family Cephalotaxaceae. It is native to northern Burma and southern China. It is often considered a variety of C. fortunei.
