= Cephalotaxus hainanensis =

Conservation status
- Endangered (IUCN 3.1)

Scientific classification
- Kingdom: Plantae
- Clade: Tracheophytes
- Clade: Gymnosperms
- Division: Pinophyta
- Class: Pinopsida
- Order: Cupressales
- Family: Cephalotaxaceae
- Genus: Cephalotaxus
- Species: C. hainanensis

Binomial name
- Cephalotaxus hainanensis H.L.Li

Synonyms
- Cephalotaxus harringtonia var. thailandensis Silba; Cephalotaxus mannii subsp. thailandensis (Silba) Silba; Cephalotaxus sinensis subsp. hainanensis (H.L.Li) Silba

Species of conifer

Cephalotaxus hainanensis is a species of conifer in the family Cephalotaxaceae, known by the common name Hainan plum-yew. It is native to southern China (Hainan, Guangdong, Guangxi, and Yunnan), southeastern Tibet, and Myanmar, Thailand, and Vietnam in northern Indochina.

== Description ==
When mature it is a tree 10–20 m (33–66 ft) tall. It has sickle-shaped or straight leaves, 2.0–4.5 cm (0.79–1.77 in) long and 3.5–4.5 mm (0.14–0.18 in) wide, with a truncate, circular truncate or nearly cordate base and an acute or slightly acute apex with edges rolling downwards when dry. Male cones are approximately 4–7 mm (0.16–0.28 in) long, and seeds are 2.2–2.8 cm (0.87–1.10 in) long and obovate-elliptic or obovoid.

== Range and habitat ==
This species grows in warmer temperate and subtropical montane rainforests. It inhabits mixed forests and forested ravines from 800–1,200 m (2,600–3,900 ft) elevation. It is sometimes a dominant species in the local ecosystem.

== Taxonomy ==
The species was first described by Hui-lin Li in 1954. It was formerly considered endemic to the island of Hainan, and some considered it a synonym of Cephalotaxus mannii. A 2013 revision of the genus Cephalotaxus affirmed its status as a distinct species, and identified C. harringtonia var. thailandensis as a synonym.

== Conservation ==
The IUCN Red List assessed the species as Endangered, based on distribution only in Hainan. The species is now considered to have a wider distribution in mainland China and northern Indochina.

== Uses ==
C. hainanensis is suggested to have antileukemia activity, and is widely used as an herbal remedy in China. Exploitation of the bark and leaves is a potential threat to this species. Logging has historically been a cause of its decline, but as logging is no longer allowed on Hainan, much of the pressure is currently from illegal harvesting for Chinese remedies.
