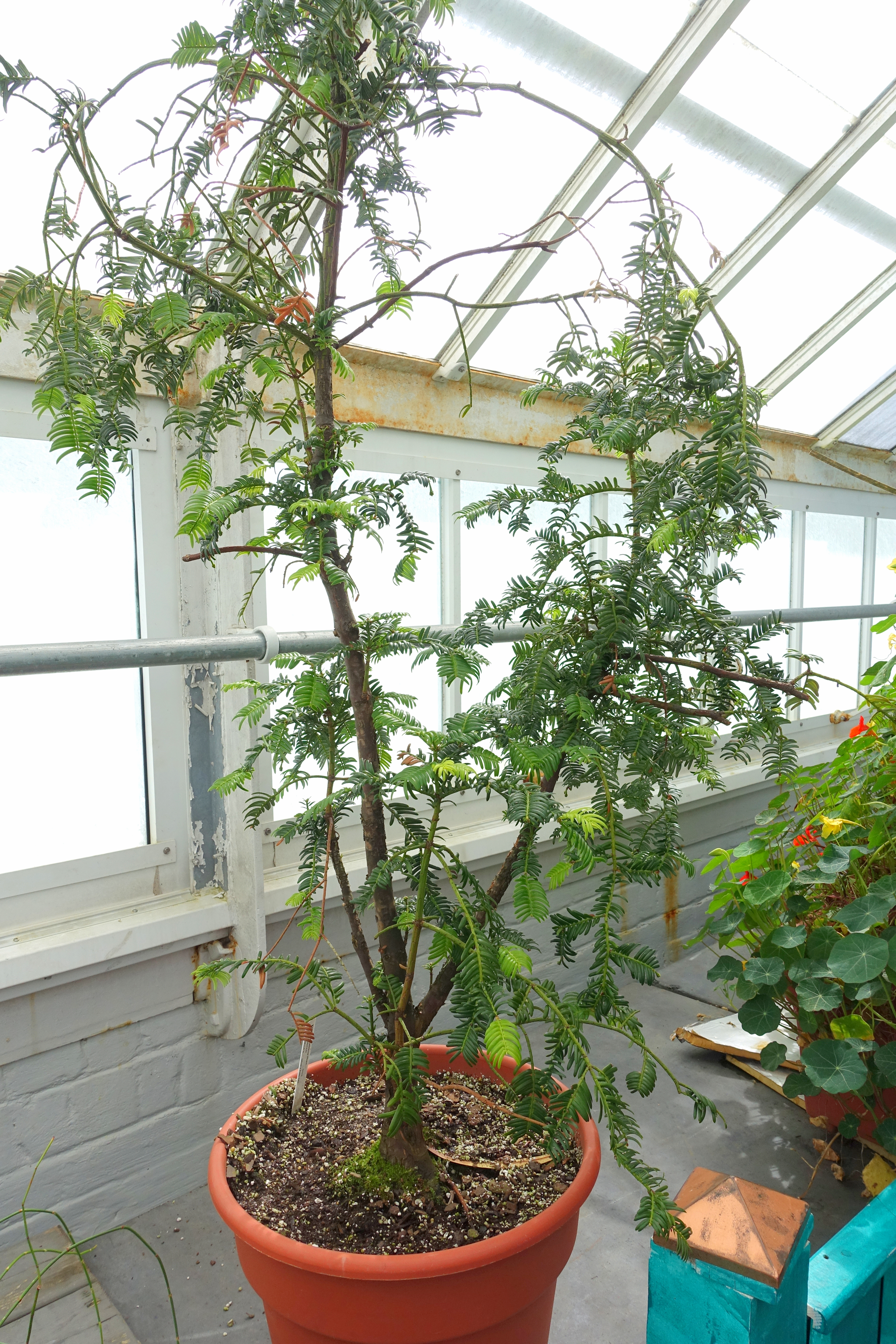

Conservation status
- Vulnerable (IUCN 3.1)

Scientific classification
- Kingdom: Plantae
- Clade: Embryophytes
- Clade: Tracheophytes
- Clade: Gymnosperms
- Division: Pinophyta
- Class: Pinopsida
- Order: Cupressales
- Family: Cephalotaxaceae
- Genus: Cephalotaxus
- Species: C. oliveri

Binomial name
- Cephalotaxus oliveri Mast.

Synonyms
- Cephalotaxus griffithii Oliv.

= Cephalotaxus oliveri =

Species of conifer

Cephalotaxus oliveri, the Oliver's plum yew, is a coniferous shrub or small tree in the family Cephalotaxaceae. It is native to China and possibly to Thailand, Laos, Vietnam and eastern India.

== Description ==
Shrubs or small trees up to 4 m tall. The bark is yellow to grayish brown and scaly. The leafy branchlets are oblong-elliptic in outline. Leaves are borne at 55-70° to branchlet axis. The pollen-cone is borne on the lower side and toward the distal end of terminal branchlets. The buds develop before the subtending leaves expand. Seeds cones are solitary. Seeds are obovoid, ovoid, or almost globose. Pollination occurs Mar-Apr while seeds mature from Aug-Oct.

== Habitat and ecology ==
Cephalotaxus oliveri occurs in subtropical evergreen and deciduous broad-leaved forests, coniferous and mixed forests, at altitudes between 300 and 1,800 meters above sea level. It is an understorey shrub, occurring in the shrub layer mixed with several genera of angiosperms such as Rhododendron, Camellia, Cotoneaster, Deutzia, Lonicera, Berberis, Buddleia, Euonymus, Hydrangea, Prunus and other species.

== Uses ==
This species is exploited for its bark, twigs, roots and seeds, which contain anti-carcinogenic alkaloids, for medicinal purpose. It is also cultivated as an ornamental shrub both in and outside China.

== Status ==
This species has a wide range and a large population, but it has experienced population reduction of more than 30% over the last 90–100 years due to exploitation of the plant for medicinal purposes and the loss of habitat due to deforestation by logging and agricultural expansion. The reduction is likely to continue, so this species is listed as Vulnerable based on the past declines.
