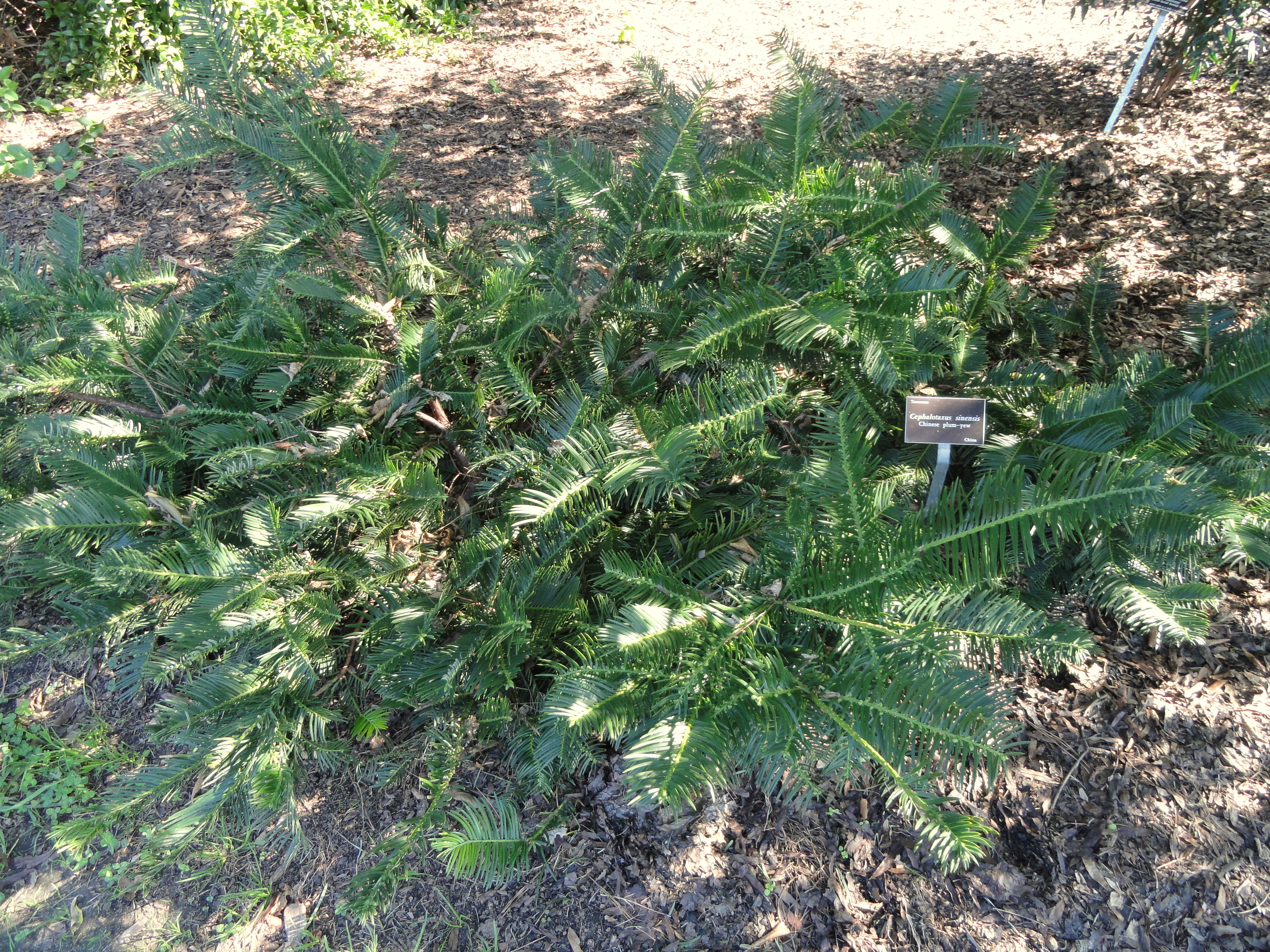

Conservation status
- Least Concern (IUCN 3.1)

Scientific classification
- Kingdom: Plantae
- Clade: Embryophytes
- Clade: Tracheophytes
- Clade: Gymnosperms
- Division: Pinophyta
- Class: Pinopsida
- Order: Cupressales
- Family: Cephalotaxaceae
- Genus: Cephalotaxus
- Species: C. sinensis

Binomial name
- Cephalotaxus sinensis (Rehder & E.H.Wilson) H.L. Li

= Cephalotaxus sinensis =

Species of conifer

Cephalotaxus sinensis is a species of coniferous shrub or small tree in the family Cephalotaxaceae. It is native to central and southern China.

Some botanists consider Cephalotaxus koreana and C. sinensis to be synonymous with Cephalotaxus harringtonii.
