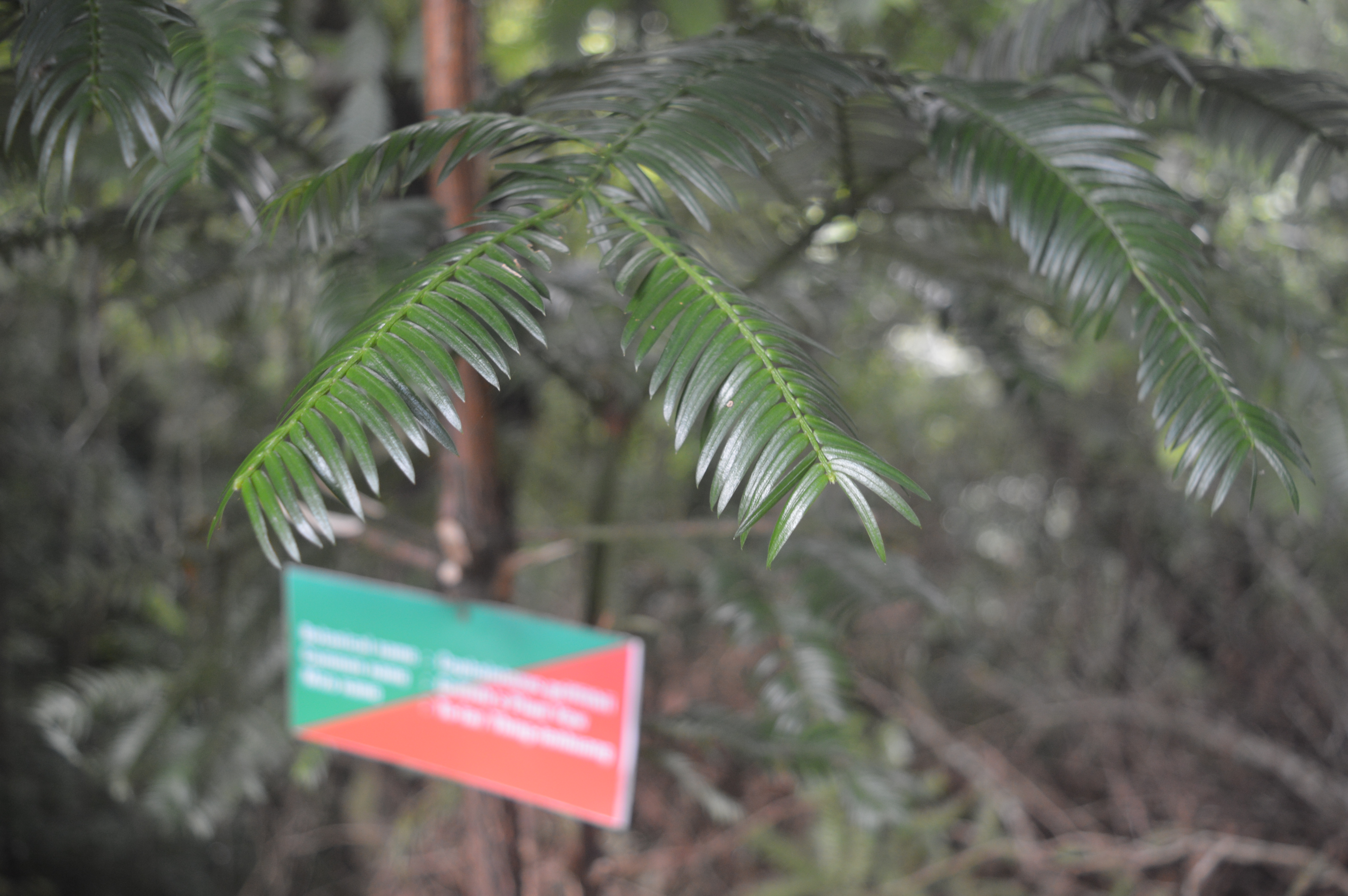
- Leaves

Scientific classification
- Kingdom: Plantae
- Clade: Embryophytes
- Clade: Tracheophytes
- Clade: Gymnosperms
- Division: Pinophyta
- Class: Pinopsida
- Order: Cupressales
- Family: Cephalotaxaceae
- Genus: Cephalotaxus
- Species: C. griffithii

Binomial name
- Cephalotaxus griffithii Hook.f.

Synonyms
- Cephalotaxus lanceolata K.M.Feng ex W.C.Cheng, L.K.Fu & C.Y.Cheng

= Cephalotaxus griffithii =

Griffith's plum yew

Species of conifer

Cephalotaxus griffithii, commonly called Griffith's plum yew, is a coniferous shrub or small tree in the family Cephalotaxaceae, growing to 20 m (66 ft). It is native to northeastern India (Arunachal Pradesh, Manipur, Nagaland), northern Myanmar and western Sichuan in China. The species is named after the British botanist William Griffith.
