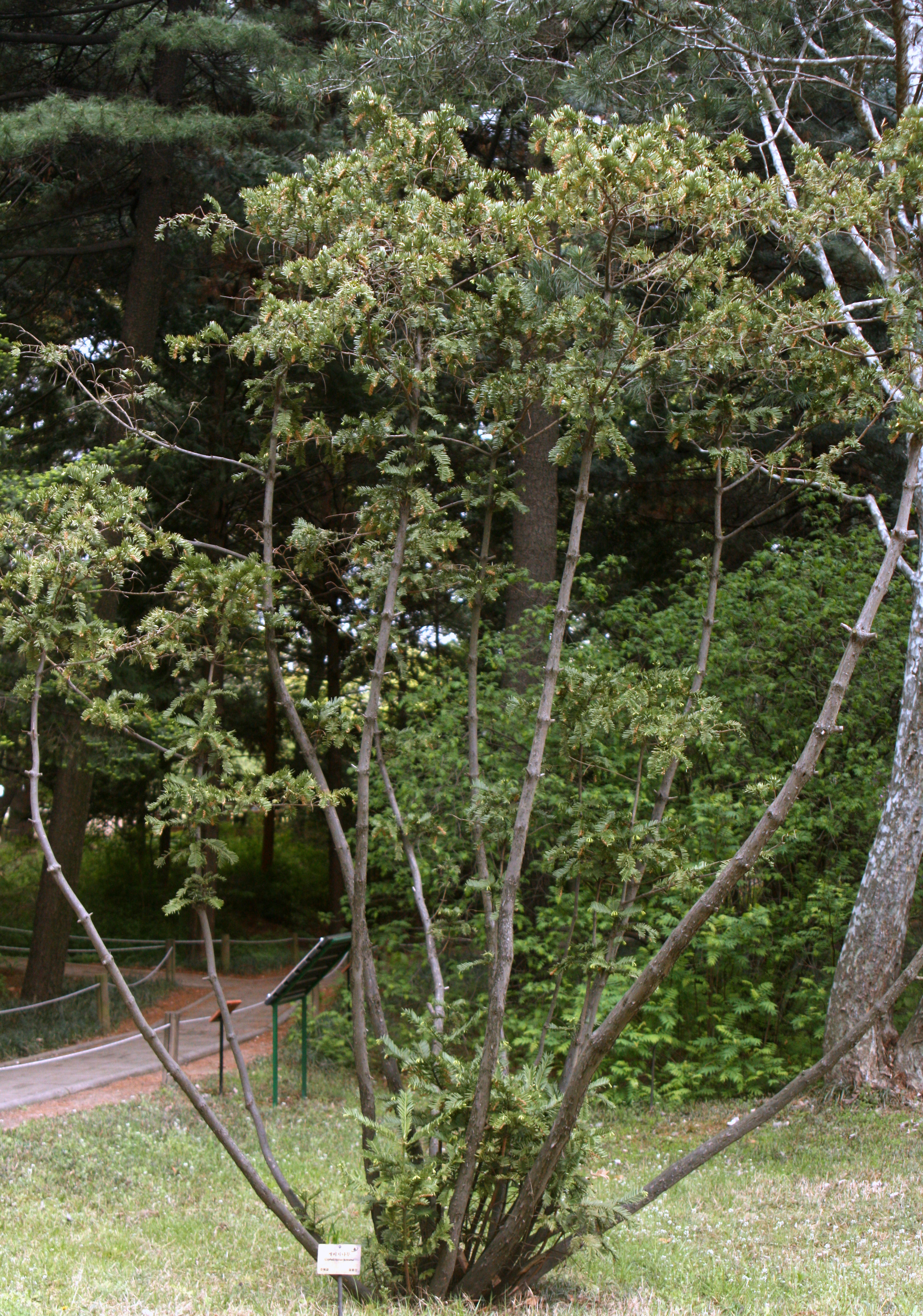

Scientific classification
- Kingdom: Plantae
- Clade: Embryophytes
- Clade: Tracheophytes
- Clade: Gymnosperms
- Division: Pinophyta
- Class: Pinopsida
- Order: Cupressales
- Family: Cephalotaxaceae
- Genus: Cephalotaxus
- Species: C. koreana

Binomial name
- Cephalotaxus koreana Nakai

= Cephalotaxus koreana =

Korean plum yew

Species of conifer

Cephalotaxus koreana, commonly called the Korean plum yew, is a species of coniferous shrub or small tree in the family Cephalotaxaceae. It is native to Korea, Japan and northeast China. Some botanists consider it synonymous with C. harringtonii.

Cephalotaxus koreana contains catechin-7-O-glucoside.
