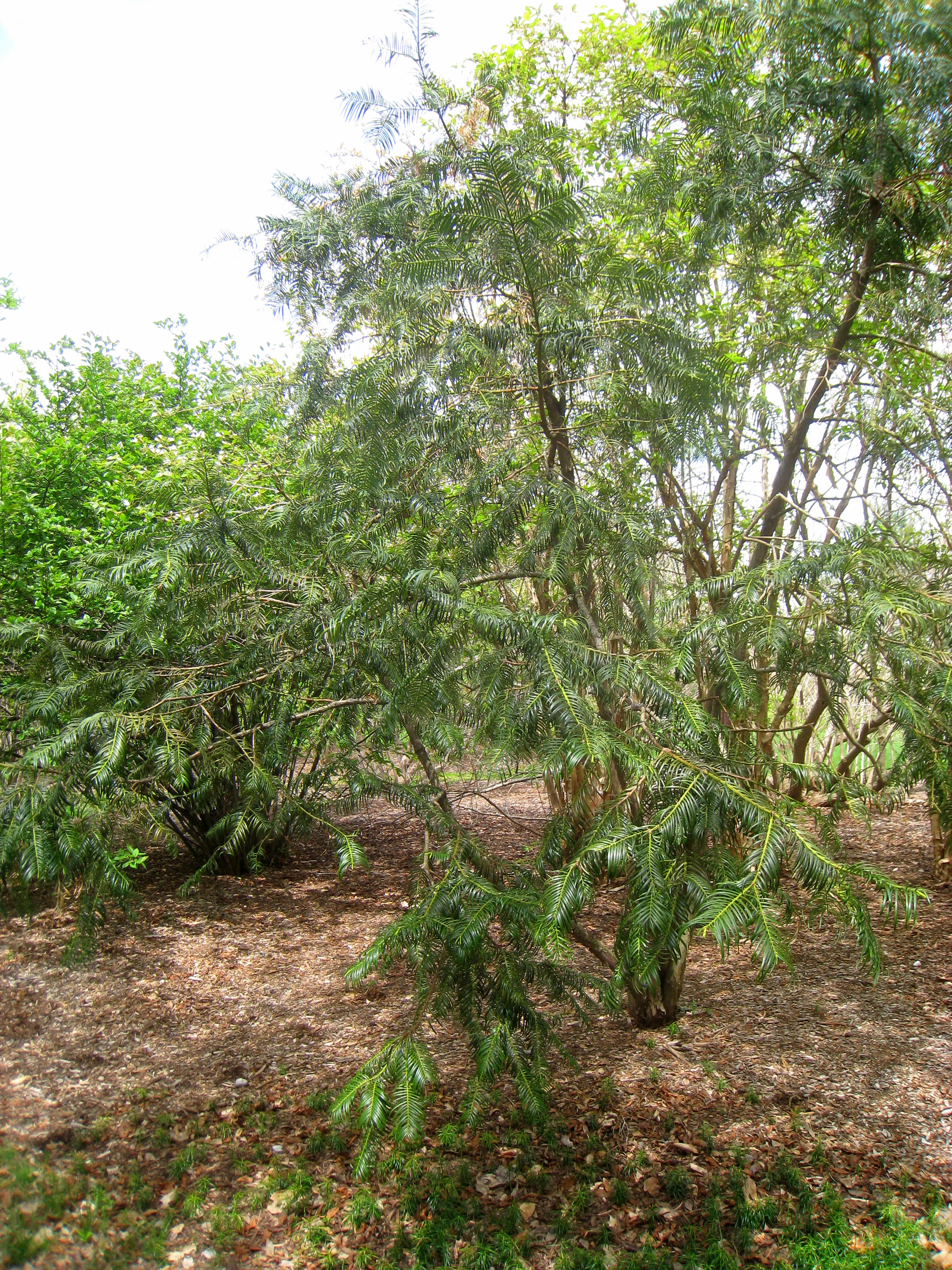

Conservation status
- Least Concern (IUCN 3.1)

Scientific classification
- Kingdom: Plantae
- Clade: Embryophytes
- Clade: Tracheophytes
- Clade: Gymnosperms
- Division: Pinophyta
- Class: Pinopsida
- Order: Cupressales
- Family: Cephalotaxaceae
- Genus: Cephalotaxus
- Species: C. fortunei

Binomial name
- Cephalotaxus fortunei Hook.

= Cephalotaxus fortunei =

Chinese plum-yew

Species of conifer

Cephalotaxus fortunei, commonly called the Chinese plum-yew, Fortune's yew plum, simply plum yew, Chinese cowtail pine or in Chinese as san jian shan (Chinese: 三尖杉; pinyin: sǎnjiānshān), is a coniferous shrub or small tree in the family Cephalotaxaceae. It is native to northern Burma and China, but is sometimes grown in western gardens where it has been in cultivation since 1848.

== Description ==
Cephalotaxus fortunei is a shrub or small tree growing to as high as 20 m with a diameter at breast height of about 20 cm. They are usually multi-stemmed with an open and loosely rounded crown. In cultivation they tend to grow on a single stem that is often leaning and bare towards the bottom, but with dense foliage on the upper half. They have reddish brown bark that appears purplish in places with rough square scales and long shreds peeling off. The new shoots remain green for three years after emerging and are ribbed. The branches are slightly pendulous, while the branchlets are obovate, obtriangular or almost rectangular in outline, measuring from 4 to 21 cm long by 3 to 20 cm wide.

The buds are about 4 mm in length, globular in shape and dark green in colour. They are covered with acute, glossy reddish brown scale-like leaves which remain on the base of the shoot into the following year. The leaves themselves are glossy on the adaxial surface, i.e. the upper-side, and a deep yellowish-green to dark green in colour. They are borne almost horizontally from the branchlet. They are the longest leaves in the genus, typically measuring 3.5 to 12.5 cm, though they can be as short as 1.5 cm, by 3.2 to 5 mm wide, though they sometimes are as narrow as 1.5 mm. They are linear-lanceolate in shape, distally gradually attenuate, i.e. tapering to a point at the end. Their outline is falcate, or sickle-like, to more or less straight and flat. The texture is somewhat leathery, but generally they are quite soft and flexible. The midvein is 0.2 to 0.5 mm wide on the abaxial surface, or underside, showing two broad and grey stomatal bands that are 0.8 to 2.1 mm wide with 13 to 24 rows of stomata, though the individual stomata are not readily visible to the naked eye. The leaf base is cuneate, or wedge-shaped, to shortly attenuate, while the apex is cuspidate, or fine pointed. The cusp, or terminal point on the leaves, measures 0.5 to 2 mm, though it often breaks off. The petiole is short at 0.5 to 2 mm in length.

The pollen cone is actually a capitula, or a conglomerate, of 6 to 14 cones, and is whitish in colour. They can either be distinctly pedunculate, or stalked, with the peduncle measuring 2 to 5 mm, or sessile, i.e. unstalked, to subsessile, i.e. partially stalked, with the peduncle measuring 0 to 2 mm. They are globose in shape and are 6 to 10 mm in diameter. The bracts are ovate in shape with the largest of them being roughly 2 mm long by 2.5 mm wide with a more or less entire margin, though the margin is sometimes erose, or jagged, and their apex is acute. There are between 6 and 16 microsporophylls present with each containing with 3 or 4 pollen sacs. The seed cones are borne together in groups of 3 to 6. They are pedunculate with the peduncle being 3 to 12 mm in length. The seed scales measure approximately 1.5 mm. The aril of the fruit is initially yellow or green, though it turns to purple when ripe. The fruits measure 1.4 to 2.5 cm long by 0.9 to 1.5 cm wide and have several indistinct striations or prominent longitudinal ridges. The apex of the fruit is very shortly mucronate, i.e. terminating in a sharp tip. The seeds are ellipsoid in shape and are 1.3 to cm 2.4 long by 0.7 to 1.4 cm wide. There are 11 haploid chromosomes present with the tree's DNA.

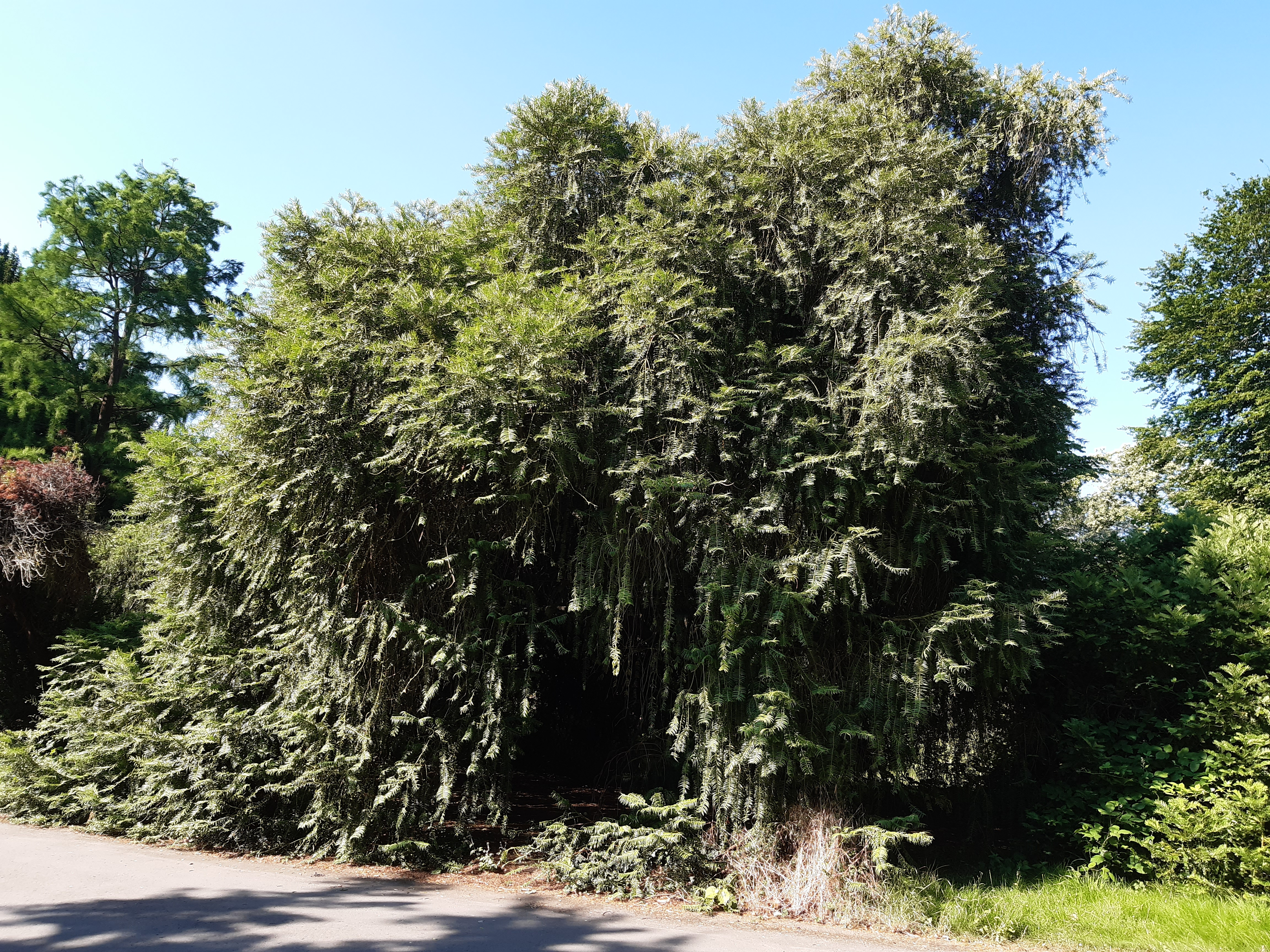
tree in Kew Gardens

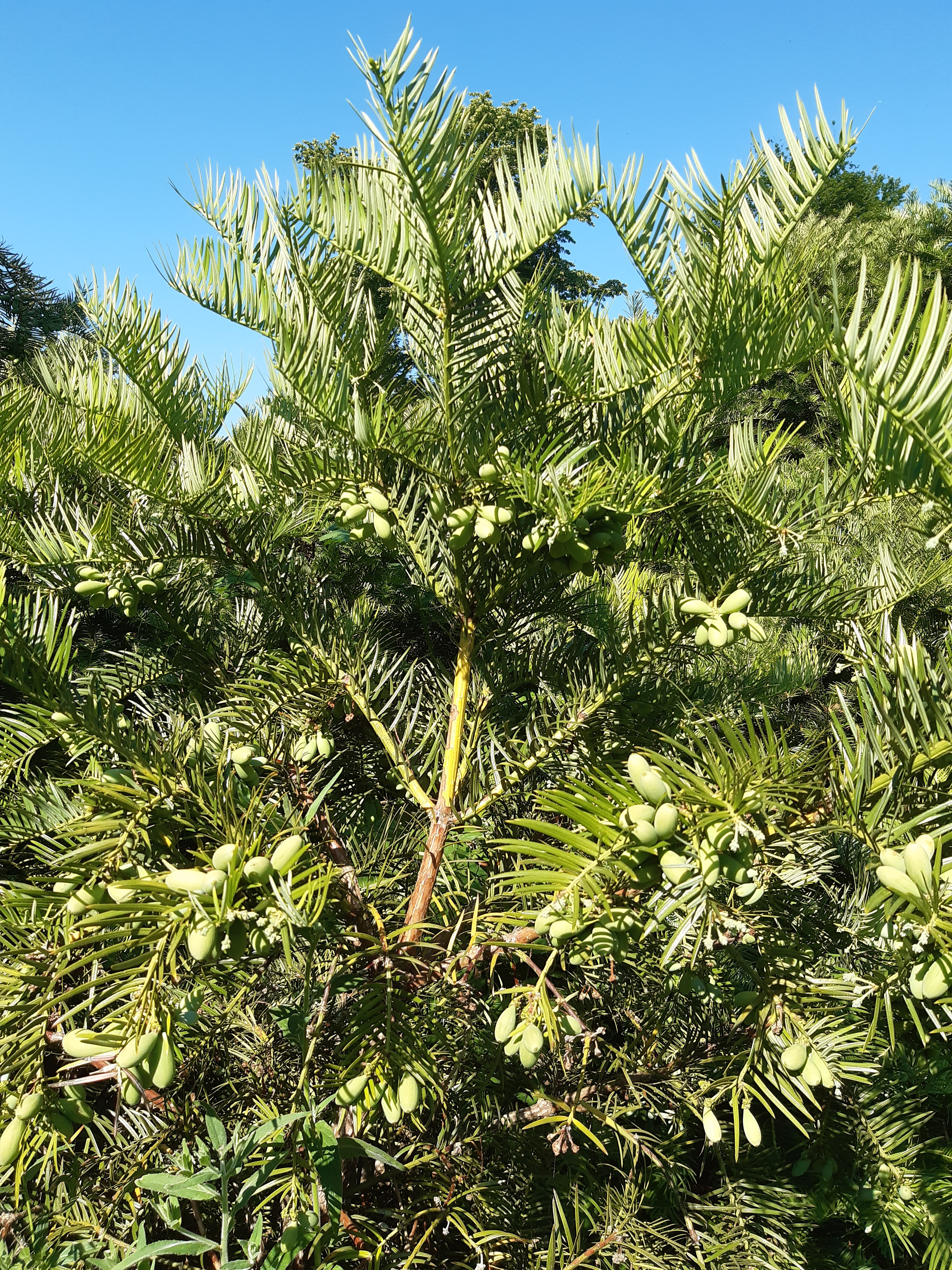
Branch with fruit

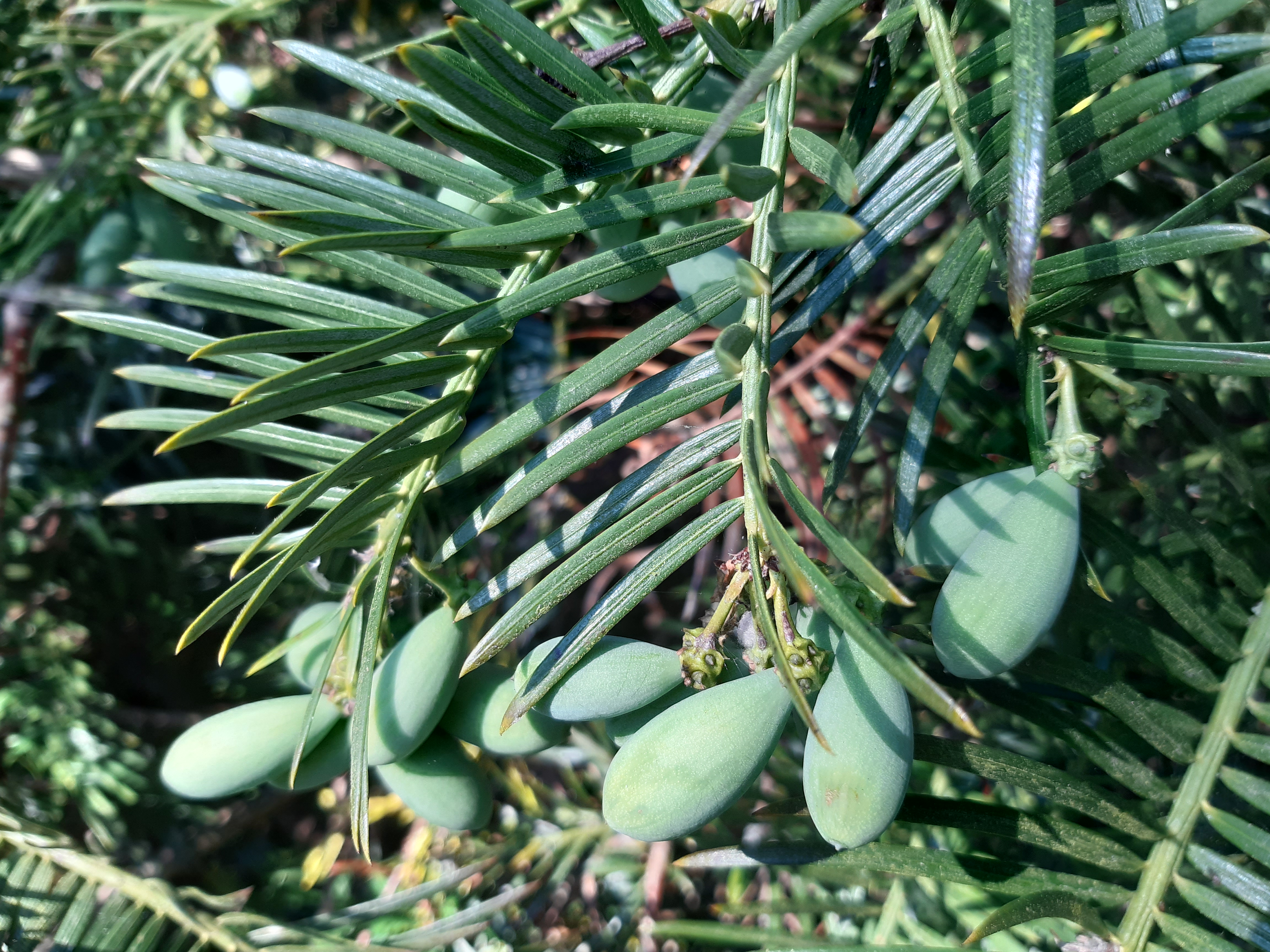
Foliage and fruit

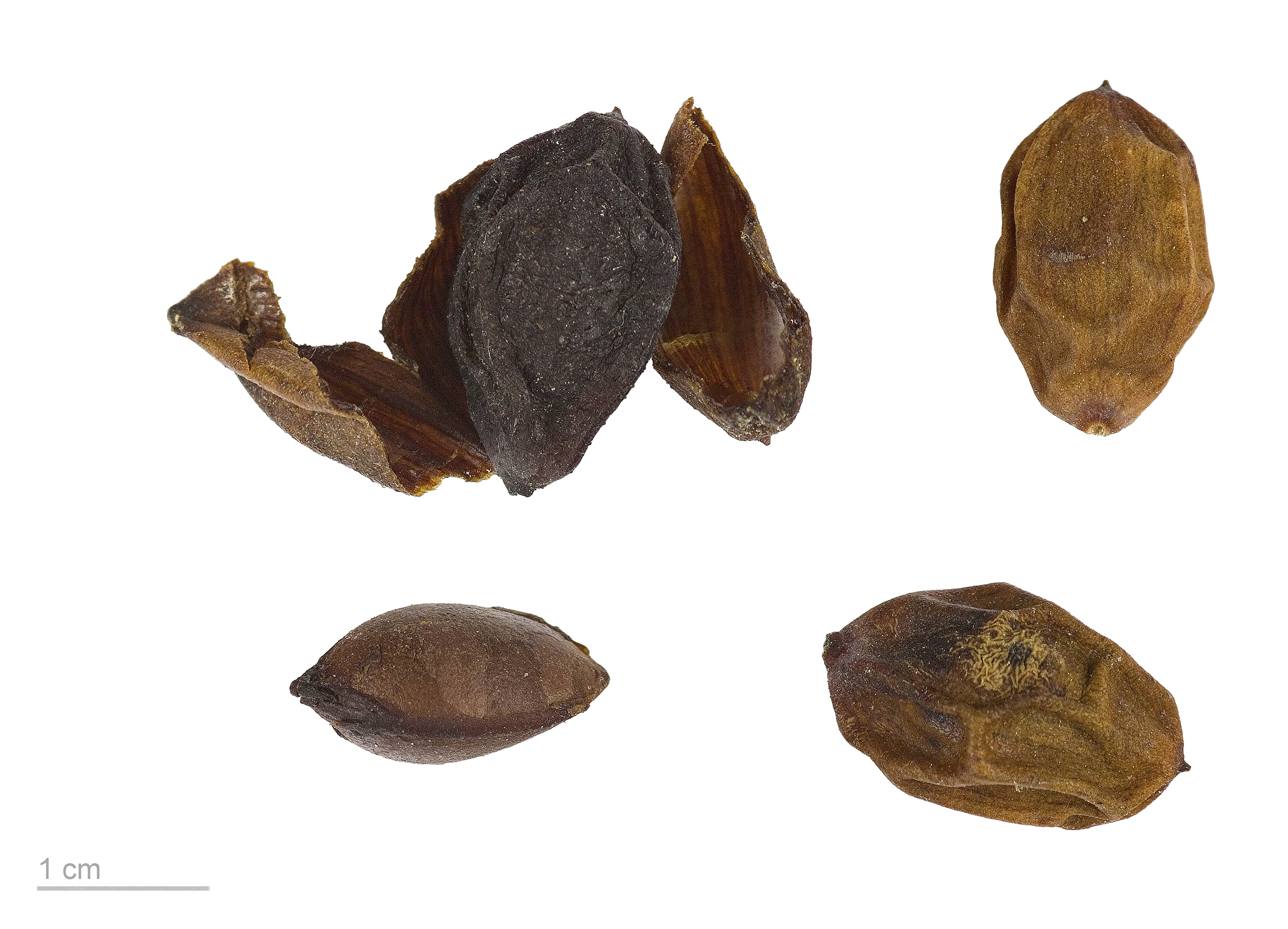
Fruit and seed
(herbarium specimen)
