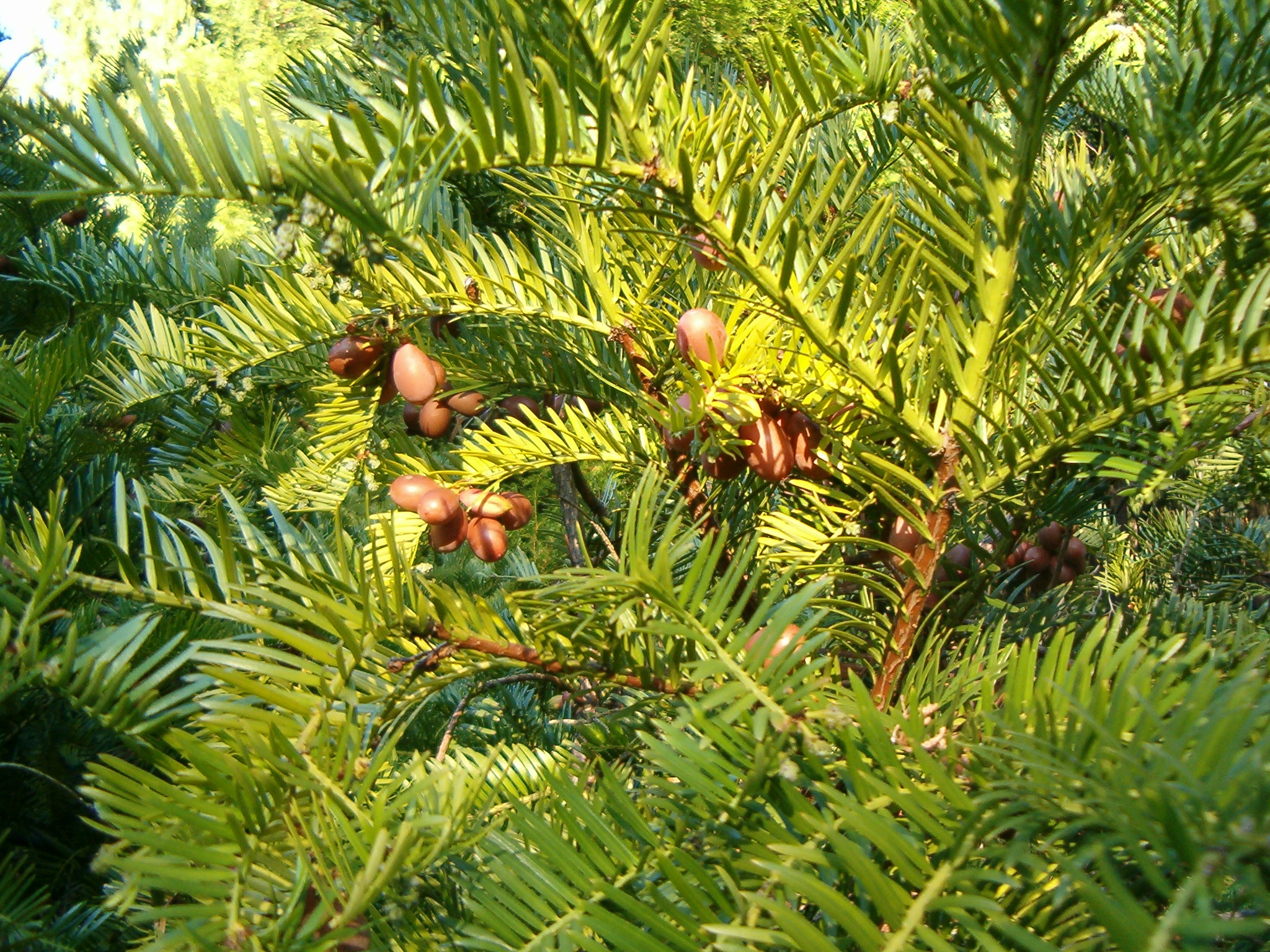
- Close-up of a specimen in the Botanical Garden in Berlin

Conservation status
- Least Concern (IUCN 3.1)

Scientific classification
- Kingdom: Plantae
- Clade: Embryophytes
- Clade: Tracheophytes
- Clade: Gymnosperms
- Division: Pinophyta
- Class: Pinopsida
- Order: Cupressales
- Family: Cephalotaxaceae
- Genus: Cephalotaxus
- Species: C. harringtonii

Binomial name
- Cephalotaxus harringtonii (Knight ex J.Forbes) K. Koch

Synonyms
- List: Cephalotaxus drupacea var. harringtonia (Knight ex J.Forbes) Pilg.; Taxus harringtonia Knight ex J.Forbes; Cephalotaxus buergeri Miq.; Cephalotaxus drupacea Siebold & Zucc.; Cephalotaxus drupacea f. fastigiata (Carrière) Pilg.; Cephalotaxus drupacea var. pedunculata (Siebold & Zucc.) Miq.; Cephalotaxus drupacea var. sinensis Rehder & E.H.Wilson; Cephalotaxus drupacea f. sphaeralis (Mast.) Pilg.; Cephalotaxus fortunei var. foemina Carrière; Cephalotaxus harringtonia f. drupacea (Siebold & Zucc.) Kitam.; Cephalotaxus harringtonia subsp. drupacea (Siebold & Zucc.) Silba; Cephalotaxus harringtonia var. drupacea (Siebold & Zucc.) Koidz.; Cephalotaxus harringtonia var. fastigiata (Carrière) C.K.Schneid.; Cephalotaxus harringtonia f. fastigiata (Carrière) Rehder; Cephalotaxus harringtonia lusus koraiana (Siebold ex Endl.) K.Koch ex Asch. & Graebn.; Cephalotaxus harringtonia var. koraiana (Siebold ex Endl.) Koidz.; Cephalotaxus harringtonia var. sinensis (Rehder & E.H.Wilson) Rehder; Cephalotaxus harringtonia var. sphaeralis (Mast.) C.K.Schneid.; Cephalotaxus harringtonia f. sphaeralis (Mast.) Rehder; Cephalotaxus harringtonia var. wilsoniana (Hayata) Kitam.; Cephalotaxus pedunculata Siebold & Zucc.; Cephalotaxus pedunculata var. fastigiata Carrière; Cephalotaxus pedunculata var. sphaeralis Mast.; Cephalotaxus sinensis (Rehder & E.H.Wilson) H.L.Li; Cephalotaxus sinensis var. wilsoniana (Hayata) L.K.Fu & N.Li; Cephalotaxus sinensis subsp. wilsoniana (Hayata) Silba; Cephalotaxus wilsoniana Hayata; Nageia koraiana (Siebold ex Endl.) Kuntze; Podocarpus koraianus Siebold ex Endl.; Taxus baccata Thunb.; Taxus coriacea Knight; Taxus drupacea (Siebold & Zucc.) C.Lawson; Taxus inukaja Knight; Taxus japonica Lodd. ex Gordon & Glend.; Taxus pedunculata (Siebold & Zucc.) C.Lawson

= Cephalotaxus harringtonii =

Species of conifer

Cephalotaxus harringtonii, commonly known as Korean plum yew, Japanese plum-yew, Harrington's cephalotaxus, or cowtail pine, is a species of coniferous shrub or small tree in the family Cephalotaxaceae. It is native to East Asia, but is occasionally utilised in western gardens and several cultivars exist for these purposes. Japanese plum yew (Korean plum yew) has been in cultivation in Europe since 1829, and many modern horticulturists are familiar with this species, named in honour of Charles Stanhope, 4th Earl of Harrington, one of the first to grow the plant in a European garden, at Elvaston.

== Description ==
New shoots of C. harringtonii remain green for three years after forming and have ribs at the leaf bases. The buds are green in colour, globular in shape and very small at only 1 mm in length. There is one rank of leaves present on either side of the shoot, and these rise up above it and curve slightly inwards, forming a narrow V-shape somewhat akin to a dove's wings. The ranks are often vertical, but can be more flattened in shaded parts. The leaves are broadly linear in shape and measure about 5 cm long by 0.3 cm wide. They are abruptly pointed at the apex, leathery in texture and a bright matte yellowish-green on the upper-surface. The abaxial surface, or underside of the leaves, shows two broad, pale to silvery stomatal bands.

The species is dioecious and the male plants are typically densely covered with pairs of cones that are pale cream in colour, though they become brown with time, and globular in shape. They are borne on 2 to 4 mm stalks beneath each pair of leaves. Pollen is released from March until May. The female individuals have two pairs of knob-like globose cones that appear on curved stalks at the bases of the shoots. The mature cone is obovoid in shape and measures 2.5 cm long by 1.5 cm wide. They are a smooth and pale green in colour with dark green stipes, though when ripe they turn brown.

In South Korea, cones on both male and female trees appear from March to May.

== Taxonomy ==
Cephalotaxus harringtonia was first considered to be a yew when it was partially described by Thomas Andrew Knight in 1839 and as such he named it Taxus harringtonia. The specimen described had been cultivated from a collection from the Penang mountain range. In 1873, Karl Koch transferred it to the genus, Cephalotaxus, giving it the name, Cephalotaxus harringtonia.

In 1846, Philipp Franz von Siebold and Joseph Gerhard Zuccarini described the new species, Cephalotaxus drupacea (an invalid name). However like C. koreana and C. sinensis, this, too, is considered synonymous with C. harringtonii.

The name Cephalotaxus harringtonia violates the grammatical rules of Botanical Latin and in 2012 was corrected to Cephalotaxus harringtonii. However, this opinion is not universally accepted by taxonomists and therefore it is acceptable to use Cephalotaxus harringtonia until a definitive position has been agreed.

== Range and habitat ==
This species is native to China, the Korean peninsula, Japan and Taiwan.

In South Korea it is found in Gyeonggi-do and in the south, in mountainous forests.

In Japan, Cephalotaxus harringtonii is found from Kyūshū in the south to Hokkaidō in the north. More specifically, it is found in Hondo in the Chiba Prefecture on Mount Kiyosumi, which is located in the Awa District within the Awa Province. It is also found in the Nagasaki Prefecture and the Hiroshima Prefecture. The variety nana is found in eastern Honshū as well as Hokkaidō, most notably on seaside cliffs and in mountainous areas. They thrive in partial shade on deep, rich soils.

== Gallery ==
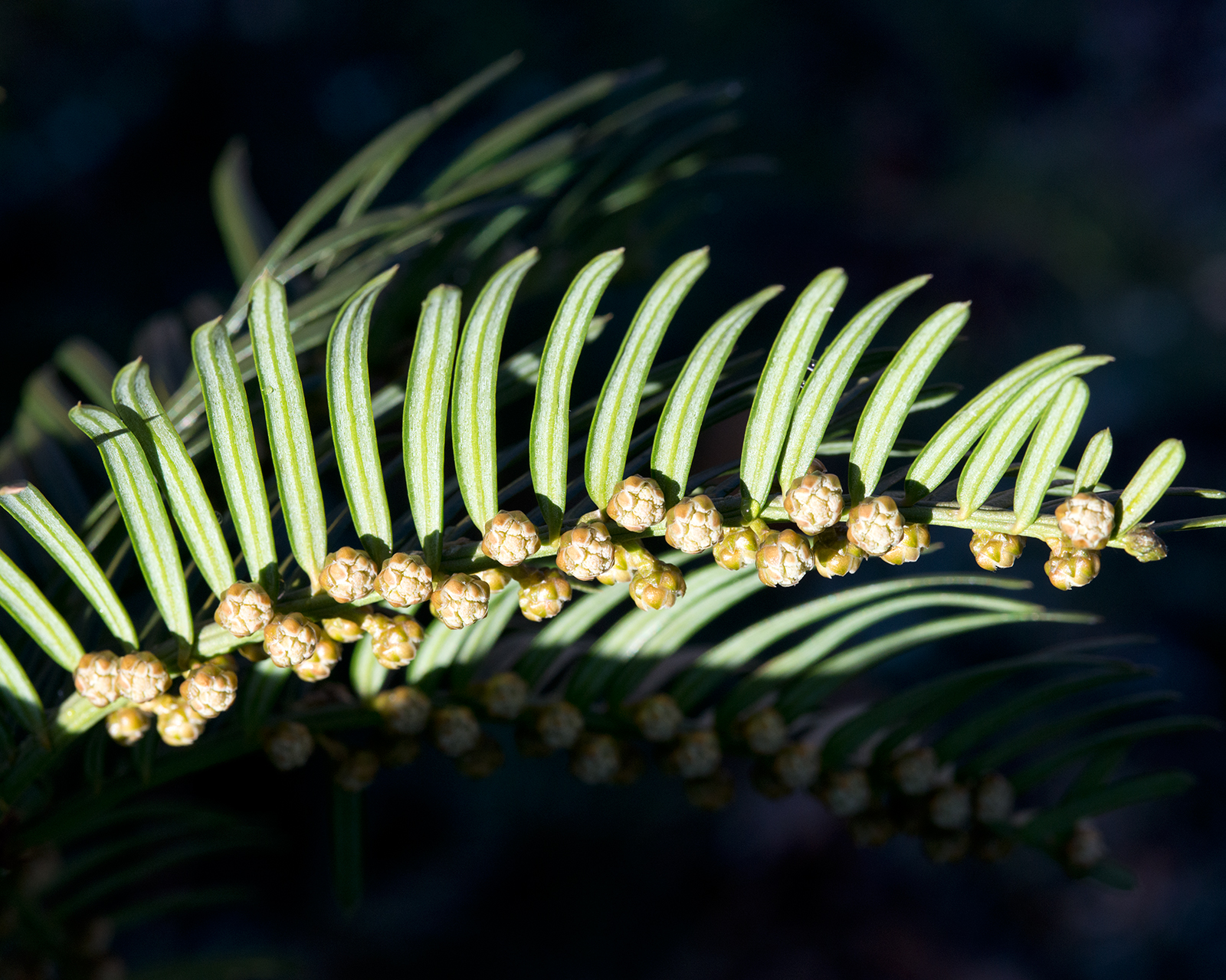
Underside of leaves, together with male cones

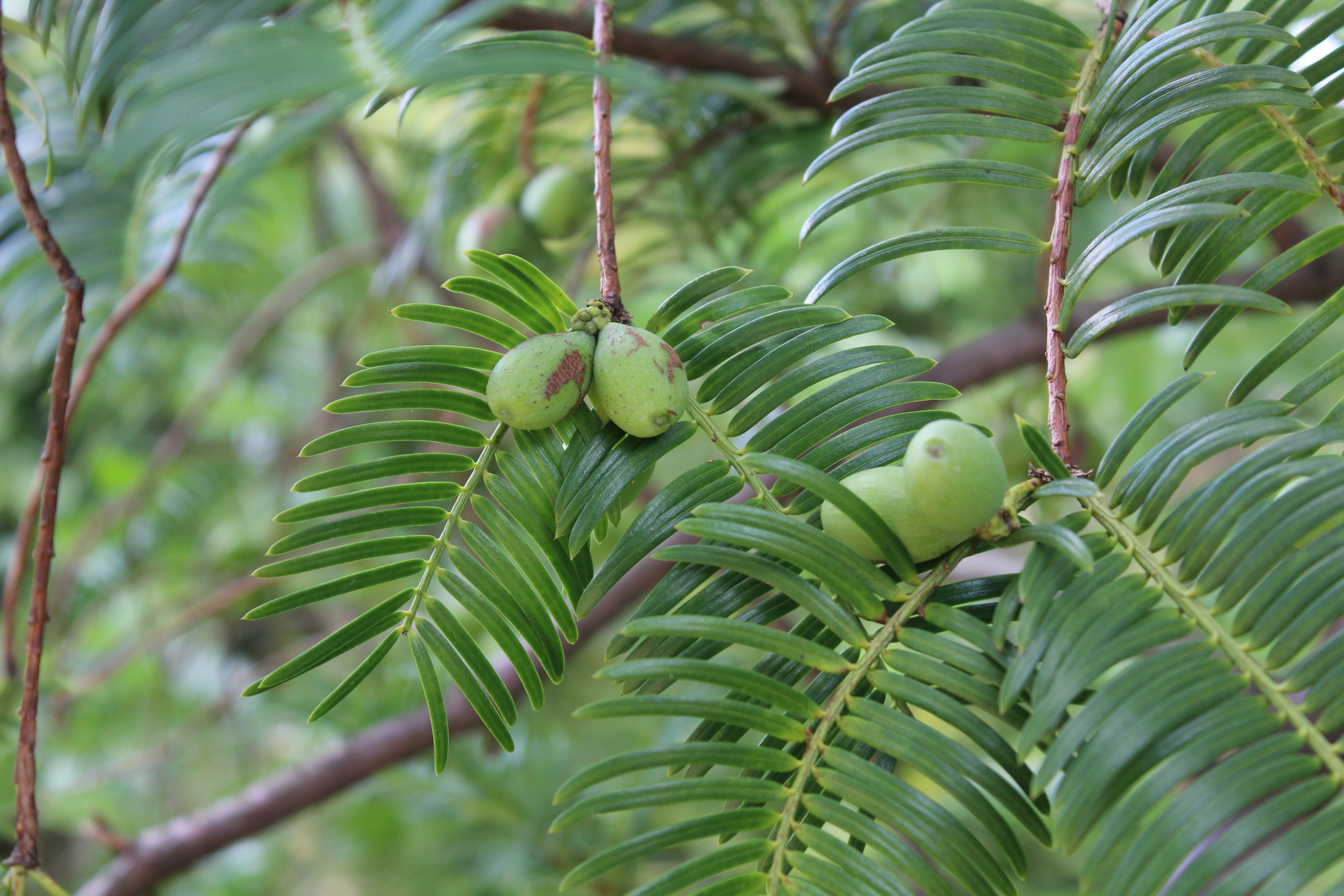
Fruit (female) and upperside of leaves

== Cultivation ==
Cephalotaxus harringtonii has been in cultivation in the United Kingdom since 1829 and is infrequently encountered as a garden specimen. Of the several species that exist in the genus, C. harringtonii is the one most often encountered in western gardens. Several cultivars exist:

- 'Fastigiata' was first selected in 1861 in Japan. It grows to 6 metres in height and it characterised by its broad cluster of erect stems and very dark green leaves that spread all around the stem and are strongly decurved. The shoots are unbranched in the upper parts of the plant, while the lower parts have somewhat chaotic projecting side-shoots that hang down and contain leaves in flat ranks. The flowers are also inconspicuous.
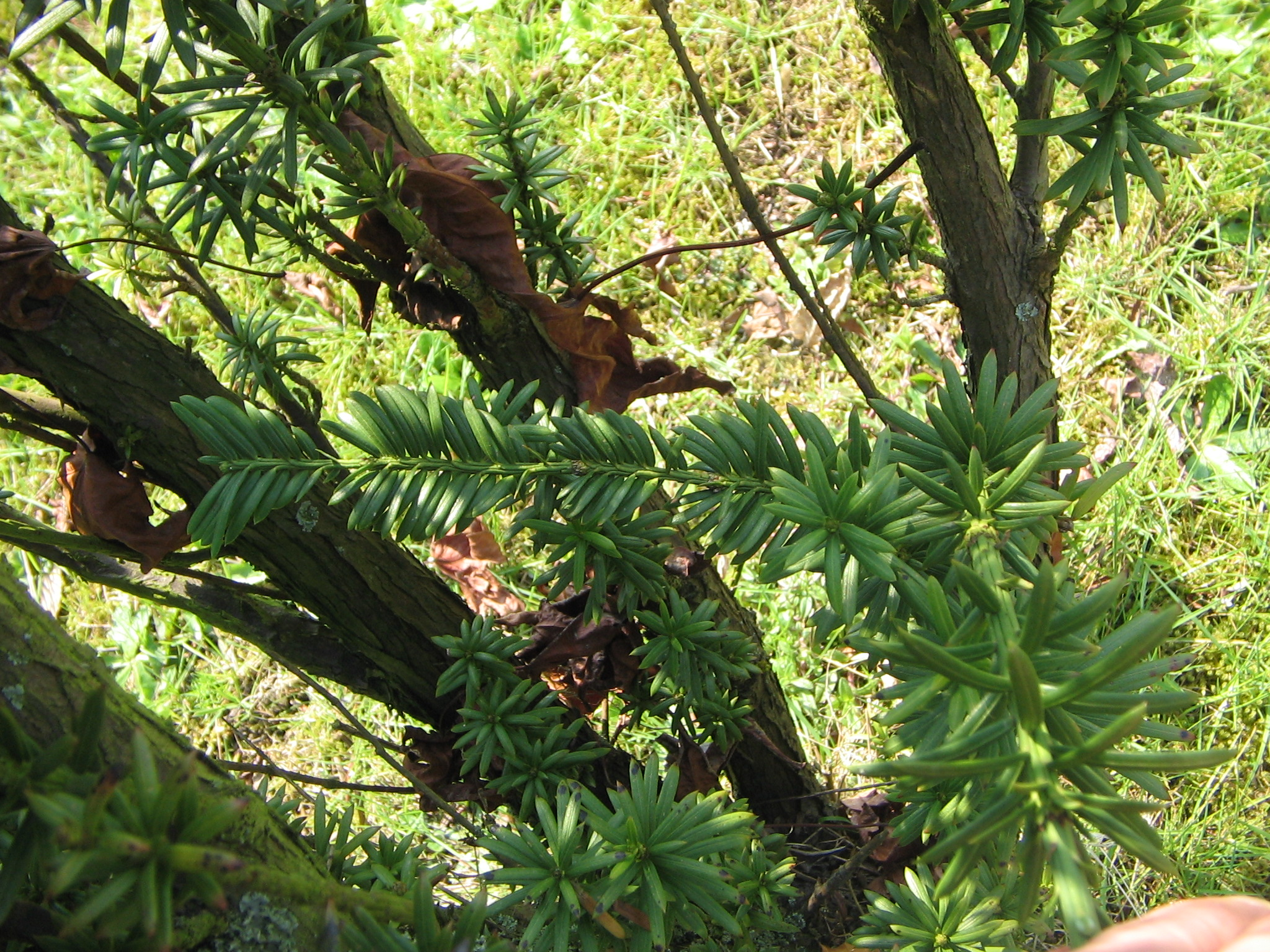
'Fastigiata' plant with a chaotically projecting side-shoot

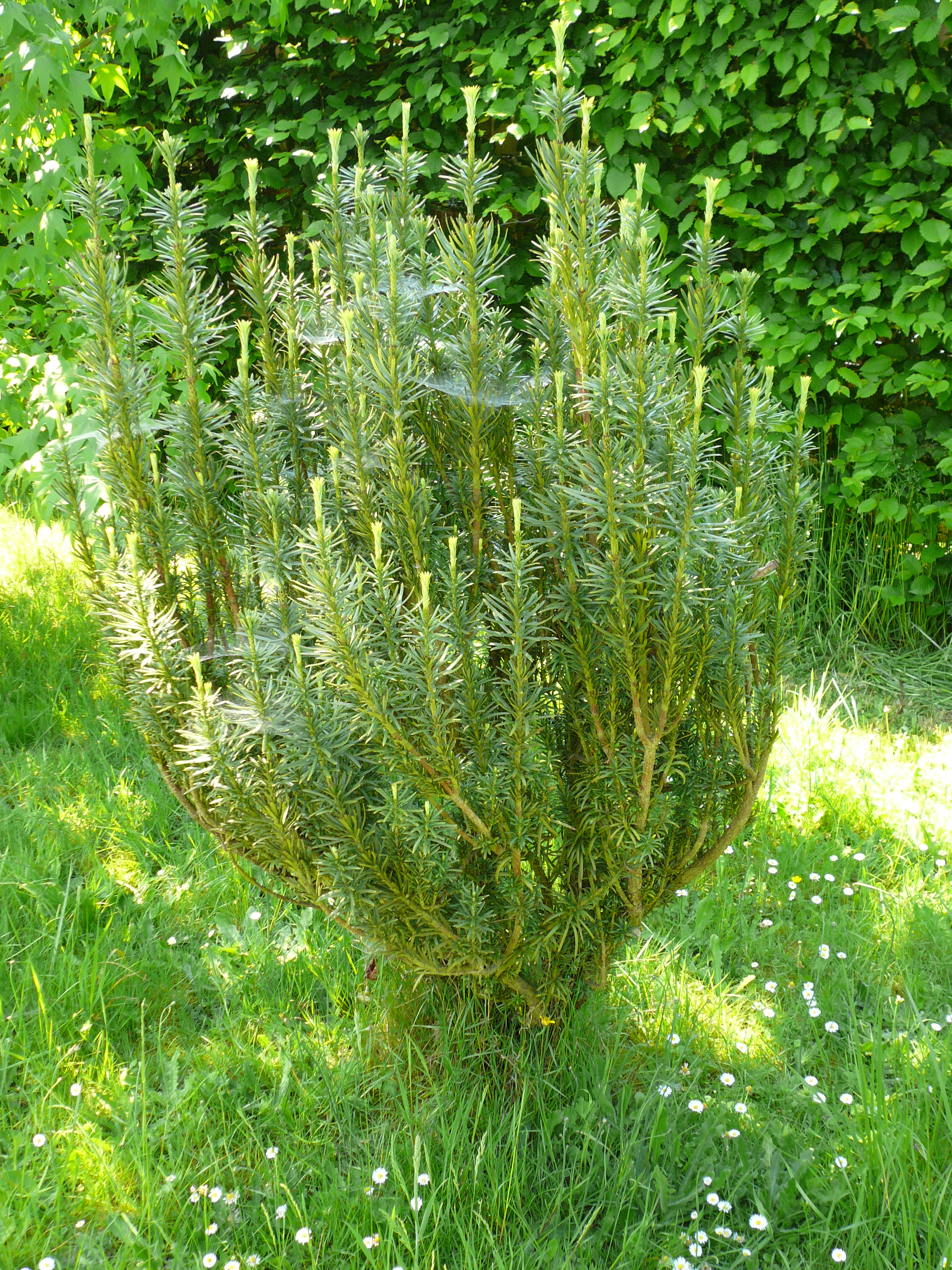
Cephalotaxus harringtonii 'Fastigiata'

=== Pharmaceutics ===
Omacetaxine, a substance derived from the leaves of this plant, is a novel (as of 2008) anti-leukemia drug.

Alkaloids of cephalotaxus harringtonia var drupacea. 11-Hydroxycephalotaxine and drupacine.
