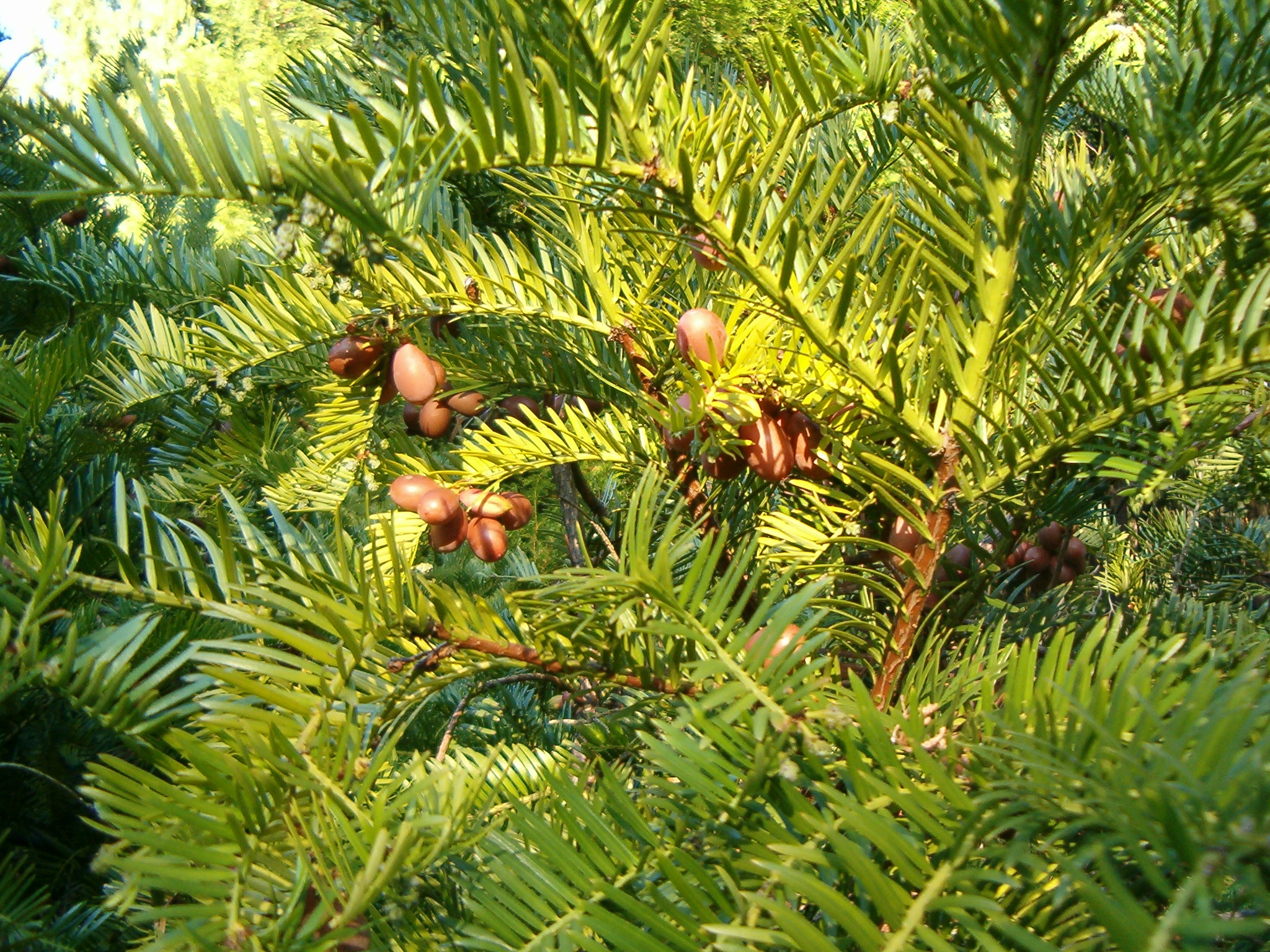
- Cephalotaxus harringtonii

Scientific classification
- Kingdom: Plantae
- Clade: Tracheophytes
- Clade: Gymnosperms
- Division: Pinophyta
- Class: Pinopsida
- Order: Cupressales
- Family: Cephalotaxaceae
- Genus: Cephalotaxus; Siebold & Zucc. ex Endl.

Type species
- Cephalotaxus pedunculata Siebold & Zucc. ex Endl.

Species
- C. fortunei; C. griffithii; C. hainanensis; C. harringtonii; C. koreana; C. lanceolata; C. latifolia; C. mannii; C. oliveri; C. sinensis; C. wilsoniana

= Cephalotaxus =

Cephalotaxus Temporal range: Cretaceous–Recent

Genus of conifers

Cephalotaxus, commonly called plum-yew or cowtail-pine, is a genus of conifers comprising 11 species, either considered the only member of the family Cephalotaxaceae, or in the Taxaceae when that family is considered in a broad sense. The genus is endemic to eastern Asia, though fossil evidence shows it had a wider Northern Hemisphere distribution in the past. The species are shrubs and small trees reaching 1.0–10 metres (3–33 ft) (rarely to 20 metres (66 ft)) tall.

== Description ==
The leaves are spirally arranged on the shoots, but twisted at the base to lie in two flat ranks (except on erect leading shoots); they are linear, 4–12 centimetres (1 1/2–4 3/4 in) long and 3–4 millimetres (1/8–5/32 in) broad, soft in texture, with a blunt tip; this helps distinguish them from the related genus Torreya, which has spine-tipped leaves.

The species can be either monoecious or dioecious; when monoecious, the male and female cones are often on different branches. The male (pollen) cones are 5–8 millimetres (13/64–5/16 in) long, grouped in lines along the underside of a shoot. The female (seed) cones are single or grouped two to 15 together on short stems; minute at first, they mature in about 18 months to a drupe-like structure with the single large nut-like seed 1.5–4 centimetres (5/8–1 5/8 in) long surrounded by a fleshy covering, green to purple at full maturity. Natural dispersal is thought to be aided by squirrels which bury the seeds for a winter food source; any seeds left uneaten are then able to germinate.

== Phytochemistry ==
Cephalotaxus species produce cephalotaxine, an alkaloid. Parry et al 1980 provides evidence that cephalotaxine is a phenylethylisoquinoline. However, they also find this genus to be unable to incorporate cinnamic acid into cephalotaxine, and incorporation of cinnamic acid is usually a step in phenylethylisoquinoline syntheses, throwing the phenylethylisoquinoline theory in to question.

== Systematics ==
Some molecular studies place Cephalotaxus as the most basal member of the Taxaceae, having a very ancient divergence from them during the late Triassic, but others have recovered it as deeply embedded in Taxaceae, sister to Amentotaxus and Torreya, with these three then sister to [Taxus plus Pseudotaxus]. Historically, it was placed as the only member of the family Cephalotaxaceae, due to strong morphological differences from other members of Taxaceae, but major authorities consider the family synonymous with Taxaceae.

=== Extant species ===
The taxonomy of Cephalotaxus is difficult, because the species have been defined using characteristics that intergrade with each other, such as the length and shape of needles, bark, and stomatal band colour. Cephalotaxus species have often been separated geographically rather than morphologically.

Phylogeny of Cephalotaxus

- Cephalotaxus
  - C. oliveri Masters
  - - C. harringtonii (Knight ex Forbes) Koch
    - - C. hainanensis Li
      - - C. mannii Hooker
        - - C. sinensis (Rehder & Wilson) Li
          - - C. drupacea Siebold & Zuccarini
            - - C. nana Nakai
              - - C. griffithii Hooker
                - - C. lanceolata Feng ex Cheng, Fu & Cheng
                  - C. fortunei Hooker

=== Fossil record ===
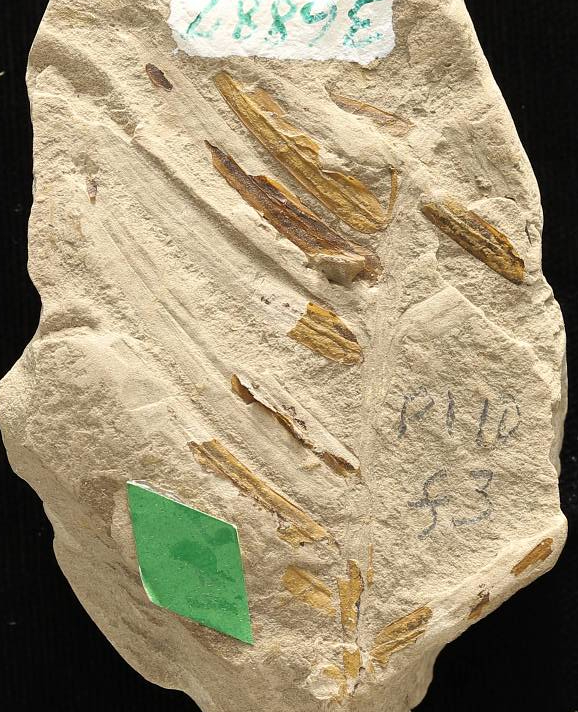
Cephalotaxus bonseri Latah Formation, Miocene

The oldest fossils of Cephalotaxus are known from the Eocene of Heilongjiang in northeast China and the Messel Pit of Germany. The youngest fossils of Cephalotaxus in Europe date to the Pliocene, and remains are also known from the Miocene of western North America.

- Cephalotaxus akitaensis Huzioka - leafy twigs; Miocene, Utto Formation, Akita Prefecture, Japan
- Cephalotaxus biumbonata Miki - seeds; Pliocene, Toki, Gifu, Japan
- Cephalotaxus bonseri (Knowlton) R.W. Chaney & Axelrod - leafy twigs; Miocene, Latah Formation, Washington, US
- Cephalotaxus bowerbankii Reid & Chandler - seeds; Eocene, London Clay, Isle of Sheppey, England
- Cephalotaxus californica Potbury - leafy twigs; Oligocene, La Porte flora, California, US
- Cephalotaxus cretacea Samylina - leafy twigs; Cretaceous, Aldan River, Yakutia, Russia
- Cephalotaxus eigensis Mai - leafy twigs; Miocene, Schönau-Berzdorf, Saxony, Germany
- Cephalotaxus europaea Mai - leafy twigs; Miocene, Görlitz; Czech Republic
- Cephalotaxus francofurtana Kinkelin - seeds; Pliocene, Klärbecken Flora, Niederrad, Frankfurt am Main, Germany
- Cephalotaxus loossi Kinkelin - seeds; Pliocene, Klärbecken Flora, Niederrad, Frankfurt am Main, Germany
- Cephalotaxus messelensis Wilde - leafy twigs; Eocene, Messel Formation, Darmstadt-Dieburg, Hessen, Germany
- Cephalotaxus microphylla Sveshnikova & Budantsev - leafy twigs; Cretaceous, Salisbury Island, Arkhangelsk, Russia
- Cephalotaxus miocenica (Kräusel) Gregor - seeds; Miocene, Nowa Wieś Królewska, Województwo opolskie, Poland
- Cephalotaxus multiserialis (Weyl.) Mai & Walther - leafy twigs; Miocene, Düren Kreis, Rhine-Westphalia, Germany
- Cephalotaxus obovata Miki - seeds; Pliocene, Toge, Hyogo, Japan
- Cephalotaxus parvifolia (Walther) Kvaček & Walther - leafy twigs; Oligocene, Seifhennersdorf, Sachsen, Germany
- Cephalotaxus pliocaenica Mädler - leafy twigs; Pliocene, Klärbecken Flora, Niederrad, Frankfurt am Main, Germany
- Cephalotaxus rotundata Kinkelin - seeds; Pliocene, Klärbecken Flora, Niederrad, Frankfurt am Main, Germany
- Cephalotaxus saxonica Mai & Walther - leafy twigs; Eocene, Phönix-Nord, Sachsen, Germany
- Cephalotaxus stoeckleinorum Knobloch - leafy twigs; Miocene, Achldorf, Bavaria, Germany
- Cephalotaxus yubariensis Se. Endô - leafy twigs; Eocene, Ikushunbetsu Formation, Yubari River, Hokkaido, Japan
