= Nucleic acid inhibitor =

Compounds that inhibit cell production of DNA or RMA

Image illustrates DNA, RNA, and protein synthesis. The first two are nucleic acids.

A nucleic acid inhibitor is a type of antibacterial that acts by inhibiting the production of nucleic acids. There are two major classes: DNA inhibitors and RNA inhibitors. The antifungal flucytosine acts in a similar manner.

== DNA inhibitors ==
Classic DNA inhibitors such as the quinolones act upon DNA gyrase as a topoisomerase inhibitor. Another group of DNA inhibitors, including nitrofurantoin and metronidazole, act upon anaerobic bacteria. These act by generating metabolites that are incorporated into DNA strands, which then are more prone to breakage. These drugs are selectively toxic to anaerobic organisms, but can affect human cells.

== RNA inhibitors ==
RNA inhibitors such as rifampin, act upon DNA-dependent RNA polymerase.

== Antifolates (DNA, RNA, and protein) ==
Antifolates act primarily as inhibitors of both RNA and DNA, and are often grouped with nucleic acid inhibitors in textbooks. However, they also act indirectly as protein synthesis inhibitors (because tetrahydrofolate is also involved in the synthesis of amino acids serine and methionine), so they are sometimes considered as their own category, antimetabolites. However, the term "antimetabolite", when used literally, can apply to many different classes of drugs.
