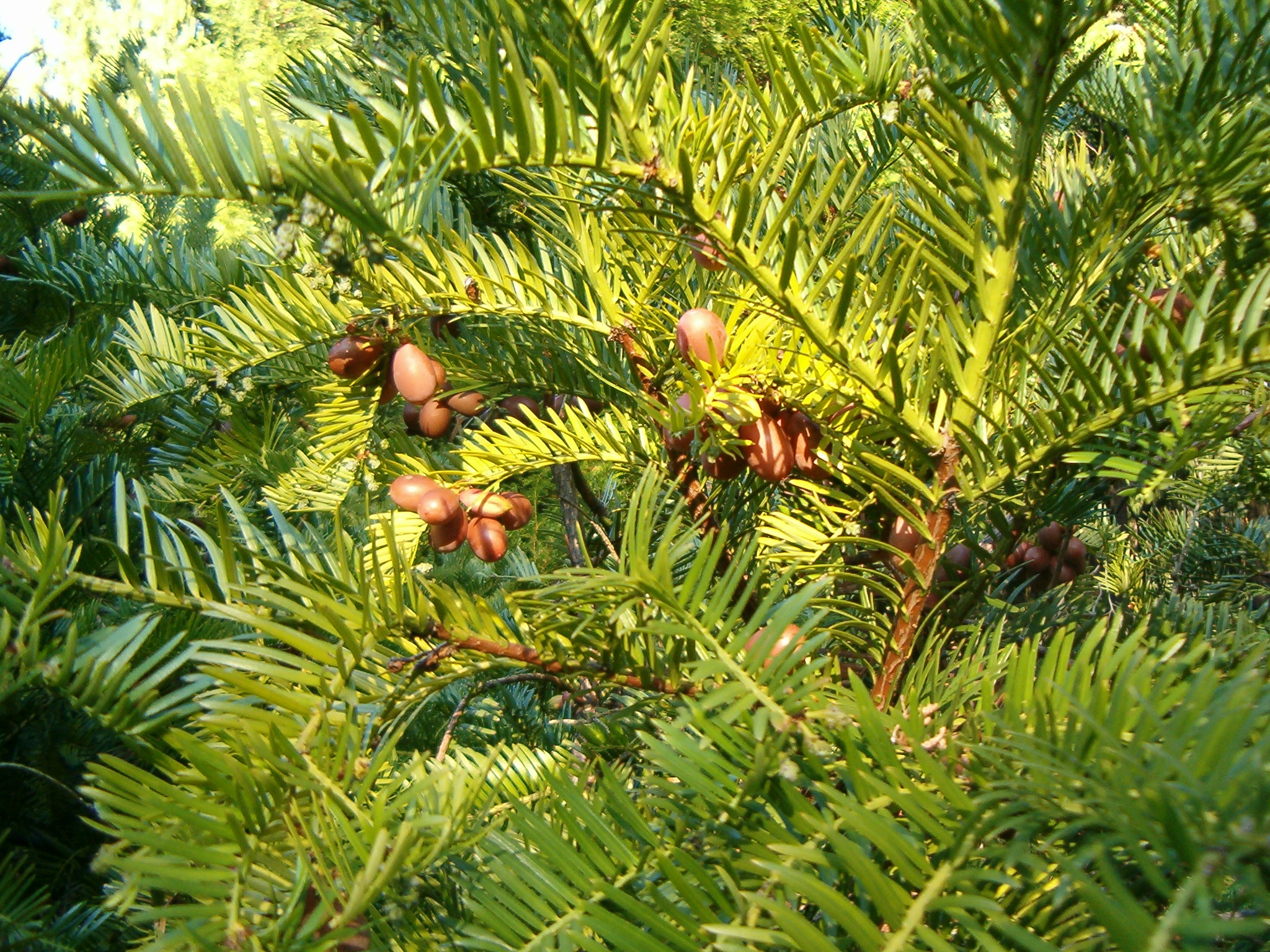
- Specimen of Cephalotaxus harringtonii

Scientific classification
- Kingdom: Plantae
- Clade: Tracheophytes
- Clade: Gymnosperms
- Division: Pinophyta
- Class: Pinopsida
- Order: Cupressales
- Family: Cephalotaxaceae; Neger

Genera
- Amentotaxus (disputed); †Cephalotaxites; †Cephalotaxospermum; Cephalotaxus; †Thomasiocladus; Torreya (disputed)

= Cephalotaxaceae =

Family of conifers

Cephalotaxaceae, the plum-yew family, is a small family of conifers. According to some recent phylogenetic analyses, it is a monophyletic family, including only the single living genus Cephalotaxus, while others also include Torreya and Amentotaxus; it also includes several fossil genera. Cephalotaxaceae is closely allied to the yew family Taxaceae, and is often included in a wide interpretation of Taxaceae, based on phylogenetic evidence and close morphological similarities between them. The species are currently restricted to east Asia, except for two species of Torreya found in the southwest and southeast of the United States; fossil evidence however shows a much wider prehistorical Northern Hemisphere distribution. The most notable differences between Taxaceae and Cephalotaxaceae in its broad sense concerns the cone aril, which fully encloses the seeds of Cephalotaxaceae, the longer maturation of Cephalotaxaceae seeds, and the larger size of the mature seeds.

When considered as a distinct family, members of Cephalotaxaceae are much branched, small trees and shrubs. The leaves are evergreen, spirally arranged, but (except on erect lead shoots) usually twisted at the base to appear distichous, in two ranks either side of the shoot. They are linear to lanceolate, and have pale green or white stomatal bands on the undersides. The plants are monoecious, subdioecious, or dioecious. The male cones are 4–25 mm long, and shed pollen in the early spring. The female cones are reduced, with one to a few ovuliferous scales, and one seed on each ovuliferous scale. As the seed matures, the ovuliferous scale develops into a fleshy aril fully enclosing the seed. The mature aril is thin, green, purple or red, soft and resinous. Each ovuliferous scale remains discrete, so the cone develops into a short stem with one to a few berry-like seeds. They are probably eaten by birds or other animals which then disperse the hard seed undamaged in their droppings, but seed dispersal mechanisms in the family are not yet well researched.
