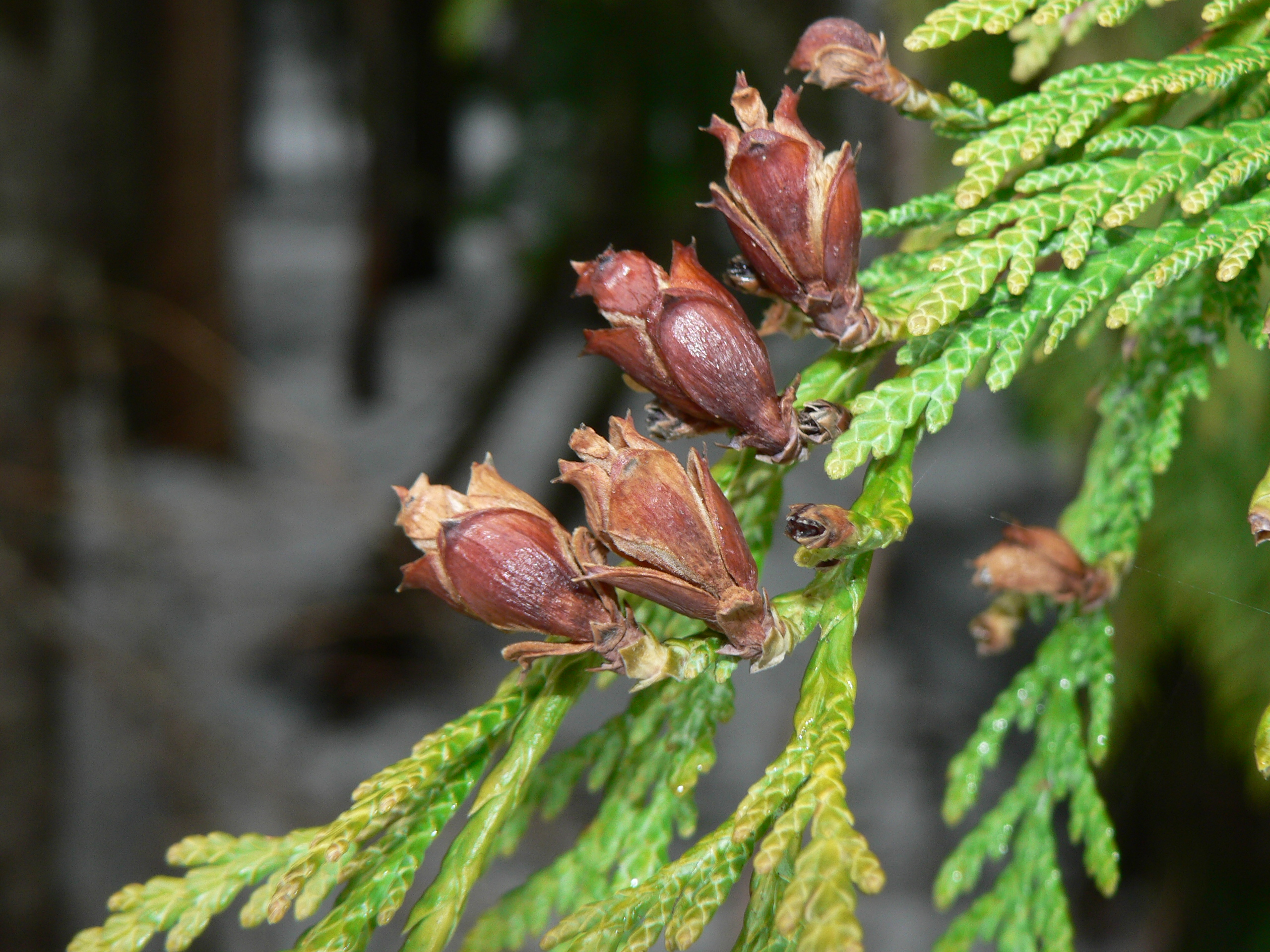
- Thuja plicata, in Cupressaceae
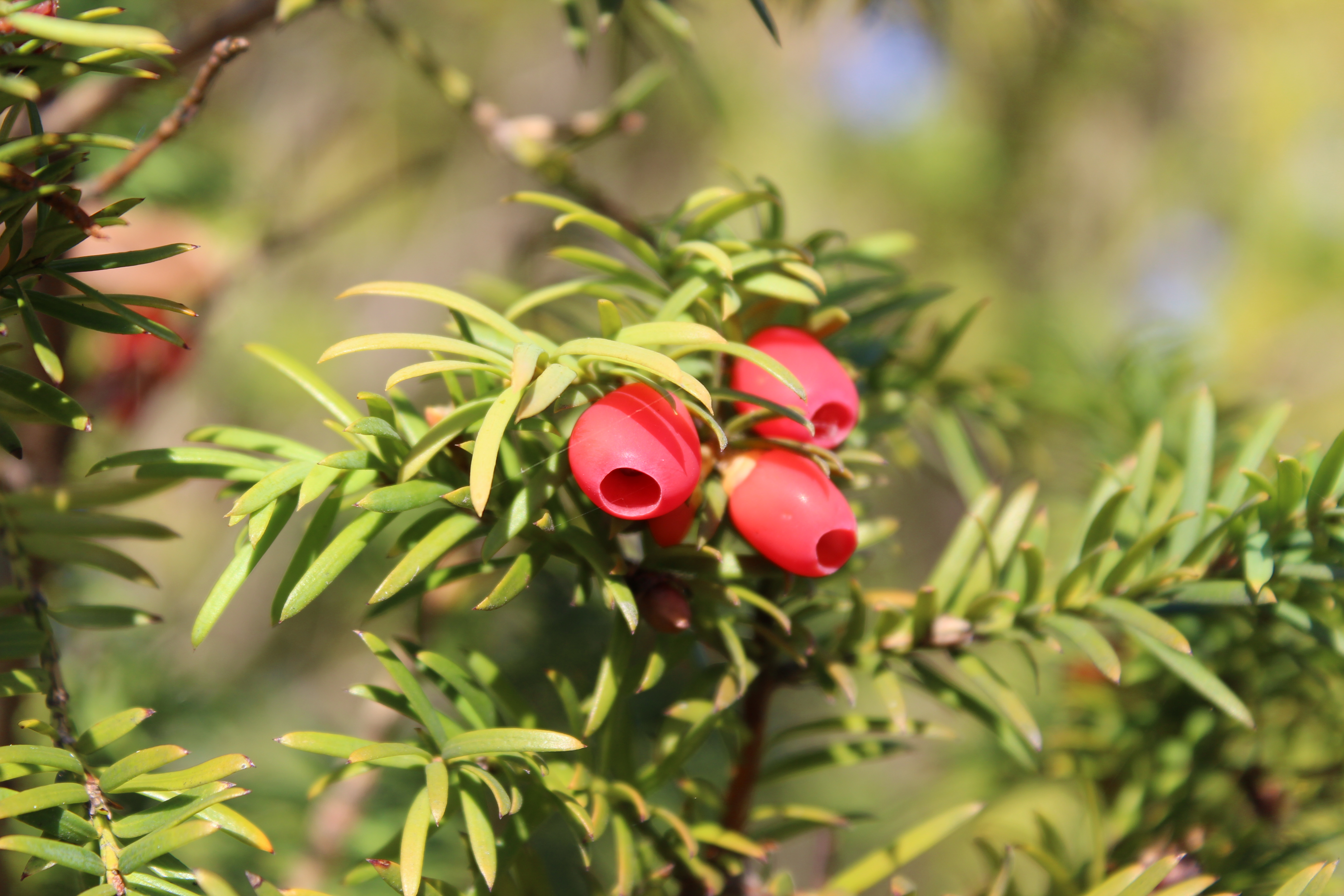
- Taxus baccata, in Taxaceae

Scientific classification
- Kingdom: Plantae
- Clade: Tracheophytes
- Clade: Gymnospermae
- Division: Pinophyta
- Class: Pinopsida
- Subclass: Cupressidae
- Order: Cupressales; Emberger

Families
- Sciadopityaceae; Cupressaceae; Cephalotaxaceae; Taxaceae

= Cupressales =

Order of plants

Cupressales is one of two orders of conifers within the subclass Cupressidae. It comprises three or four families:

- Sciadopityaceae (a single genus with a single species Sciadopitys verticillata, endemic to Japan)
- Cupressaceae (cypress family, with 25–30 genera depending on interpretation)
- Taxaceae (yew family, with 5–6 genera depending on interpretation)
- Cephalotaxaceae (a single genus, Cephalotaxus; sometimes included in the Taxaceae, and sometimes counted as a separate family)

All species in the order are woody plants; they range from small shrubs to the largest trees in existence.
