= Yew =

Common name for several species of tree

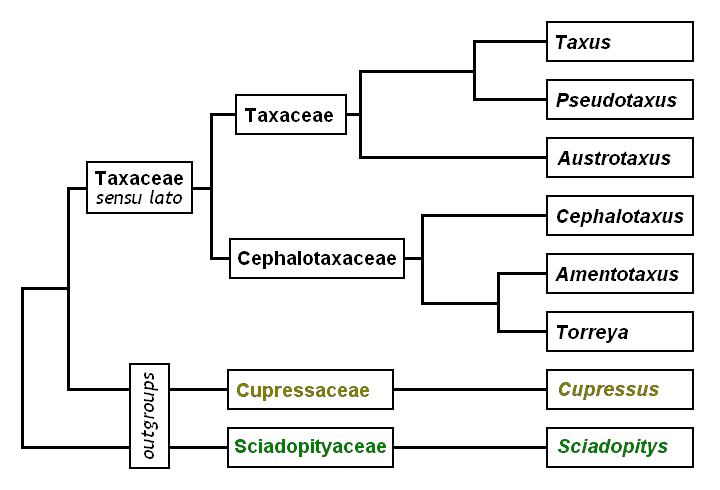
Phylogeny of the Taxaceae and Cephalotaxaceae

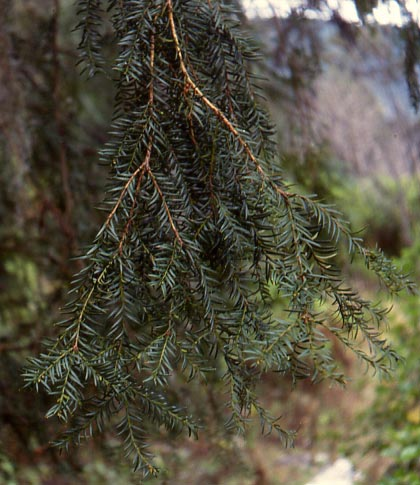
Foliage of a Mexican yew

Yew is a common name given to various species of trees.

It is most prominently given to any of various coniferous trees and shrubs in the genus Taxus:

- European yew or common yew (Taxus baccata)
- Pacific yew or western yew (Taxus brevifolia)
- Canadian yew (Taxus canadensis)
- Chinese yew (Taxus chinensis)
- Japanese yew (Taxus cuspidata)
- Florida yew (Taxus floridana)
- Mexican yew (Taxus globosa)
- Sumatran yew (Taxus sumatrana)
- Himalayan yew (Taxus wallichiana)
- †Taxus masonii (Eocene fossil yew)

It is also used for any of various coniferous plants in the families Taxaceae and Cephalotaxaceae:

- White-berry yew (Pseudotaxus chienii)
- New Caledonian yew or southern yew (Austrotaxus spicata)
- Catkin-yew (Amentotaxus sp.)
- Plum-yew (Cephalotaxus sp.)

Various coniferous plants in the family Podocarpaceae, superficially similar to other yews, are also known by this name:

- Prince Albert's yew (Saxegothaea conspicua)
- Plum-yew (Prumnopitys sp.)
