= Taxinine M =

Names
- IUPAC name [(1R,2R,3S,4R,5R,6S,8S,10R,11R,12R,15S)-3,4,6,11-tetraacetyloxy-2,8-dihydroxy-1,15-dimethyl-9-methylidene-13-oxo-16-oxatetracyclo[10.5.0.0^{2,15}.0^{5,10}]heptadecan-5-yl]methyl benzoate

Identifiers
CAS Number	135730-55-1
3D model (JSmol)	Interactive image
ChemSpider	4885266
PubChem CID	131908
- InChI: InChI=1S/C35H42O14/c1-17-23(40)13-25(46-18(2)36)34(16-44-31(42)22-11-9-8-10-12-22)26(17)28(47-19(3)37)27-24(41)14-33(7)35(43,32(27,6)15-45-33)30(49-21(5)39)29(34)48-20(4)38/h8-12,23,25-30,40,43H,1,13-16H2,2-7H3/t23-,25-,26-,27-,28+,29-,30-,32-,33-,34+,35-/m0/s1 Key: NLPSSNXRGVDJMP-NTOIUUNRSA-N
- SMILES: CC(=O)O[C@H]1C[C@@H](C(=C)[C@@H]2[C@@]1([C@H]([C@@H]([C@]3([C@@]4(CC(=O)[C@@H]([C@@H]2OC(=O)C)[C@@]3(CO4)C)C)O)OC(=O)C)OC(=O)C)COC(=O)C5=CC=CC=C5)O

Properties
Chemical formula	C_{35}H_{42}O_{14}
Molar mass	686.69958
- Except where otherwise noted, data are given for materials in their standard state (at 25 °C [77 °F], 100 kPa). Infobox references

Taxinine M is a tetracyclic taxane isolate derived from Taxus brevifolia, Taxus chinensis, and Taxus mairei.
