= Chinese yew =

The common name Chinese yew refers to either of the following three yew species:

- Taxus celebica
- Taxus chinensis
- Taxus sumatrana
