= Taxus celebica =

Scientific classification
- Kingdom: Plantae
- Clade: Tracheophytes
- Clade: Gymnospermae
- Division: Pinophyta
- Class: Pinopsida
- Order: Cupressales
- Family: Taxaceae
- Genus: Taxus
- Species: T. celebica

Binomial name
- Taxus celebica (Warb.) H.L.Li

Species of conifer

Taxus celebica is a large, evergreen shrub or tree of the yew family (Taxaceae), widespread in China at elevations up to 900 meters (3,000 feet). It is commonly called Chinese yew though the term also refers to the Taxus chinensis or Taxus sumatrana.

The tree is up to 14 m (46 ft) tall and wide and bushy when cultivated. The leaves are up to 4 centimeters (1.5 inches) long — broader than those of most other yews — and often end in a very small, sharp point. The underside of each leaf has two broad yellow stripes and is densely covered with minute projections.

It is, along with other yew species, unsustainably harvested across Asia for their bark and needles, which contain a chemical used in the cancer medication Taxol.
