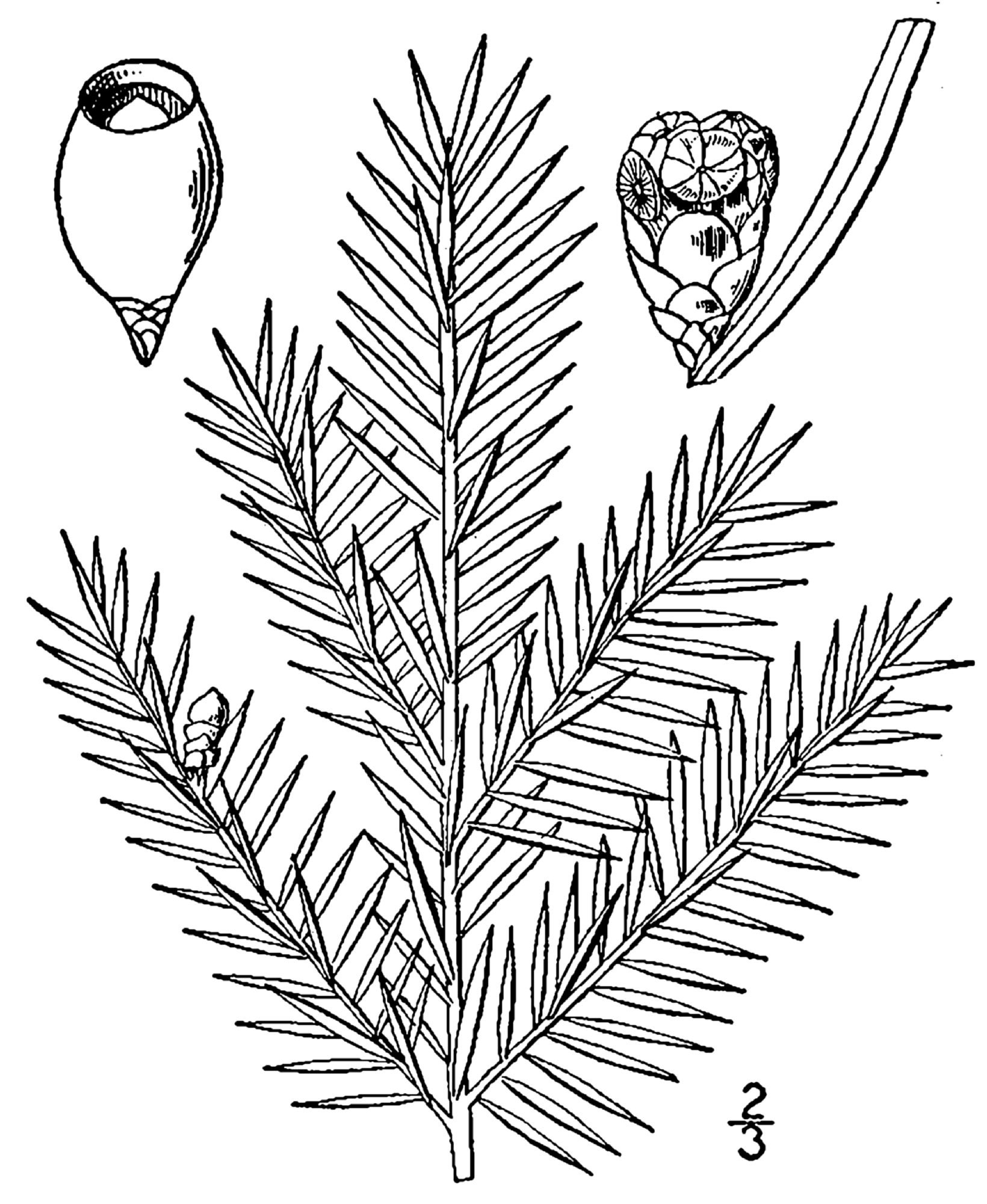

Conservation status
- Least Concern (IUCN 3.1)

- Secure (NatureServe)

Scientific classification
- Kingdom: Plantae
- Clade: Tracheophytes
- Clade: Gymnosperms
- Division: Pinophyta
- Class: Pinopsida
- Order: Cupressales
- Family: Taxaceae
- Genus: Taxus
- Species: T. canadensis

Binomial name
- Taxus canadensis Marshall
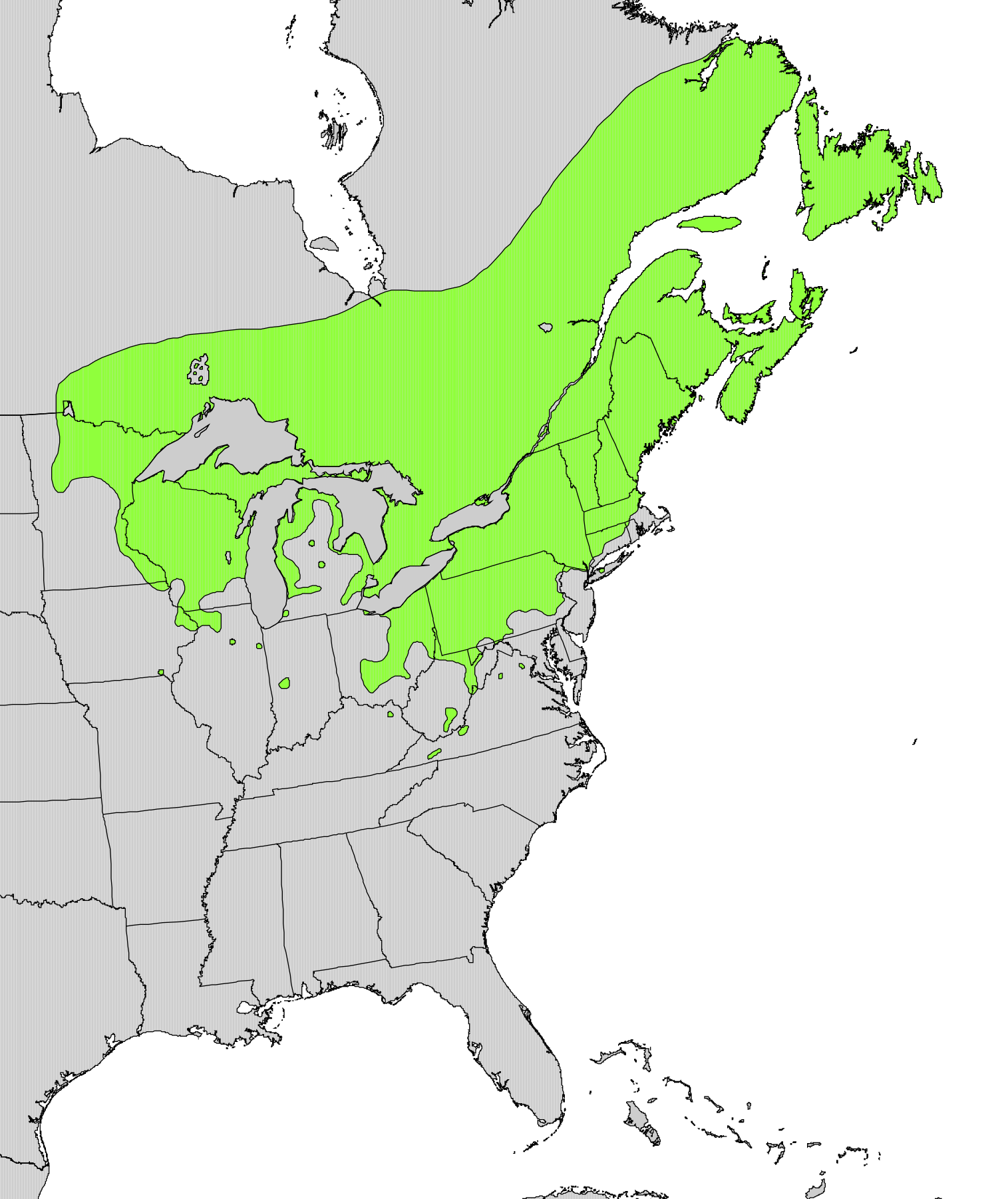
- Natural range of T. canadensis

Synonyms
- Taxus baccata var. minor Michx. 1803; Taxus procumbens Lodd. ex Loudon 1836; Taxus baccata Linnaeus subsp. canadensis (Marshall) Pilger; Taxus baccata var. procumbens Loudon 1842; Taxus baccata var. adpressa Carrière 1855; Taxus baccata var. canadensis (Marshall) A.Gray 1856; Taxus minor (Michx.) Britton 1893; Taxus baccata subsp. canadensis (Marshall) Pilg. 1903; Taxus canadensis var. adpressa (Carrière) Spjut 2007; Taxus canadensis var. minor (Michx.) Spjut 2007

= Taxus canadensis =

Canada yew

Species of plant

Taxus canadensis, the Canada yew or Canadian yew, is a conifer in the family Taxaceae, native to central and eastern North America, thriving in swampy woods, ravines, riverbanks and on lake shores. Locally called "yew", this species is also referred to as American yew or ground-hemlock.

Most of its range is well north of the Ohio River. It is, however, found as a rare ice age relict in some coves of the Appalachian Mountains. The southernmost colonies are known from Ashe and Watauga Counties in North Carolina.

== Description and ecology ==
It is usually a sprawling shrub, rarely exceeding 2.5 m tall. It sometimes forms strong upright central leaders, but these cannot be formed from spreading branches, only from the original leader of the seedling plant. The shrub has thin scaly brown bark. The leaves (needles) are lanceolate, flat, dark green, 1–2.5 cm (3/8–1 inch) long and 1–2.4 mm (0.039–0.094 inches) broad, arranged in two flat rows either side of the branch.

The seed cones are highly modified, each cone containing a single seed partly surrounded by a modified scale which develops into a soft, bright red berry-like structure called an aril, open at the end. The seeds are eaten by thrushes, waxwings and other birds, which disperse the (highly toxic) hard seeds undamaged in their droppings. The male cones are globose, 3 mm in diameter. It is a monoecious plant – one of the few in the genus.

== Uses and traditions ==
All parts of Canadian yew, save the aril, are toxic; it is, however, thought to be of lower toxicity than T. baccata.

Native Americans in its native range used small quantities of yew leaf tea topically or internally for a variety of ailments – notably rheumatism. They are also said to have used yew twigs in steam baths to help alleviate rheumatism. Again, the plant is quite toxic and modern herbalists prefer safer, more effective herbs.

Taxus canadensis is also being harvested in northern Ontario, Québec and Atlantic Canada as the plant is a source of the class of poisonous chemicals known as taxanes, which have been a focus for cancer research. T. canadensis is much more abundant than the near-threatened Taxus brevifolia (Pacific yew), and the "greens" (new growth) can be harvested sustainably every five years, instead of stripping the bark and killing the plant.

The most abundant taxane in T. canadensis is 9-dihydro-13-acetylbaccatin III, which can be effectively converted to 10-deacetylbaccatin III, used in the production of paclitaxel. Two additional taxanes have been identified from T. canadensis, including 7β,10β,13α-triacetoxy-5α-(3'-dimethylamino-3'-phenylpropanoyl)oxy-2α-hydroxy-2(3→20)abeotaxa-4(20),11-dien-9-one; and 2α,10β-diacetoxy-9α-hydroxy-5α-(3'-dimethylamino-3'-phenylpropanoyl)oxy-3,11-cyclotax-4(20)-en-13-one.

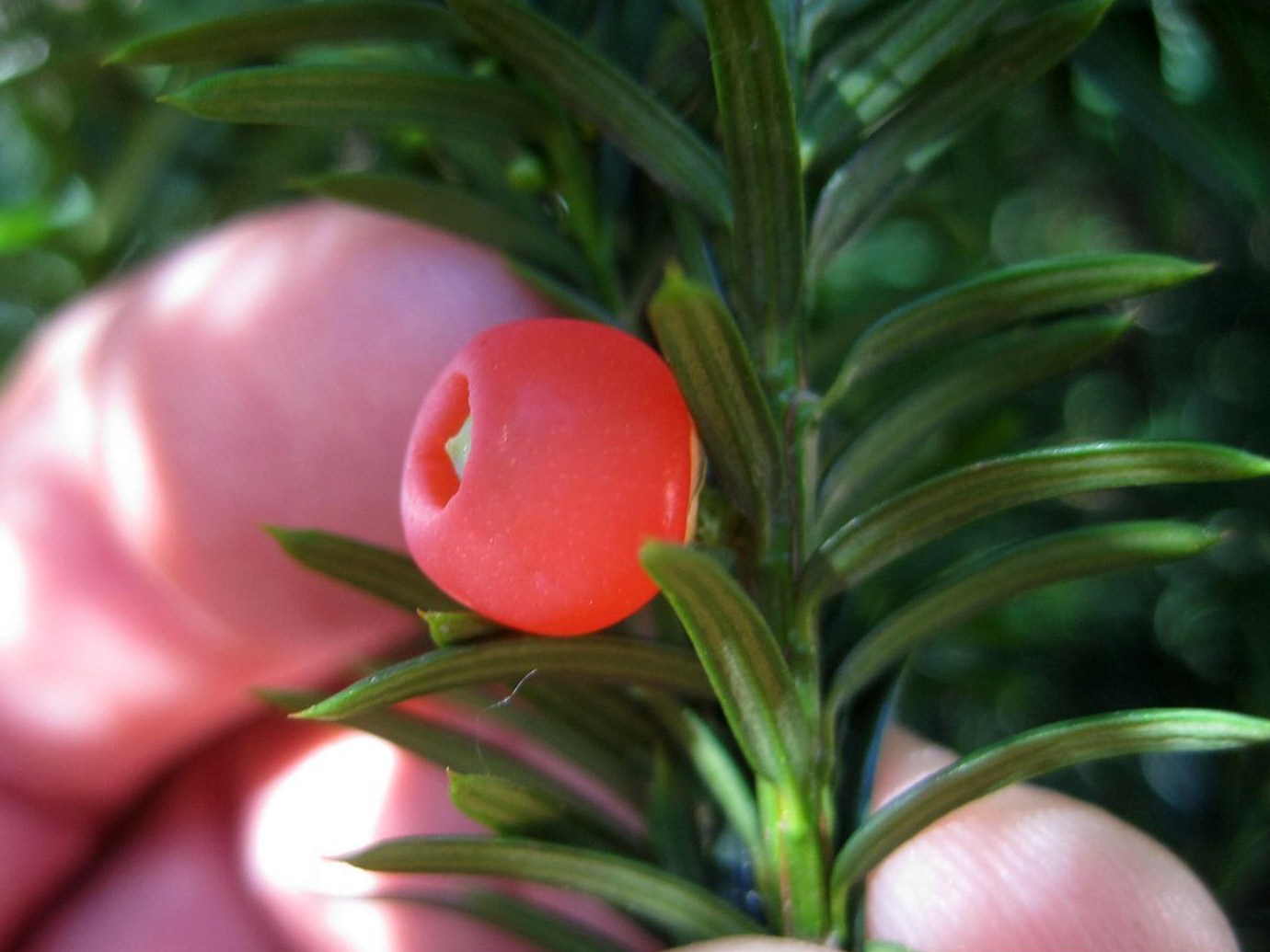
Canada yew aril

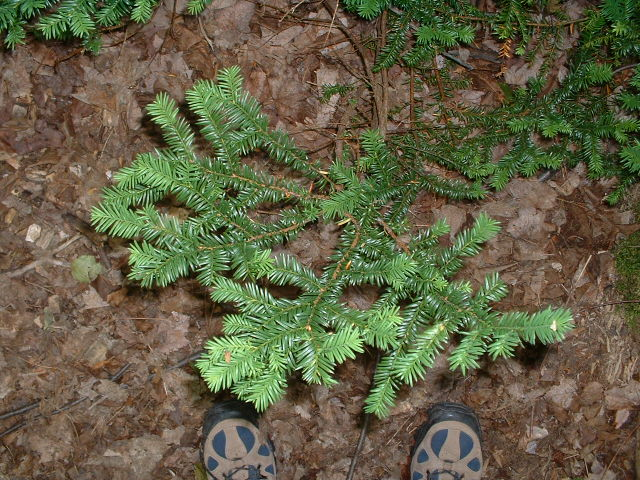
Canada yew
