= Taxus masonii =

Taxus masonii Temporal range: Middle Eocene 45–43mya

Scientific classification
- Kingdom: Plantae
- Clade: Tracheophytes
- Clade: Gymnospermae
- Division: Pinophyta
- Class: Pinopsida
- Order: Cupressales
- Family: Taxaceae
- Genus: Taxus
- Species: †T. masonii

Binomial name
- †Taxus masonii Manchester

Extinct species of conifer

Taxus masonii is an extinct species of conifer in the yew family, Taxaceae, solely known from the middle Eocene sediments exposed in north central Oregon. The species was first described from a series of isolated fossil seeds in chert.

== History and classification ==
Taxus masonii has been identified from a single location in the Clarno Formation, the Clarno nut beds, type locality for both the formation and the species. The nut beds are approximately 3 kilometres (1.9 mi) east of the unincorporated community of Clarno, Oregon, and considered to be middle Eocene in age, based on averaging zircon fission track radiometric dating which yielded an age of 43.6 and 43.7 ± 10 million years ago and Argon–argon dating radiometric dating which yielded a 36.38 ± 1.31 to 46.8 ± 3.36 mya date. The average of the dates resulted in an age range of 45 to 43 mya. The beds are composed of silica and calcium carbonate cemented tuffaceous sandstones, siltstones, and conglomerates which preserve either a lake delta environment, or alternatively periodic floods and volcanic mudflows preserved with hot spring activity.

The species was described from a series of type specimens, the holotype specimen USNM355474, which is currently preserved in the paleobotanical collections of the National Museum of Natural History in Washington, D.C., and fourteen paratype specimens. Four of the paratypes are also in the National Museum collections, while nine are in the University of Florida collections, and the remaining specimen is part of the University of California Museum of Paleontology. The fossils were part of approximately 20,000 specimens collected from 1942 to 1989 by Thomas Bones, Alonzo W. Hancock, R. A. Scott, Steven R. Manchester, and a number of high school students.

The Taxus masonii specimens were studied by paleobotanist Steven R. Manchester of the University of Florida. He published his 1994 type description for T. masonii in the Journal Palaeontographica Americana. The specific epithet masonii was chosen in honor of the botanist Herbert L. Mason, for his work with western North American fossil conifers.

== Description ==
The seeds of Taxus masonii are rounded and bilaterally symmetrical with a pointed tip. The seeds have an overall length ranging between 4.3–6.2 millimetres (0.17–0.24 in) and a width between 4.5–5.6 centimetres (1.8–2.2 in). The seeds are identified as from a Taxus species by the exterior morphology and by the structure of the vascular supply system. The overall cross section shape is lensoid, with a truncate base where an aril would have attached, a keeled apex, and a pair of vascular scars near the base. The vascular supply consists of two vascular strands that extend from the vascular scars near the base along the seed's upper and lower surfaces to points approximately one third of the way towards the apex. The strands then pass into the seed cavity.
