= Taxus contorta =

Conservation status
- Endangered (IUCN 3.1)

Scientific classification
- Kingdom: Plantae
- Clade: Tracheophytes
- Clade: Gymnospermae
- Division: Pinophyta
- Class: Pinopsida
- Order: Cupressales
- Family: Taxaceae
- Genus: Taxus
- Species: T. contorta

Binomial name
- Taxus contorta Griff.

Synonyms
- Taxus fuana Nan Li & R.R.Mill; Taxus wallichiana subsp. contorta (Griff.) Silba

Native Asian Yew tree

Taxus contorta, synonym Taxus fuana, commonly known as the West Himalayan yew, is a species of tree in the genus Taxus. It is native to temperate forests of Afghanistan Northern India, Tibet and Pakistan. It is commonly traded as timber for house construction and furniture, and is regarded as endangered.
