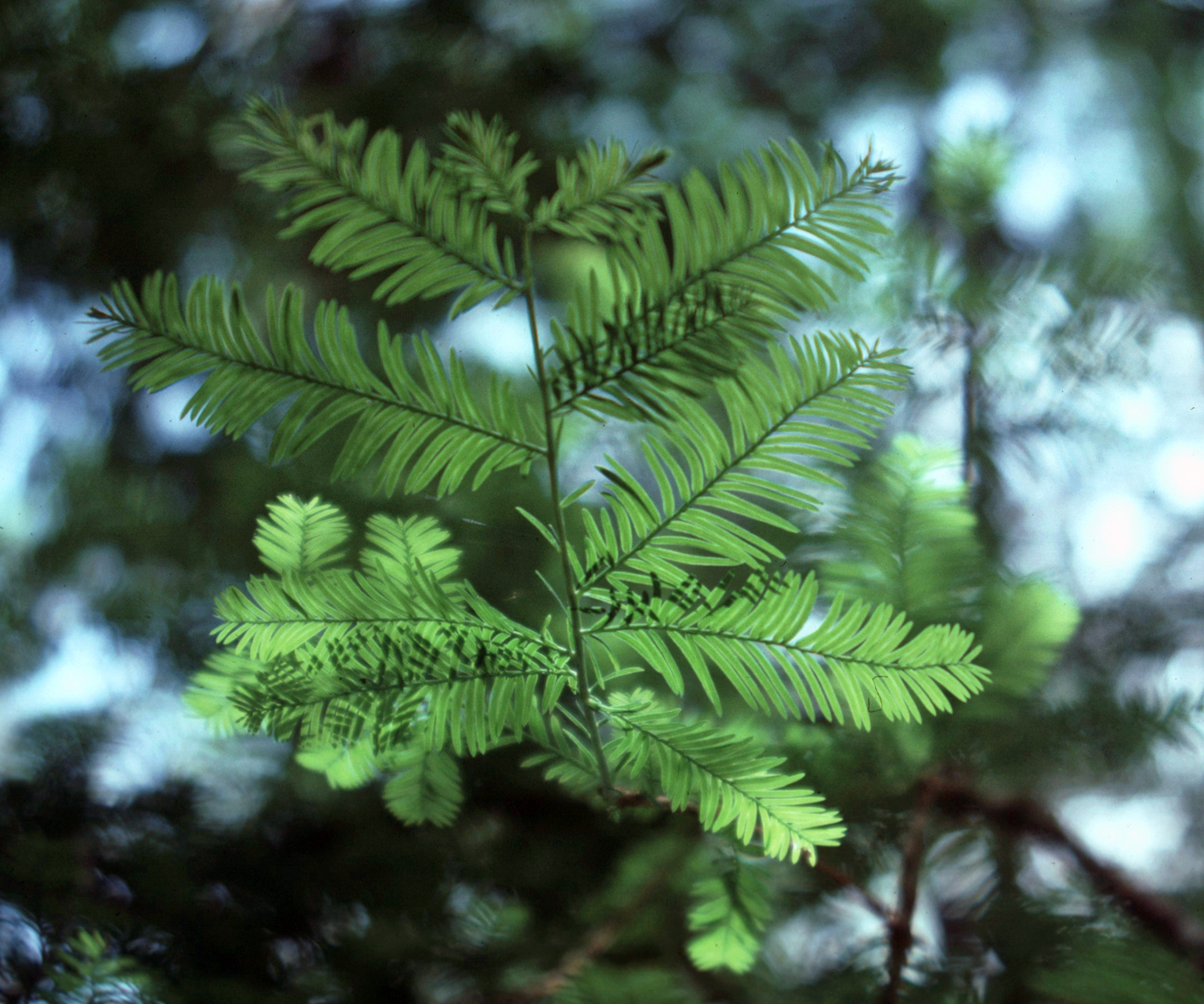

Conservation status
- Critically Endangered (IUCN 3.1)

- Imperiled (NatureServe)

Scientific classification
- Kingdom: Plantae
- Clade: Tracheophytes
- Clade: Gymnospermae
- Division: Pinophyta
- Class: Pinopsida
- Order: Cupressales
- Family: Taxaceae
- Genus: Taxus
- Species: T. floridana

Binomial name
- Taxus floridana Nutt. ex Chapm.
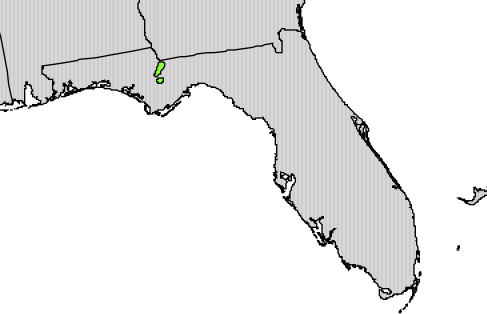
- Natural range

= Taxus floridana =

Critically endangered species of Yew

Taxus floridana, the Florida yew, is a species of yew, endemic to a small area of the Apalachicola River. This species has a restricted extent of occurrence of 24km along the Apalachicola River and resides in the mesophytic forests of northern Florida at altitudes of 15–40 m. It is internationally listed as critically endangered, with a declining population. Although this species was previously listed in the Florida endangered species program, it no longer has legal protection under the U.S. or state endangered species programs. However, the bulk of its very limited historically native range is in protective status at Torreya State Park and the adjacent Nature Conservancy's Apalachicola Bluffs and Ravines Preserve.

== Description ==
It is an evergreen coniferous shrub or small tree growing to 6 m (rarely 10 m) tall, with a trunk up to 38 cm diameter. The bark is thin, scaly purple-brown, and the branches are irregularly orientated. The shoots are green at first, becoming brown after three or four years. The leaves are thin, flat, slightly falcate (sickle-shaped), 1–2.9 cm long and 1–2 mm broad, with a bluntly acute apex; they are arranged spirally on the shoots but twisted at the base to appear in two horizontal ranks on all except for erect lead shoots. Individuals typically occur in clumps and are multi-stemmed with varying stem densities . It is dioecious, with the male and female cones on separate plants; the seed cone is highly modified, berry-like, with a single scale developing into a soft, juicy red aril 1 cm diameter, containing a single dark brown seed 5–6 mm long and occur singly on few leaf axils. The pollen cones are globose, 4 mm diameter, produced on the undersides of the shoots in early spring.

It occurs in the same region as the also-rare Torreya taxifolia and is similar to it in general appearance, but can be differentiated by the shorter, blunt-tipped (not spine-tipped) leaves and the less strong smell of the crushed leaves. Distinction from other yew species is more difficult, and like most yews it has sometimes been treated as a subspecies of Taxus baccata, as T. baccata subsp. floridana (Nutt. ex Chapm.) Pilger.

A 2021 report by Morton Arboretum in northern Illinois states, "There are three species of yew (Taxus) native to the United States. They are notoriously difficult to differentiate visually, but their native distributions do not overlap and therefore they are easily distinguished geographically."

== Ecology ==
Taxus floridana grows slowly, and prefers slightly acidic, well drained soil and partial shade. It is highly fire sensitive as well as shade tolerant. Potential influences on their distribution include variation of soil, aspect, and moisture. There is no indicator species associated with it. It is hardy to USDA zone 8. It can be grown from cuttings or seeds. Seed scarification is required for germination and it persists through layering and sprouting. Birds feed on their cones and excavate stems for insects.

== Uses ==
The bark contains paclitaxel, a mitotic inhibitor used to combat numerous forms of cancer. The inhibitor is called Taxol, but scientists have found new evidence that suggests the taxol is actually produced by the fungus that lives on the Florida yew. The seeds and leaves, however, are poisonous to humans if consumed.

== Threats ==
A 2021 report by Morton Arboretum concludes: "There are no severe pests or diseases facing native U.S. Taxus species and vulnerability to climate change is generally predicted to be low, other than potential impacts to T. canadensis from decreased snowfall and increased deer activity." Thus the primary threats to this species include its severely limited range size, isolated populations within that range, and recruitment failure. Recruitment failure is primarily attributed to overstory shading that limits fruit production on the female specimens, combined with severe herbivory of seedlings and any sapling branches within reach of overpopulated deer throughout its limited range.

The ripened cones of the tree evolved to be distributed primarily by birds who consume the fruits and then defecate the seeds. Herbivores that threaten the vegetative parts of the tree are multiple. Beavers will chew off the tops of young stems, but the only widespread and overpopulated herbivore throughout this yew's entire range is white-tailed deer. Deer browse on branch tips of saplings and mature trees that are within reach. They will also entirely destroy young seedlings. Additional damage to regrowth stems occurs in autumn when antler-rubbing strips off bark. Yews evolved to live in moist habitats, especially in the depth of ravines, and are thus highly sensitive to fire. There are a few populations located on unprotected private lands, which are therefore particularly susceptible to human-caused destruction by logging and urban development. All these threats have contributed to no new recruitment in the past few decades, greatly affecting population demographics.

== Conservation ==
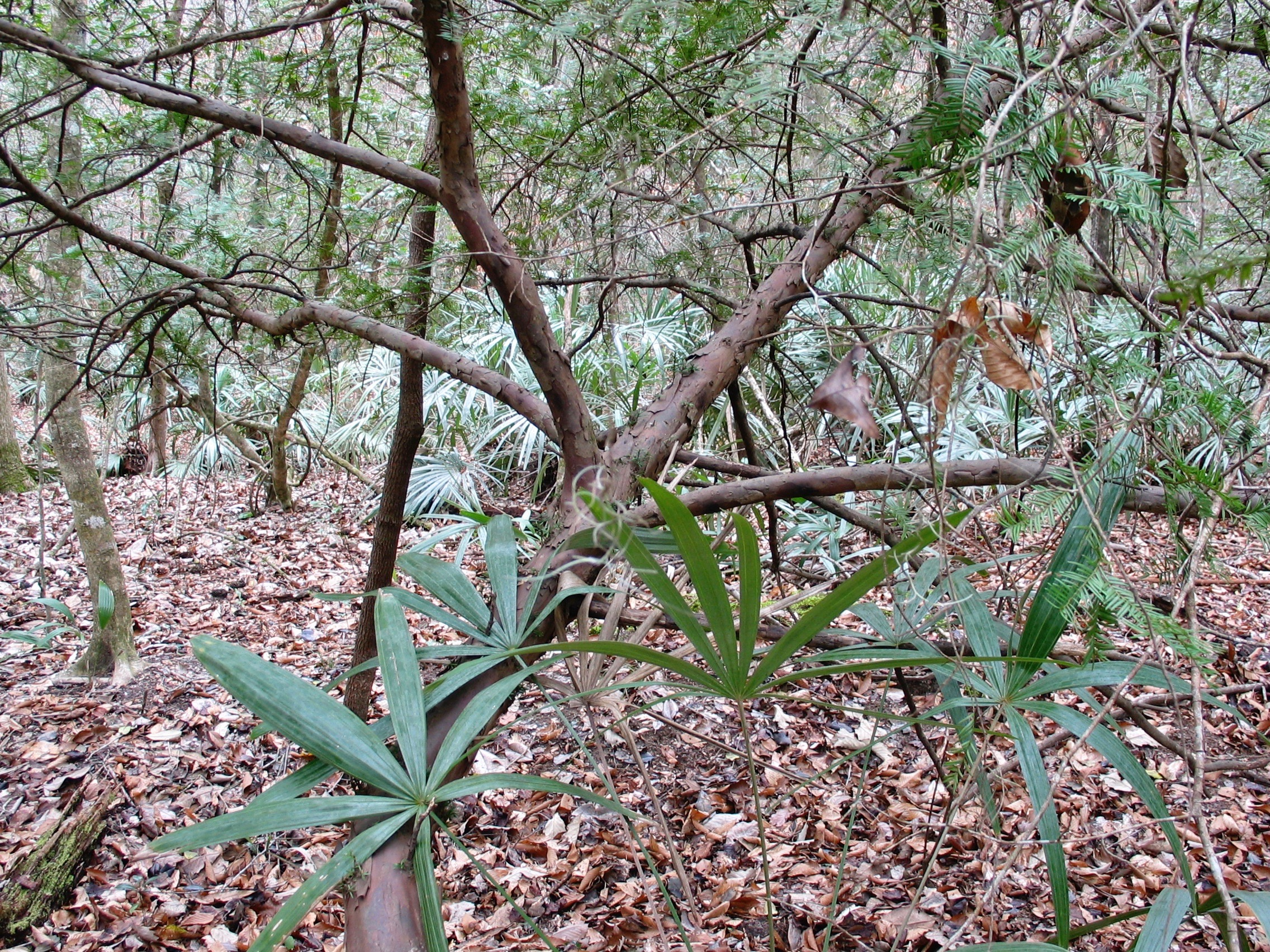
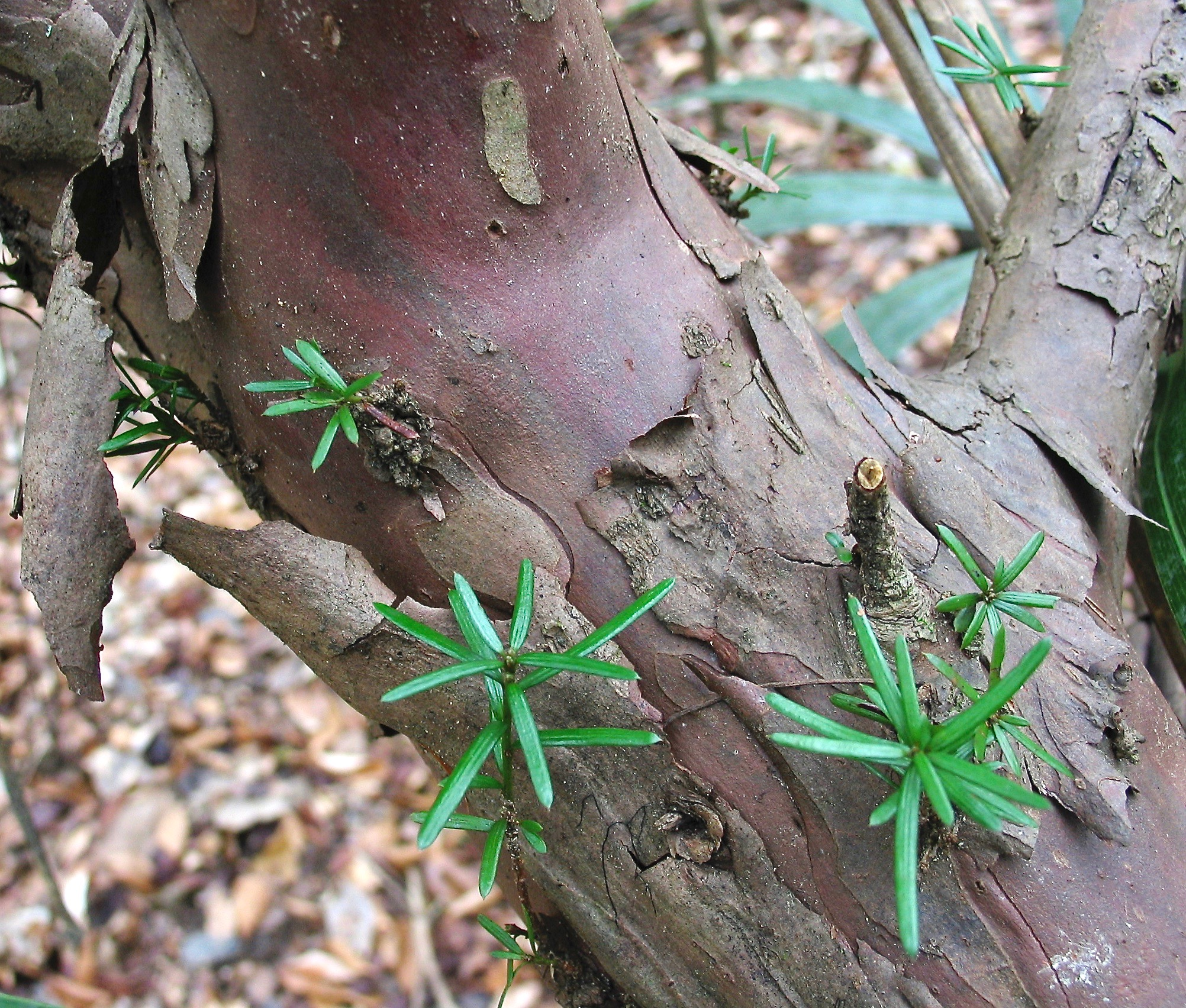
Florida yew in Torreya State Park, Florida (2004). Left is a tall, leaning specimen. Right is closeup of its stem.

Taxus floridana, like other species of yew, has orthodox seeds. Its seeds can therefore be dried and frozen for long periods of time without losing viability. In fact, stored seeds of any yew species can "take years to break dormancy".

A full list current to 2018 of Taxus floridana in living collections outside of historically native range was aggregated and posted on the Torreya Guardians website. In addition to botanic gardens, this list includes three citizens who have planted this glacial relict for the purpose of assisted migration experimentation in northward states.

Although this species was previously listed in the Florida endangered species program, it no longer has legal protection under the U.S. or state endangered species programs. However, the bulk of its very limited historically native range is in protective status at Torreya State Park and the adjacent Nature Conservancy's Apalachicola Bluffs and Ravines Preserve.
