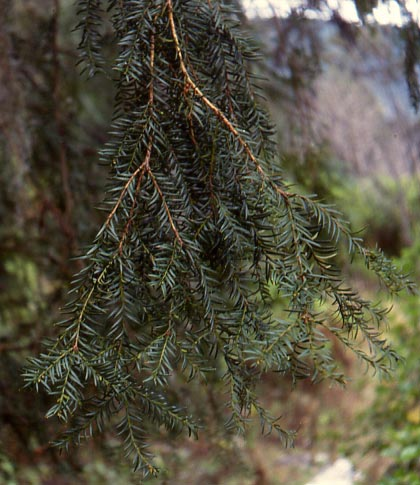

Conservation status
- Endangered (IUCN 3.1)

Scientific classification
- Kingdom: Plantae
- Clade: Tracheophytes
- Clade: Gymnospermae
- Division: Pinophyta
- Class: Pinopsida
- Order: Cupressales
- Family: Taxaceae
- Genus: Taxus
- Species: T. globosa

Binomial name
- Taxus globosa Schltdl.

= Taxus globosa =

Species of conifer

Taxus globosa, the Mexican yew, is an evergreen shrub and one of the eight species of yew. The Mexican yew is a rare species, only known to be found in a small number of locations in eastern Mexico, Guatemala, El Salvador and Honduras, and is listed as an endangered species. The Mexican yew is a shrub that grows to an average height of 4.6m. It has large, sharp light green needles growing in ranks on either side of its branches.

There are several projects in order to produce Paclitaxel (an anti-tumor agent) around the world, but Mexican yew has not been as well studied because its low production of Taxol (Bringi et al., 1995) by in vitro plant cell cultures. Few researchers focus their work on this species, the team leader on Taxus globosa S. is perhaps that of Barradas at Veracruz Institute of Technology (Instituto Tecnológico de Veracruz).
