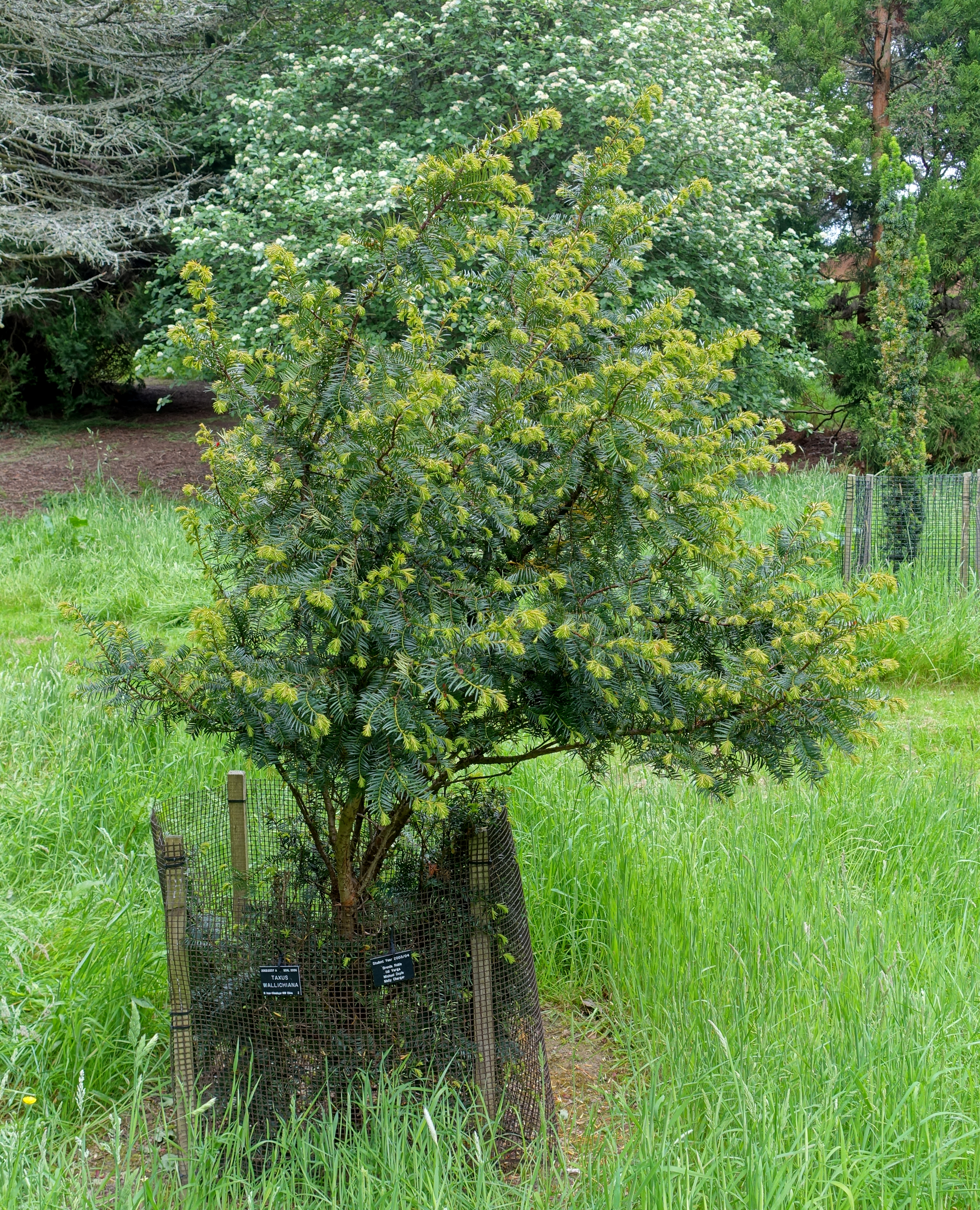

Conservation status
- Endangered (IUCN 3.1)
- CITES Appendix II

Scientific classification
- Kingdom: Plantae
- Clade: Tracheophytes
- Clade: Gymnosperms
- Division: Pinophyta
- Class: Pinopsida
- Order: Cupressales
- Family: Taxaceae
- Genus: Taxus
- Species: T. wallichiana

Binomial name
- Taxus wallichiana Zucc.

Synonyms
- List: Taxus baccata subsp. wallichiana; Taxus celebica (Warb.) H.L.Li; Taxus chinensis var. yunnanensis (W.C.Cheng & L.K.Fu) L.K.Fu; Taxus contorta var. mucronata Spjut; Taxus nucifera Wall.; Taxus obscura Spjut; Taxus orientalis Bertol.; Taxus phytonii Spjut; Taxus suffnesii Spjut; Taxus sumatrana (Miq.) de Laub.; Taxus yunnanensis W.C.Cheng & L.K.Fu

= Taxus wallichiana =

Species of conifer

Taxus wallichiana, the Himalayan yew, is a species of yew, native to the Himalaya and parts of south-east Asia. The species has a variety of uses in traditional medicine. It is currently classified as endangered by the IUCN.

== Distribution and habitat ==
The species favours a reasonably wide range of habitats, growing in montane, temperate, warm temperate, and tropical submontane to high montane forests which may be deciduous, evergreen, or of mixed character. In forests, it tends to present as a low canopy tree; in open situations it usually forms a large, broadly spreading shrub. Elevation ranges from 900 to 3,700 m (3,000 to 12,100 ft).

== Growth ==
It is a medium-sized evergreen coniferous tree growing to 10 m (33 ft) tall, similar to Taxus baccata and sometimes treated as a subspecies of it. The shoots are green at first, becoming brown after three or four years. The leaves are thin, flat, slightly falcate (sickle-shaped), 1.5–2.7 cm long and 2 mm broad, with a softly mucronate apex; they are arranged spirally on the shoots but twisted at the base to appear in two horizontal ranks on all except for erect lead shoots. It is dioecious, with the male and female cones on separate plants; the seed cone is highly modified, berry-like, with a single scale developing into a soft, juicy red aril 1 cm diameter, containing a single dark brown seed 7 mm long. The pollen cones are globose, 4 mm diameter, produced on the undersides of the shoots in early spring.

== Species ==
Similar plants occurring further east through China to Taiwan, Vietnam and the Philippines are included in Taxus wallichiana as T. wallichiana var. chinensis (Pilger) Florin by some authors, but are more often treated as a separate species Taxus chinensis.

== Medicinal uses ==
The tree has medicinal use in Ayurveda and Tibetan medicine. Taxus wallichiana is also a source of the chemical precursors to the anticancer drug paclitaxel (taxol). Taxus wallichiana is used for making tea by the Bhotiya tribal community in the Garhwal Himalaya. The stem bark of this species, which is locally known as thuner, is collected for this purpose. This species is also used as fuelwood by the local communities. In Himachal it is known to be medicine for some types of cancer. A high-quality phased genome of T. wallichiana has been sequenced, and collinearity analysis between it and other closely related species to gymnosperms has helped provide evidence explaining why Taxus species are the only plants providing a large-scale source of paclitaxel. Helping identify and annotate several CYP450 genes involved in the paclitaxel biosynthetic pathway.

== Conservation ==
The Himalayan yew has been subject to heavy exploitation for its leaves and bark across most of its range through the Himalayas and western China. Declines have been particularly heavy in India and Nepal, with losses of up to 90% having been reported. The degree of exploitation in other locations in its range is less well known, but is also assumed to be serious. The species is currently classified as endangered by the IUCN. It is present in several protected areas, and at least some conservation and propagation measures are underway, with an eye to its commercial value in the medicine trade.
