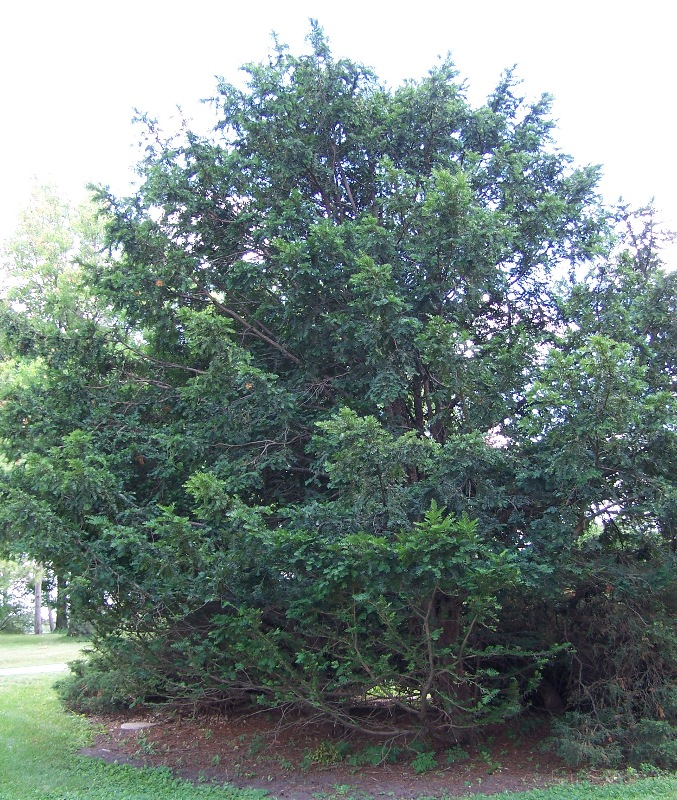
- Morton Arboretum Acc. 1378-56-2

Conservation status
- Endangered (IUCN 3.1)
- CITES Appendix II

Scientific classification
- Kingdom: Plantae
- Clade: Tracheophytes
- Clade: Gymnosperms
- Division: Pinophyta
- Class: Pinopsida
- Order: Cupressales
- Family: Taxaceae
- Genus: Taxus
- Species: T. chinensis

Binomial name
- Taxus chinensis (Rehder & E.H.Wilson) Rehder

Subspecies
- Taxus chinensis var. mairei

= Taxus chinensis =

Species of conifer

Taxus chinensis is a species of yew. It is commonly called the Chinese yew, though this term also refers to Taxus celebica or Taxus sumatrana.

The species was first described by Alfred Rehder in 1919 in the Journal of the Arnold Arboretum. Before that, the tree was considered a variety of Taxus baccata, T. baccata var. sinensis.

This plant is used to produce medicines for cancer treatment, including Paclitaxel and Taxifolin (found in Taxus chinensis var. mairei). It can also be used in many other ways and is protected in various ways under Chinese and international law. This protection is in place due to the species' importance to cancer treatment, and its susceptibility to anthropomorphic disturbance. Currently, the species is suffering the consequences of its economic and scientific exploitation for the production of the aforementioned anticancer drugs.

== Sources ==
- Elwes, Henry John; Henry, Augustine (1906–1913). The Trees of Great Britain & Ireland. Edinburgh: private print.; in 7 volumes; with separate parts for plates;
  vol 1: Elwes, Henry John; Henry, Augustine (1906). The Trees of Great Britain and Ireland. Vol. 1. Edinburgh: private print.
- Rehder, Alfred (1919). "New Species, Varieties and Combinations from the Herbarium and the Collections of the Arnold Arboretum—Taxaceae". Journal of the Arnold Arboretum. 1: 44–60. doi:10.5962/p.185141.
