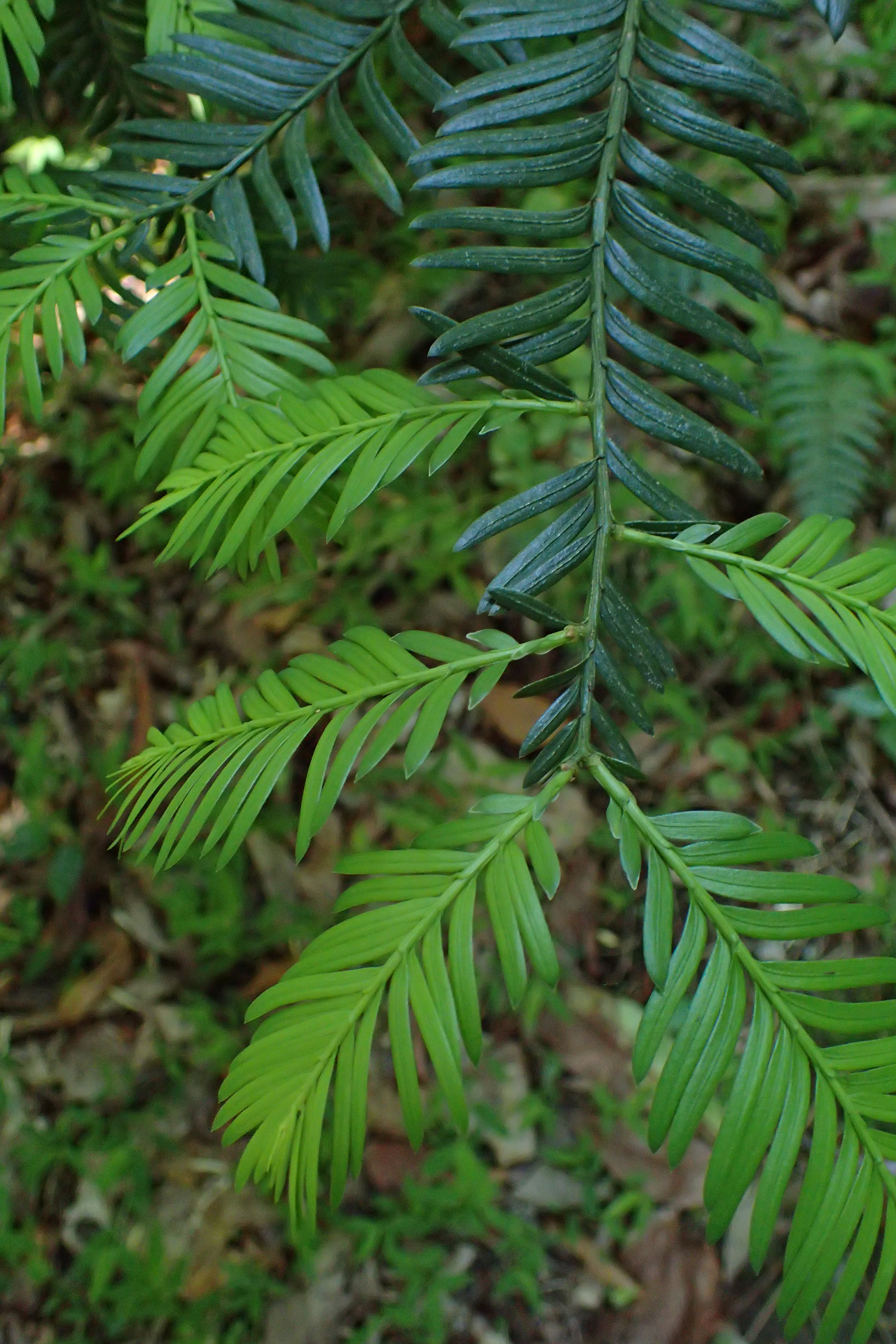
- Leaves
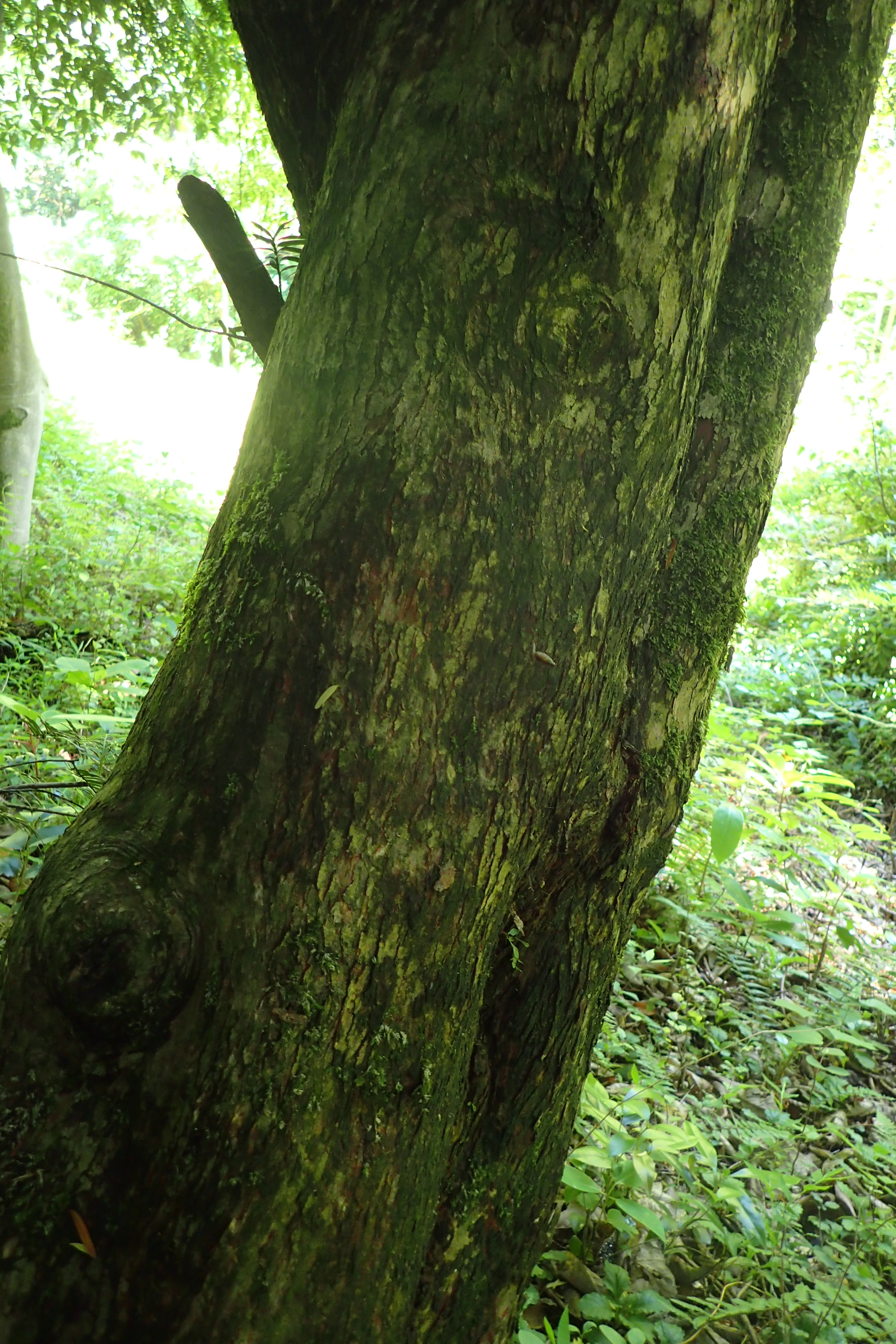
- Trunk

Conservation status
- Vulnerable (IUCN 3.1)

Scientific classification
- Kingdom: Plantae
- Clade: Embryophytes
- Clade: Tracheophytes
- Clade: Spermatophytes
- Clade: Gymnosperms
- Division: Pinophyta
- Class: Pinopsida
- Order: Cupressales
- Family: Taxaceae
- Genus: Taxus
- Species: T. mairei

Binomial name
- Taxus mairei (Lemée & H.Lév.) S.Y.Hu

Synonyms
- List: Taxus kingstonii Spjut; Taxus mairei var. speciosa (Florin) Spjut; Taxus speciosa Florin; Taxus sumatrana subsp. mairei (Lemée & H.Lév.) Silba; Taxus wallichiana var. mairei (Lemée & H.Lév.) L.K.Fu & Nan Li; Tsuga mairei Lemée & H.Lév.

= Taxus mairei =

Species of plant

Taxus mairei, Maire's yew, is a species of conifer in the yew family Taxaceae, native to Nepal, Assam, central and southern China, Hainan, Taiwan and Vietnam. It is extensively harvested for its paclitaxel (taxol) content in China.
