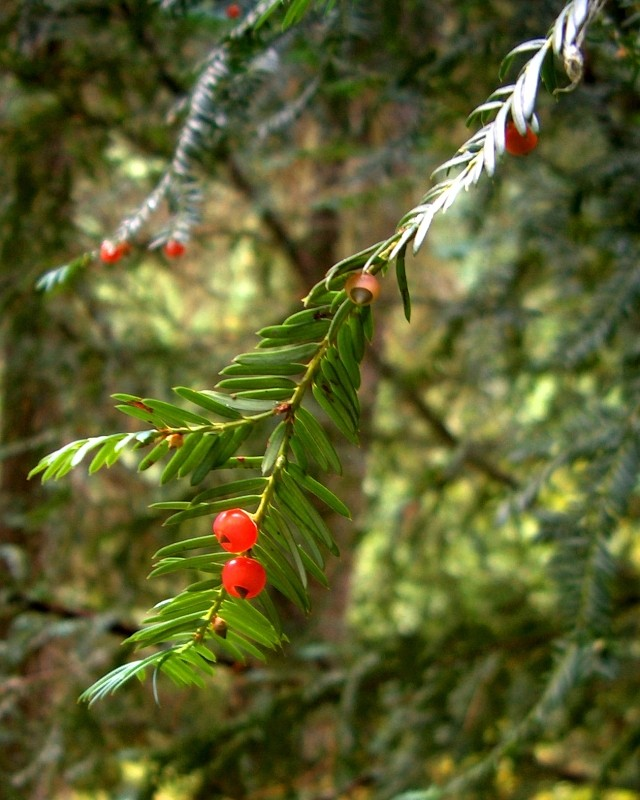
- Taxus brevifolia (Pacific yew) foliage and fruit

Conservation status
- Near Threatened (IUCN 3.1)

Scientific classification
- Kingdom: Plantae
- Clade: Tracheophytes
- Clade: Gymnosperms
- Division: Pinophyta
- Class: Pinopsida
- Order: Cupressales
- Family: Taxaceae
- Genus: Taxus
- Species: T. brevifolia

Binomial name
- Taxus brevifolia Nutt.
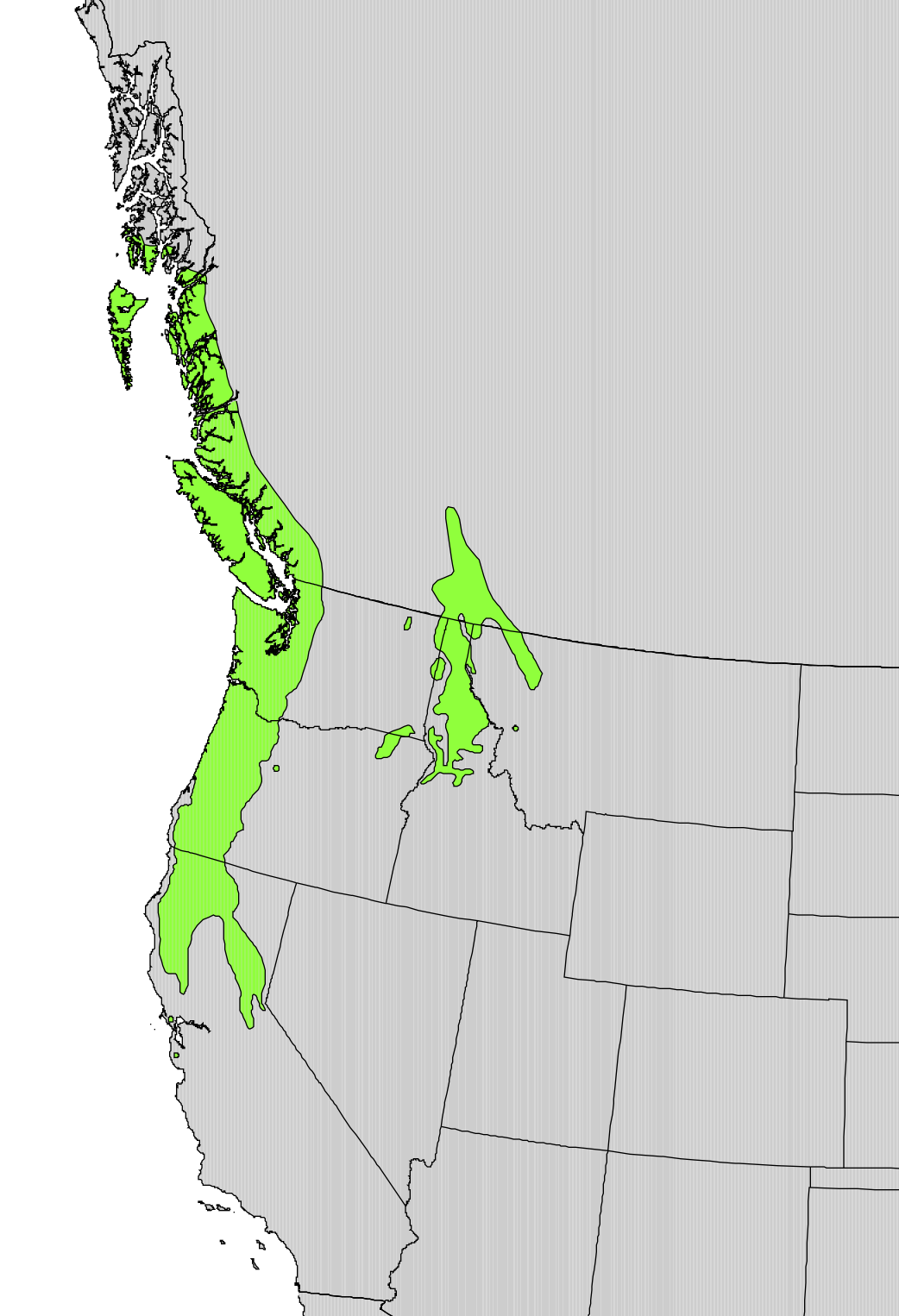
- Natural range

Synonyms
- Taxus baccata subsp. brevifolia (Nutt.) Pilg.; Taxus baccata var. brevifolia (Nutt.) Koehne; Taxus baccata var. canadensis Benth.; Taxus boursieri Carrière; Taxus brevifolia var. polychaeta Spjut; Taxus brevifolia subsp. polychaeta (Spjut) Silba; Taxus brevifolia var. reptaneta Spjut; Taxus brevifolia subsp. reptaneta (Spjut) Silba; Taxus lindleyana A. Murray bis; Taxus occidentalis Nutt.

= Taxus brevifolia =

Species of conifer

Taxus brevifolia, the Pacific yew or western yew, is a species of conifer in the yew family, Taxaceae, native to the Pacific Northwest of North America. It is a small tree, thriving in moisture and otherwise tending to take the form of a shrub.

== Description ==
A small conifer (sometimes appearing as a shrub), the Pacific yew grows 10–15 metres (33–49 feet) tall and with a trunk up to 50 centimetres (20 inches) in diameter, rarely more. In some instances, trees with heights in excess of 20 m (66 ft) occur in parks and other protected areas, quite often in gullies. The tree is extremely slow-growing, and has a habit of rotting from the inside, creating hollow forms. This makes it difficult and sometimes impossible to make accurate ring counts to determine a specimen's true age. Often damaged by succession of the forest, it usually ends up in a squat, multiple-leader form, able to grow new sprouts from decapitated stumps. In its shrub form, sometimes called "yew brush", it can reproduce vegetatively via layering.

It has thin, scaly bark, red then purplish-brown, covering a thin layer of off-white sap wood with a darker heartwood that varies in color from brown to a purplish hue to deep red, or even bright orange when freshly cut. The leaves are lanceolate, flat, dark green, 1–3 cm (3/8–1 3/16 in) long and 2–3 millimetres (3/32–1/8 in) broad, arranged spirally on the stem, but with the leaf bases twisted to align the leaves in two flat rows either side of the stem except on erect leading shoots where the spiral arrangement is more obvious.

The seed cones are highly modified, each cone containing a single seed 4–7 mm (3/16–1/4 in) long partly surrounded by a modified scale which develops into a soft, bright red berry-like structure called an aril, 8–15 mm (5/16–9/16 in) long and wide and open at the end. The arils are mature 6–9 months after pollination. The seeds contained in the arils are eaten by thrushes, and other birds, which disperse the hard seeds undamaged in their droppings; maturation of the arils is spread over 2–3 months, increasing the chances of successful seed dispersal. The male cones are globose, 3–6 mm (1/8–1/4 in) diameter, and shed their pollen in early spring. It is mostly dioecious, but occasional individuals can be variably monoecious, or change sex with time.

== Taxonomy ==
=== Varieties ===
==== Taxus brevifolia var. reptaneta ====
T. brevifolia var. reptaneta (thicket yew) is a shrub variety that generally occurs in the mid to upper elevation range of the typical variety, 1,000–1,220 m (3,280–4,000 ft) at its southernmost occurrence in the Klamath Mountains region, and at lower elevations further north. It is distinguished from young trees of the typical variety (var. brevifolia) by its stems initially creeping along the ground for a short distance before ascending (curving) upwards and by the branches growing off to one side of the stem, usually the upper side. The epithet reptaneta is from the Latin reptans which means 'creeping, prostrate, and rooting', which is exactly what this variety does; in rooting, it forms yew thickets; hence, the epithet reptaneta (-etum means 'collective place of growth') and hence the common name, thicket yew.

Unlike the typical variety, thicket yew grows in abundance on open sunny avalanche shoots or ravines as well as in the forest understory. It also occurs along forest margins. In northwestern Montana, a variant of the thicket yew does not ascend upwards; rather, it remains along the ground. This is probably the ancestral form; the upright form with branches along the upper side would be the expected growth pattern that might evolve from one with stems that strictly creep along the ground, since branches can only arise from the upper surface.

T. brevifolia var. reptaneta has been described as synonymous with typical yew (var. brevifolia). Though the two varieties may be genetically distinct, some botanists only use this taxon to describe different geographical ranges. For example, T. mairei var. speciosa, which occurs with the typical variety in southern China in 10 of 13 provinces, was rejected for the lack of a "geographic reason" for recognition though it appears genetically distinct. T. brevifolia var. reptaneta has also been proposed to be elevated to a subspecies, despite that rank being used to define geographically separated groups of T. baccata. (Note: Further, one recommendation strongly discourages taxonomists from "elevating a 'variety' to a 'subspecies' unless there is sufficient scientific evidence to warrant such an elevation," and that "it is crucial to provide continuity.")

==== Taxus brevifolia var. polychaeta ====
Typical T. brevifolia, like most species in the genus, usually produces a single ovule on a complex scaly shoot, composed of a primary shoot and a secondary short shoot. To the casual observer, they appear as one funnelform shoot with an ovule at the apex. T. brevifolia var. polychaeta differs from var. brevifolia in producing a relatively longer primary shoot with as many five secondary shoots. The epithet, polychaeta, is in reference to the primary shoot resembling a polychaete worm; hence, its common name 'worm cone yew'. Variety polychaeta appears to be relatively rare. It may have been extirpated from the type locality—around Mud Bay near Olympia, Washington—as a result of urban expansion. It is also known from Northern Idaho and Sonoma County, California.

As in the case with thicket yew, worm yew has been reported to be the same as the typical variety; however, there are no specific studies to support this conclusion. The authority of the thicket yew and worm cone yew has been involved in the study of Taxus for 25 years at the time the varieties were described.

=== Similar species ===
Yew foliage is very similar to that of Sequoia sempervirens, the coast redwood.

== Distribution and habitat ==
Pacific yew is native to the Pacific Northwest. It ranges from southernmost Alaska south to Northern California, mostly in the Pacific Coast Ranges, but with isolated disjunct populations in southeast British Columbia and in Northern Idaho. It grows in varying types of environments; however, in drier environments it is mostly limited to stream-side habitats, whereas in moist environments it will grow up onto slopes and ridgetops, at least as high in altitude as 1,400 metres (4,600 ft) above sea level. Pacific yew is shade tolerant, but can also grow in sun. The tree's shade tolerance allows it to form an understory, which means that it can grow along streams providing shade to maintain water temperature.

== Ecology ==
Birds eat the fruit cups and spread the seeds. Moose feed on the tree in winter in forests of the Rocky Mountains.

== Toxicity ==
Many parts of yews are poisonous and can be fatal if eaten, including the seed, which should not even be chewed. Ingestion of the Pacific yew can result in complex cardiac arrhythmia and hemodynamic instability.

== Uses ==
Traditionally, the resilient and rot-resistant wood was used by Native Americans to make tools, bows (backed with sinew), arrows, and canoe paddles. Other purposes for yew included making harpoons, fishhooks, wedges, clubs, spoons, drums, snowshoes, and arrowheads. The foliage and bark were used for medicinal purposes. Members of the Pit River Tribe would sell this plant to the Ukiah. The Concow tribe calls the tree yōl'-kō (Konkow language).

Modern-day longbow makers report that a tiny percentage of yew trees are of a grain suitable for their craft. The Japanese have used the wood for decorative purposes, and the Taiwanese have valued it as well.

The juicy red cup around the seed seems to be edible (but not the toxic seed within), with a mild cherry jello-like flavour. The berry is said to have a sweet taste but slimy texture, while the leaves, bark, and seed are extremely poisonous and should not be consumed.

The chemotherapy drug paclitaxel (taxol), used in breast, ovarian, and lung cancer treatment, was first isolated from the bark of T. brevifolia. As the tree was already becoming scarce when its chemotherapeutic potential was realized around the 1990s; the widespread use of paclitaxel was only enabled circa 2003 when a semi-synthetic pathway was developed from extracts of cultivated yews of other species.

== Gallery ==
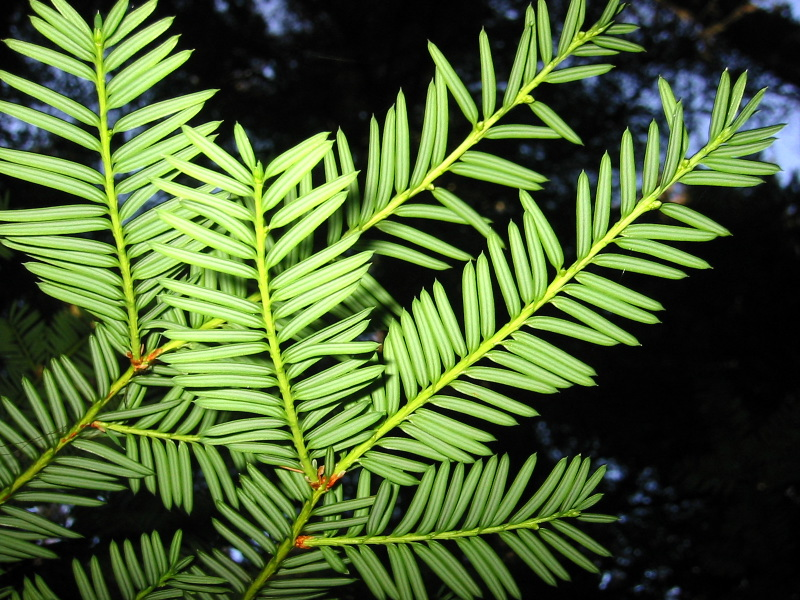
Pacific yew foliage underside

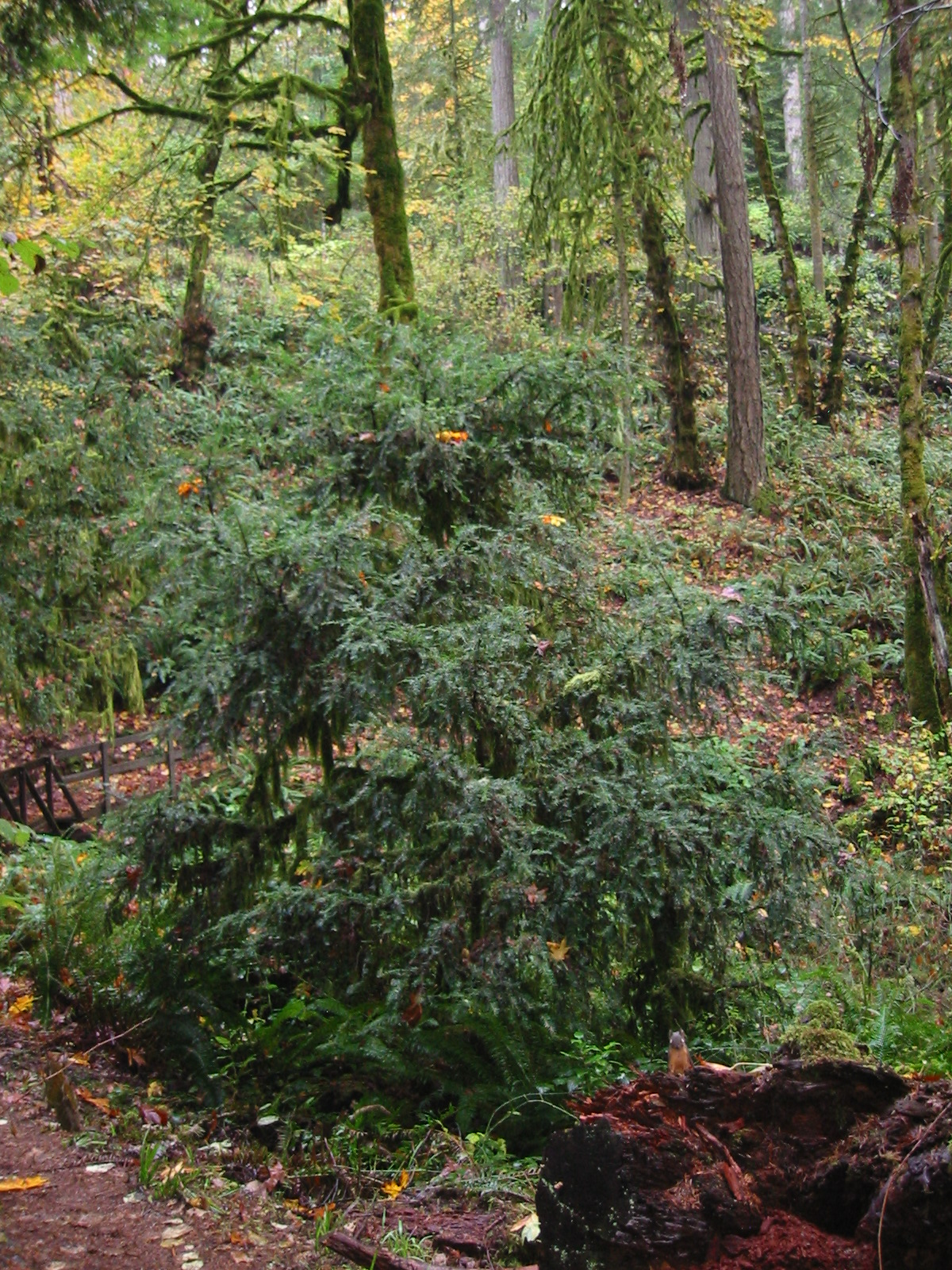
Pacific yew form

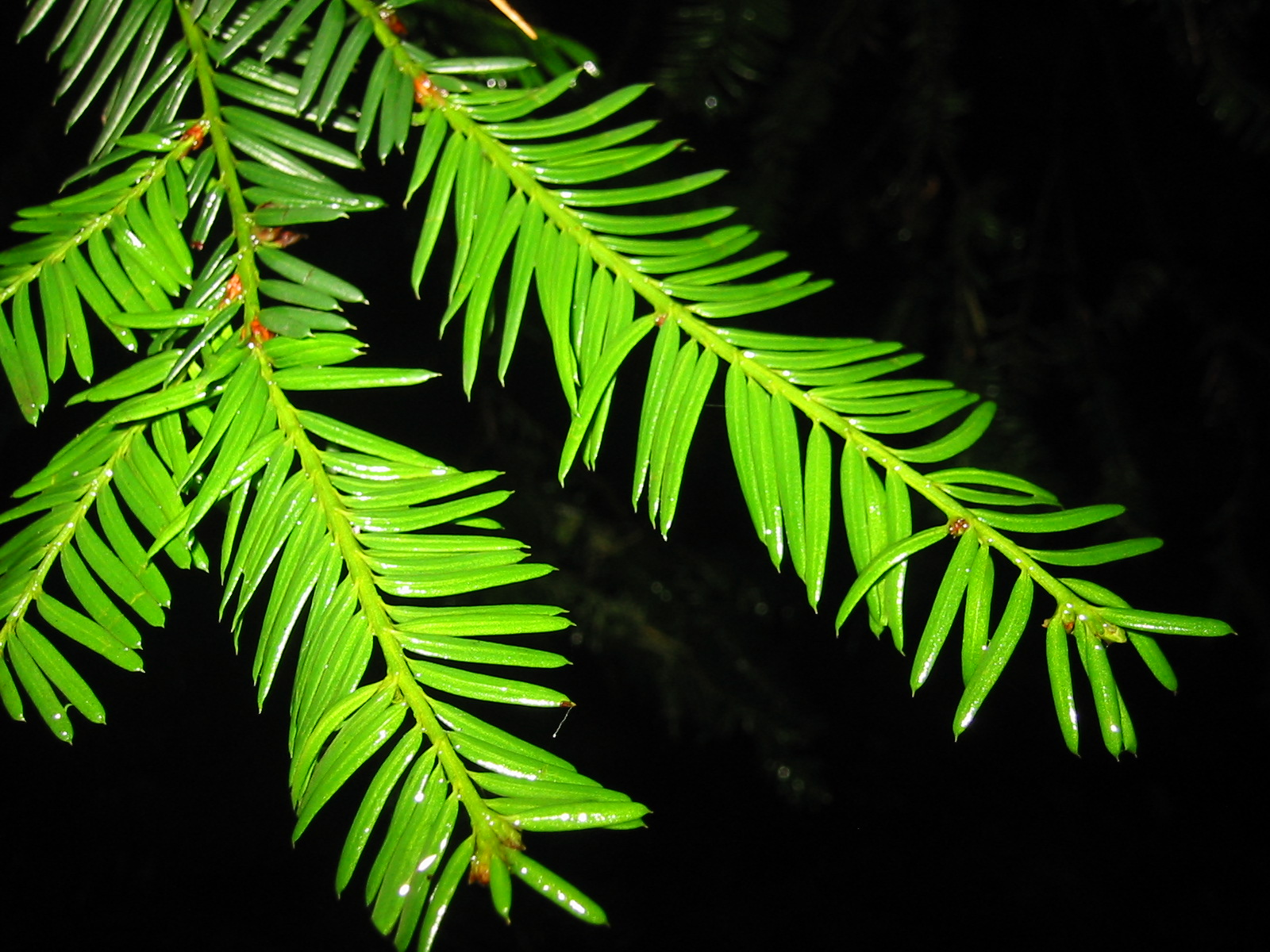
Pacific yew foliage

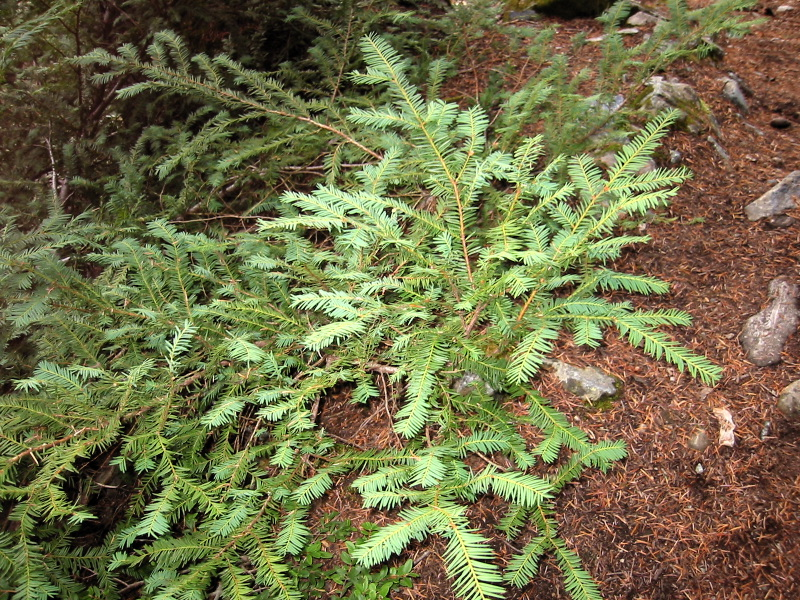
Pacific yew mat form

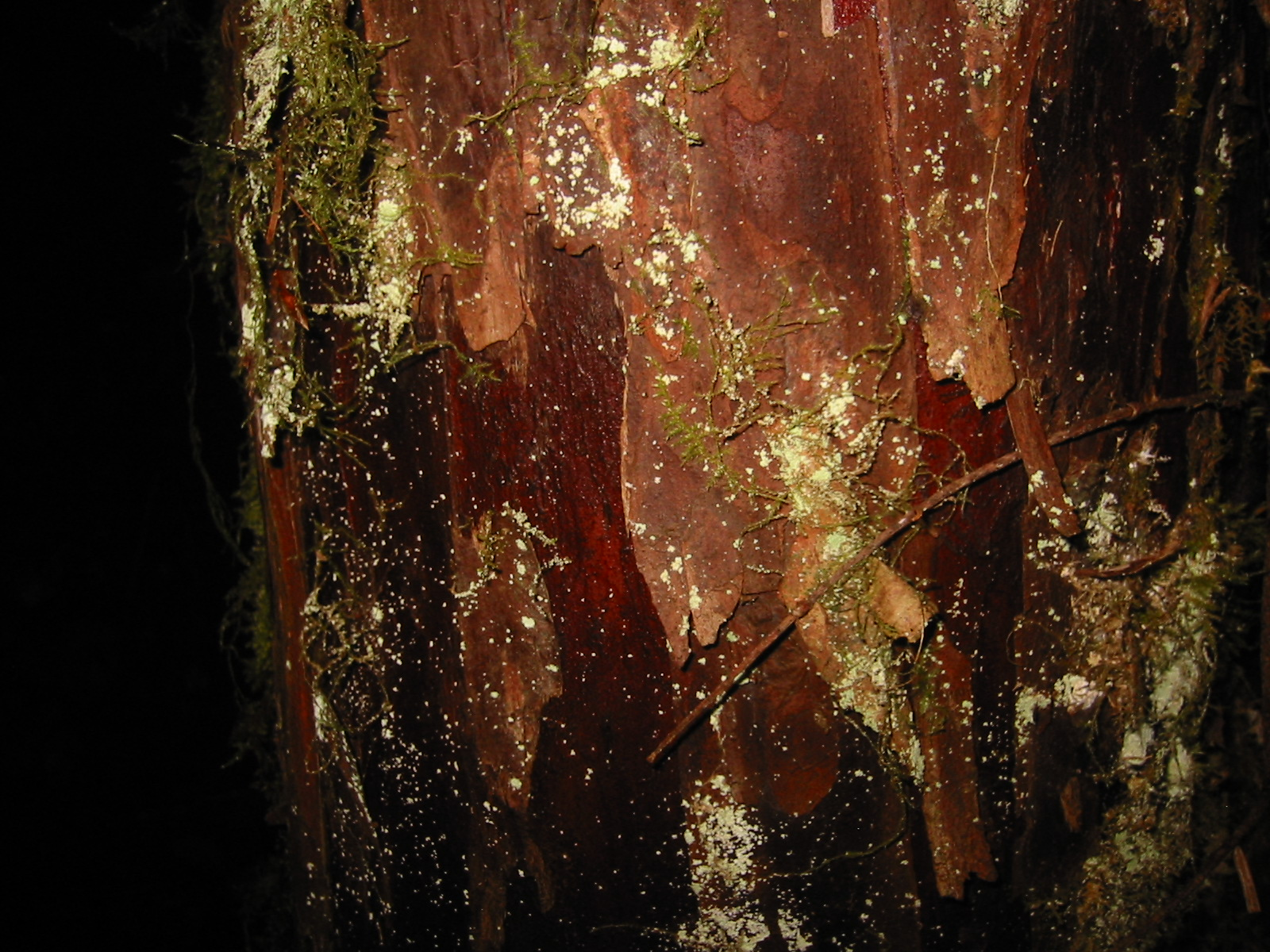
Pacific yew bark

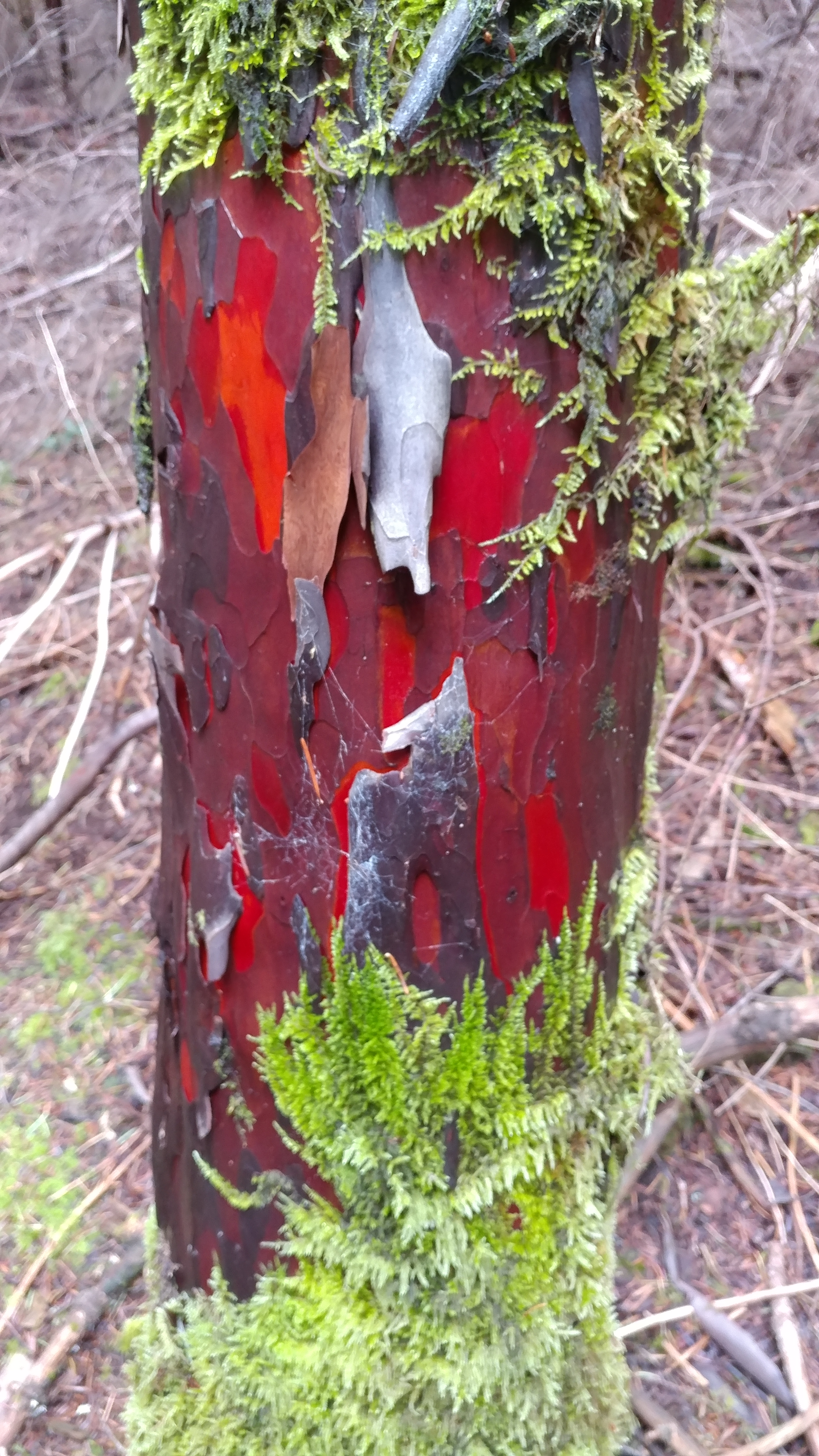
Color variations of bark on Pacific yew
