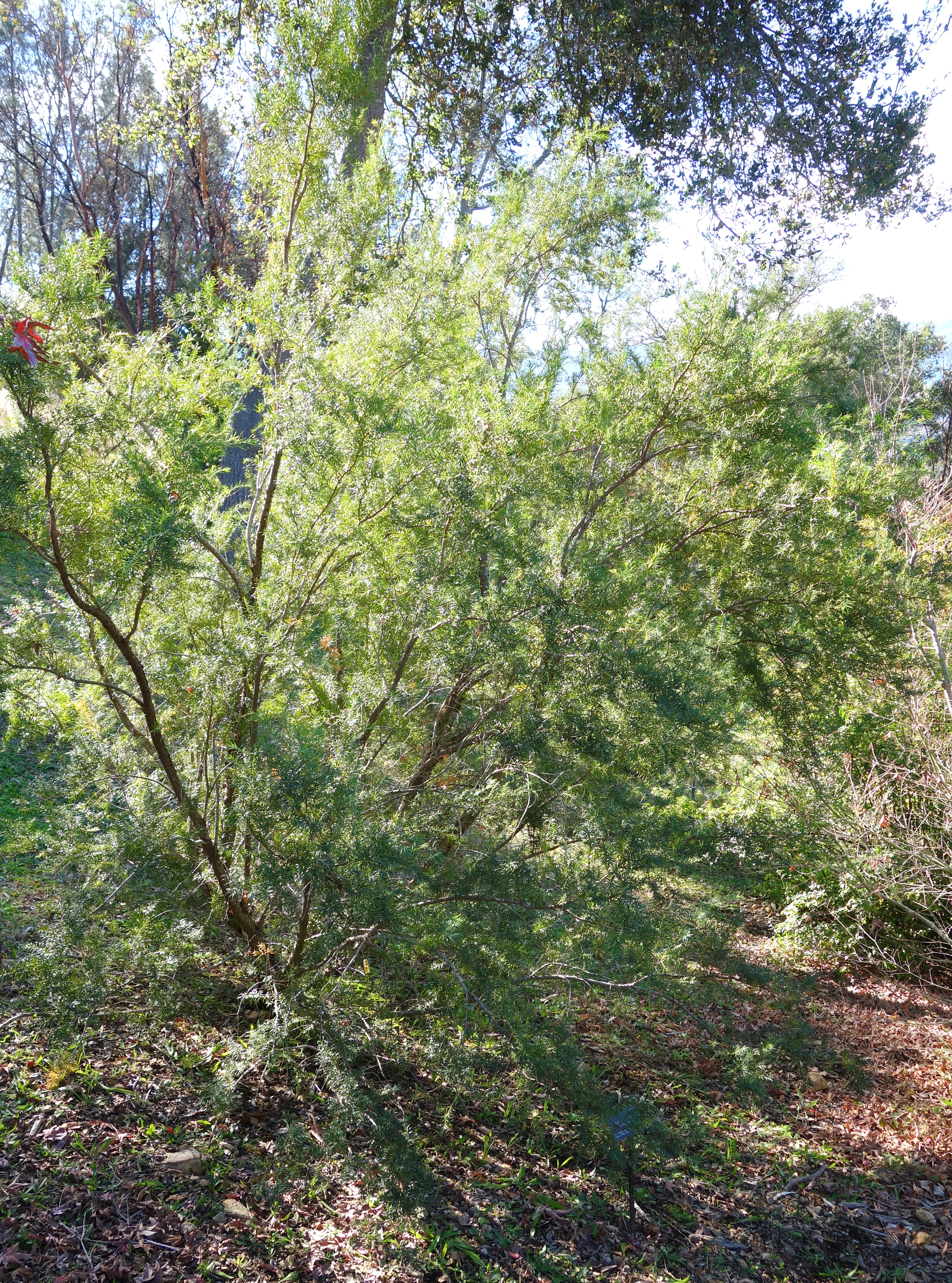
- CITES Appendix II (CITES)

Scientific classification
- Kingdom: Plantae
- Clade: Tracheophytes
- Clade: Gymnospermae
- Division: Pinophyta
- Class: Pinopsida
- Order: Cupressales
- Family: Taxaceae
- Genus: Taxus
- Species: T. sumatrana

Binomial name
- Taxus sumatrana (Miquel) de Laub.

= Taxus sumatrana =

Species of conifer

Taxus sumatrana, or the Sumatran yew, is a large evergreen shrub and one of the eight species of yew. Its taxonomic namesake is indicative of the species being found in Indonesia (specifically, the island of Sumatra); however, T. sumatrana is also found in a number of South and Southeast Asian countries, including parts of Afghanistan, Bangladesh, Bhutan, China, India, Indochina, Nepal, Pakistan, the Philippines, Taiwan, and Tibet. Given this broad geographical range, it is also known as the Taiwan yew, the Chinese yew, as well as the East Himalayan yew. Plants of the World Online recognizes T. sumatrana as a synonym of Taxus wallichiana.

T. sumatrana is typically found at elevations ranging from 400 to 3,100 m and mainly in subtropical forests or on highland ridges. It is a government-protected species in Taroko National Park in Taiwan.

== Appearance ==
Taxus sumatrana is a wide-trunked, bushy shrub that will eventually develop into a tree, attaining an average height of 14 m (approx. 45 feet). Its leaves are around 1.2–2.7 cm long and 2–2.5 mm wide (around 1”x1”), growing in two ranks along the branches and abruptly spiraling into an apex at the tip. The foliage a pale yellow-green colour on the topside, with light green underneath. Its bark is grey-red which exfoliates in irregular, 1.5 mm (half an inch) thick flakes, which leave yellowish scars on the trunk almost immediately upon cutting.

The Chinese yew has fleshy seeds that ripen into a red colour 6 mm long by 5 mm wide with flesh 4 mm thick.

== Uses ==
The wood is suitable as timber, but it grows very slow to be financially viable.

On the Indian subcontinent, the oil of T. sumatrana is traditionally used to mark a red tilaka on the foreheads of Brahmins. Chinese yews are also used for the crafting of clogs, whip handles, bed frames and bows (archery).
