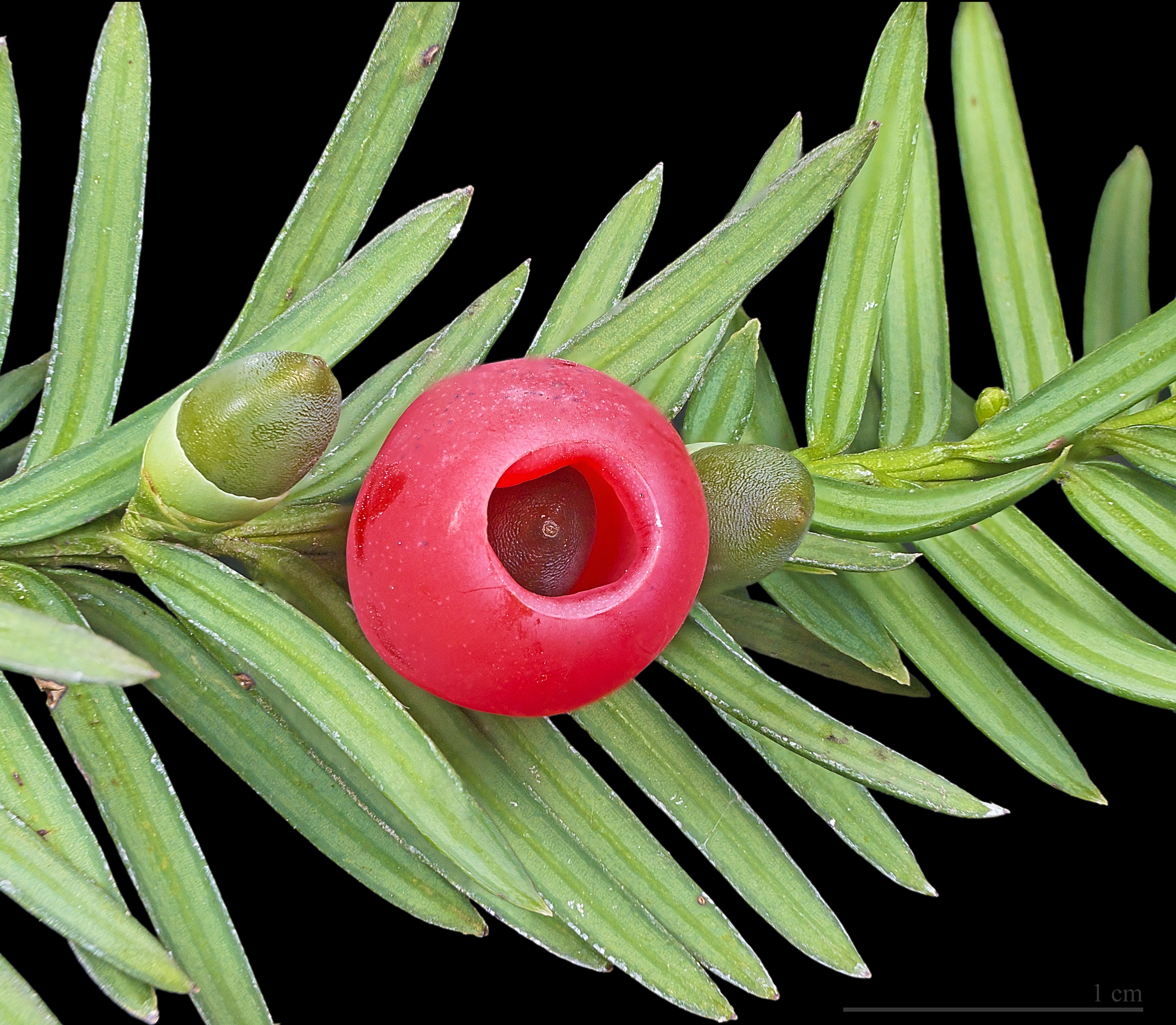
- Taxus baccata (European yew) shoot with mature and immature cones

Scientific classification
- Kingdom: Plantae
- Clade: Tracheophytes
- Clade: Gymnosperms
- Division: Pinophyta
- Class: Pinopsida
- Order: Cupressales
- Family: Taxaceae
- Genus: Taxus; L.

Type species
- Taxus baccata L.

Species
- See text

= Taxus =

Taxus Temporal range: Early Cretaceous – Recent

Genus of plants known as yews

Taxus is a genus of coniferous trees or shrubs known as yews in the family Taxaceae. Yews occur around the globe in temperate zones of the northern hemisphere, northernmost in Norway and southernmost in the South Celebes. Some populations exist in tropical highlands.

The oldest known fossil species are from the Early Cretaceous.

== Morphology ==
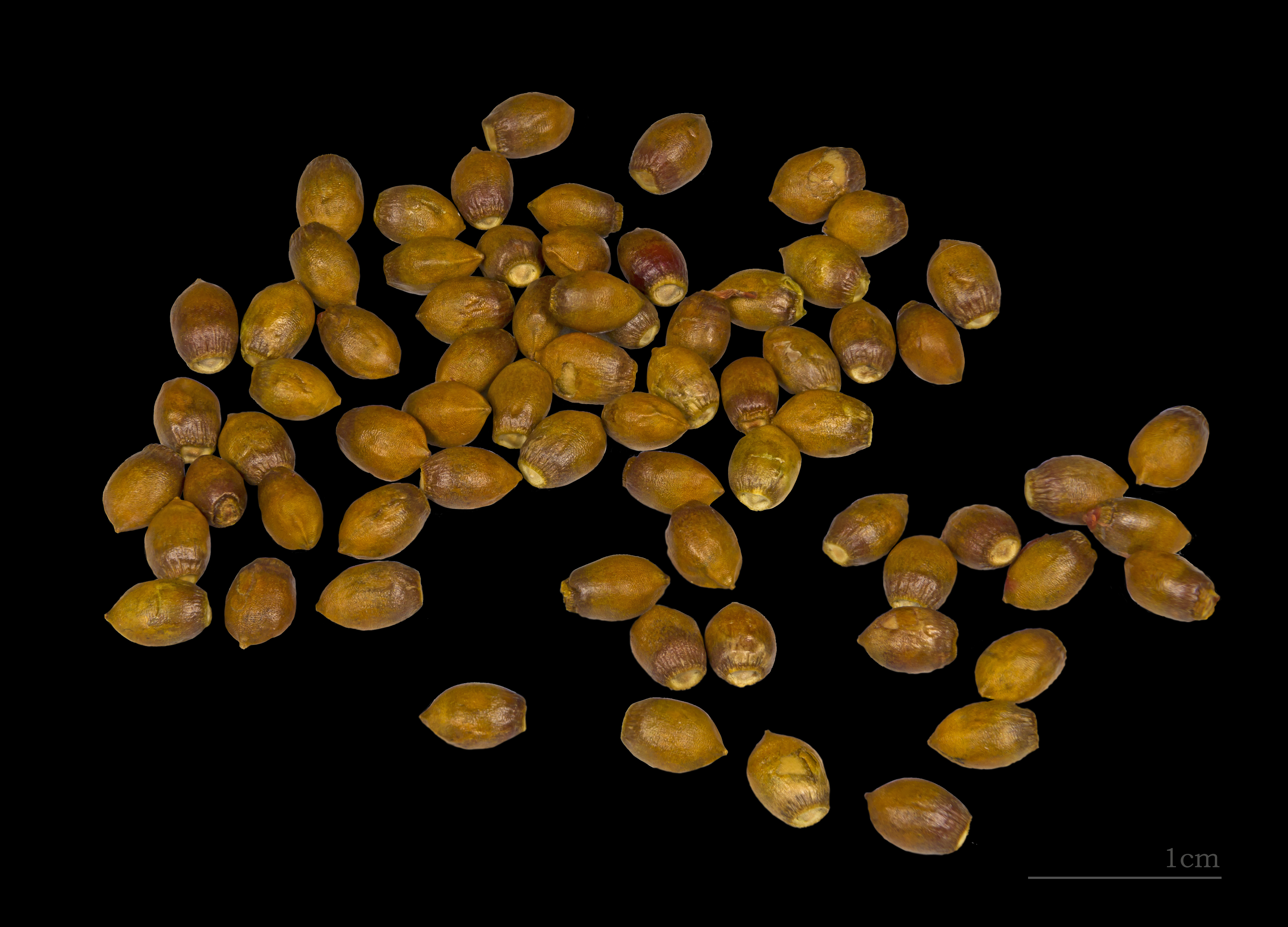
Seeds of Taxus baccata

They are relatively slow-growing and can be very long-lived, and reach heights of 2.5–20 m (8.2–65.6 ft), with trunk girth averaging 5 m (16 ft). They have reddish bark, lanceolate, flat, dark-green leaves 10–40 mm (1/2–1 1/2 in) long and 2–3 mm (3/32–1/8 in) broad, arranged spirally on the stem, but with the leaf bases twisted to align the leaves in two flat rows either side of the stem.

The male cones are globose, 3–6 mm (1/8–1/4 in) across, and shed their pollen in early spring. Yews are mostly dioecious, but occasional individuals can be variably monoecious, or change sex with time.

The seed cones are highly modified, each cone containing a single seed 4–7 mm (5/32–9/32 in) long partly surrounded by a modified scale which develops into a soft, bright red berry-like structure called an aril, 8–15 mm (5/16–19/32 in) long and wide and open at the end. The arils are mature 6–9 months after pollination, and with the seed contained are eaten by thrushes, waxwings and other birds, which disperse the hard seeds undamaged in their droppings; maturation of the arils is spread over 2–3 months, increasing the chances of successful seed dispersal.

== Taxonomy and systematics ==
Taxus is the Latin word for this tree and its wood was used to make javelins. The Latin word is probably borrowed, via Greek τόξον tóxon, from taxša, the Scythian word used for "yew" and "bow" (cognate of Persian تخش Taxš meaning bow) because the Scythians used its wood to make their bows.

All of the yews are very closely related to each other, and some botanists treat them all as subspecies or varieties of just one widespread species; under this treatment, the species name used is Taxus baccata, the first yew described scientifically.

Taxus species appear similar. Attempts at taxonomy vary from describing all yews as subspecies of T. baccata, as did RKF Pilger in 1903, to splitting species by even very small morphological differences, as did R. W. Spjut in 2007 with 25 species and over 50 varieties. Some species have traditionally been recognized by geographic distribution, but Asian species have been more difficult to classify. Taxus contorta in the Western Himalaya and Taxus sumatrana in Malesia are now generally agreed upon, but overlapping ranges in the Eastern Himalaya, China, and subtropical southeast Asia have led to greater confusion, with the species Taxus chinensis, Taxus mairei, and Taxus wallichiana being elucidated only in the 21st century with the aid of molecular phylogenetics.

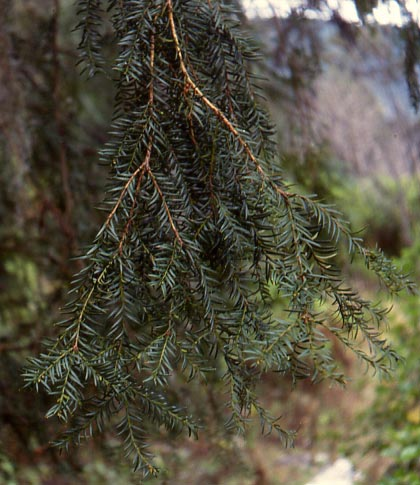
Foliage of Mexican yew

The most distinct is the Sumatran yew (T. sumatrana, native to Sumatra and Celebes north to southernmost China), distinguished by its sparse, sickle-shaped yellow-green leaves. The Mexican yew (Taxus globosa, native to eastern Mexico south to Honduras) is also relatively distinct with foliage intermediate between Sumatran yew and the other species. The Florida yew, Mexican yew and Pacific yew are all rare species listed as threatened or endangered.

=== Distribution ===
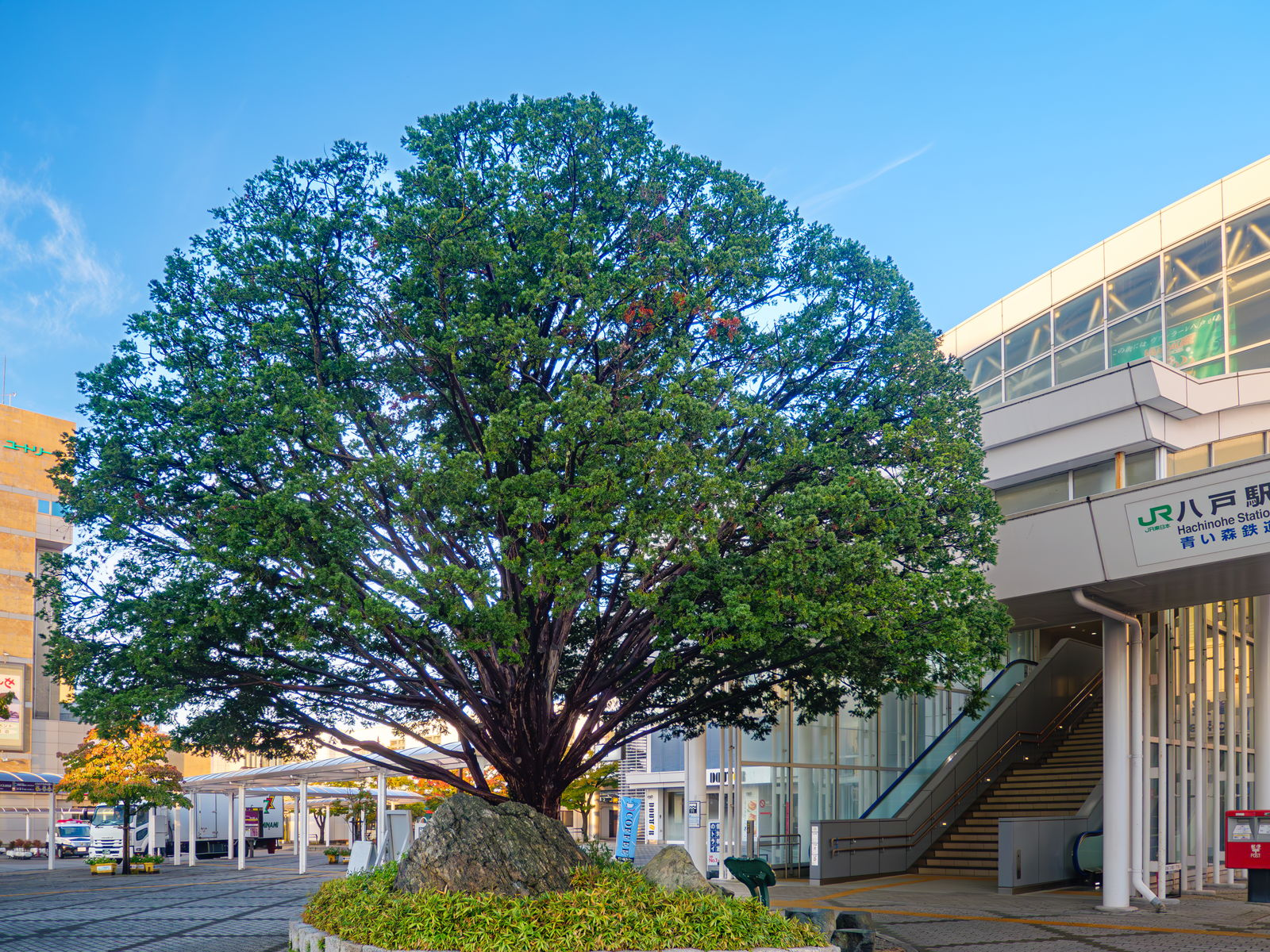
Japanese yew outside Hachinohe Station

Yews typically occur in the understory or canopy of moist temperate or tropical mountain forests. Elevation varies by latitude from 3,000 m (9,800 ft) in tropical forests to near sea level in its northernmost populations. Yews are common in landscape architecture, giving rise to widespread naturalized populations in the United States. There, both T. baccata and Taxus cuspidata are common ornamental shrubs.

T. baccata appears throughout Europe and into western Asia. T. cuspidata occurs over much of East Asia, in China, Japan, Korea, and Sakhalin. Taxus brevifolia ranges in the United States from California to Montana and Alaska, while Taxus canadensis appears in the northeastern United States and southeast Canada.

=== Species and hybrids ===
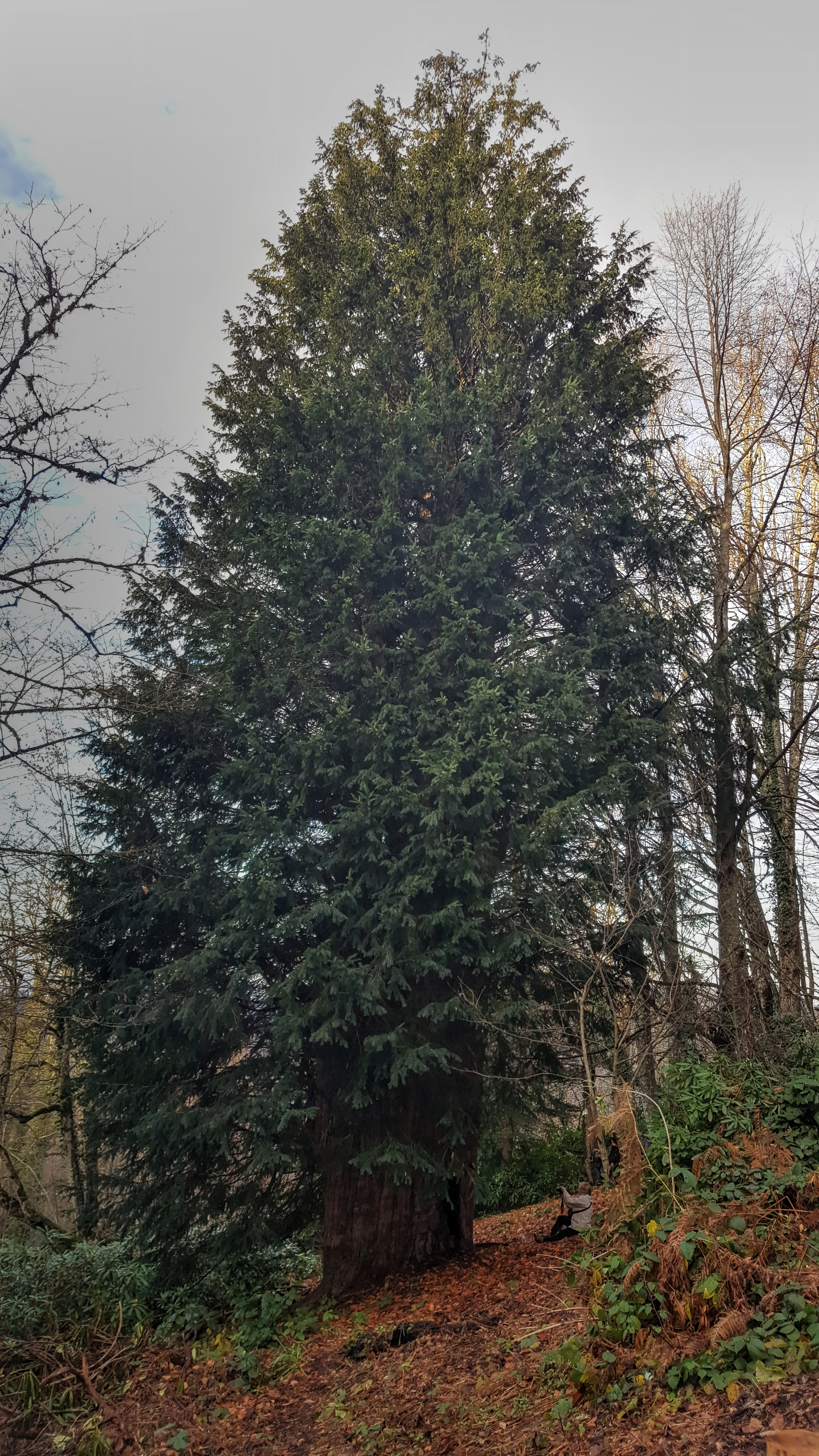
4112 year old Taxus in Anatolia

Plants of the World Online recognizes 12 confirmed species:

- Taxus baccata L., European yew
- Taxus brevifolia Nutt., Pacific yew, western yew
- Taxus calcicola L.M.Gao & Mich.Möller, Asian limestone yew
- Taxus canadensis Marshall, Canada yew
- Taxus chinensis (Pilg.) Rehder, China yew
- Taxus contorta Griff., West Himalayan yew
- Taxus cuspidata Siebold & Zucc., Rigid branch yew, Japanese yew
- Taxus floridana Nutt. ex Chapm., Florida yew
- Taxus florinii Spjut, Florin yew
- Taxus globosa Schltdl., Mesoamerican yew
- Taxus mairei (Lemée & H.Lév.) S.Y.Hu, Maire yew
- Taxus wallichiana Zucc., Wallich yew, East Himalayan yew

Fossil (extinct) species

- †Taxus engelhardtii – Oligocene, Bohemia, twig-leaves, similar to T. mairei
- †Taxus inopinata – Upper Miocene, leaf, similar to T. baccata
- †Taxus masonii – Eocene Clarno Formation; Oregon, USA
- †Taxus schornii – Miocene, northern Idaho

Commonly reported hybrids

- Taxus × media = Taxus baccata × Taxus cuspidata
- Taxus × hunnewelliana = Taxus cuspidata × Taxus canadensis

=== Phylogeny ===
Below are cladograms showing the evolutionary relationships between yew species and their global distribution.

Möller et al., 2020

- Austrotaxus
- - Pseudotaxus
  - Taxus
    - T. brevifolia
    - - North America
        - T. globosa
        - T. floridana
      - - - - T. canadensis
            - T. cuspidata
          - North Eurasia
            - T. contorta
            - T. baccata
        - South Eurasia
          - T. wallichiana
          - - - T. Huangshan type
              - T. chinensis
            - - T. phytonii
              - - T. calcicola
                - T. mairei

Stull et al., 2021

- Taxus
  - T. brevifolia
  - - - T. floridana
      - T. globosa
    - - T. wallichiana
      - - - - T. chinensis
            - T. florinii
          - - T. calcicola
            - - T. phytonii
              - T. sumatrana
        - - - T. canadensis
            - T. cuspidata
          - - T. baccata
            - - T. mairei
              - - T. contorta
                - T. fuana

== Toxicity ==
All species of yew contain highly poisonous taxine alkaloids, with some variation in the exact formula of the alkaloid between the species. All parts of the tree except the arils contain the alkaloid. The arils are edible and sweet, but the seed is dangerously poisonous; unlike birds, the human stomach can break down the seed coat and release the toxins into the body. This can have fatal results if yew 'berries' are eaten without removing the seeds first. Grazing animals, particularly cattle and horses, are also sometimes found dead near yew trees after eating the leaves, though deer are able to break down the poisons and will eat yew foliage freely. In the wild, deer browsing of yews is often so extensive that wild yew trees are commonly restricted to cliffs and other steep slopes inaccessible to deer. The foliage is also eaten by the larvae of some Lepidopteran insects including the moth willow beauty.

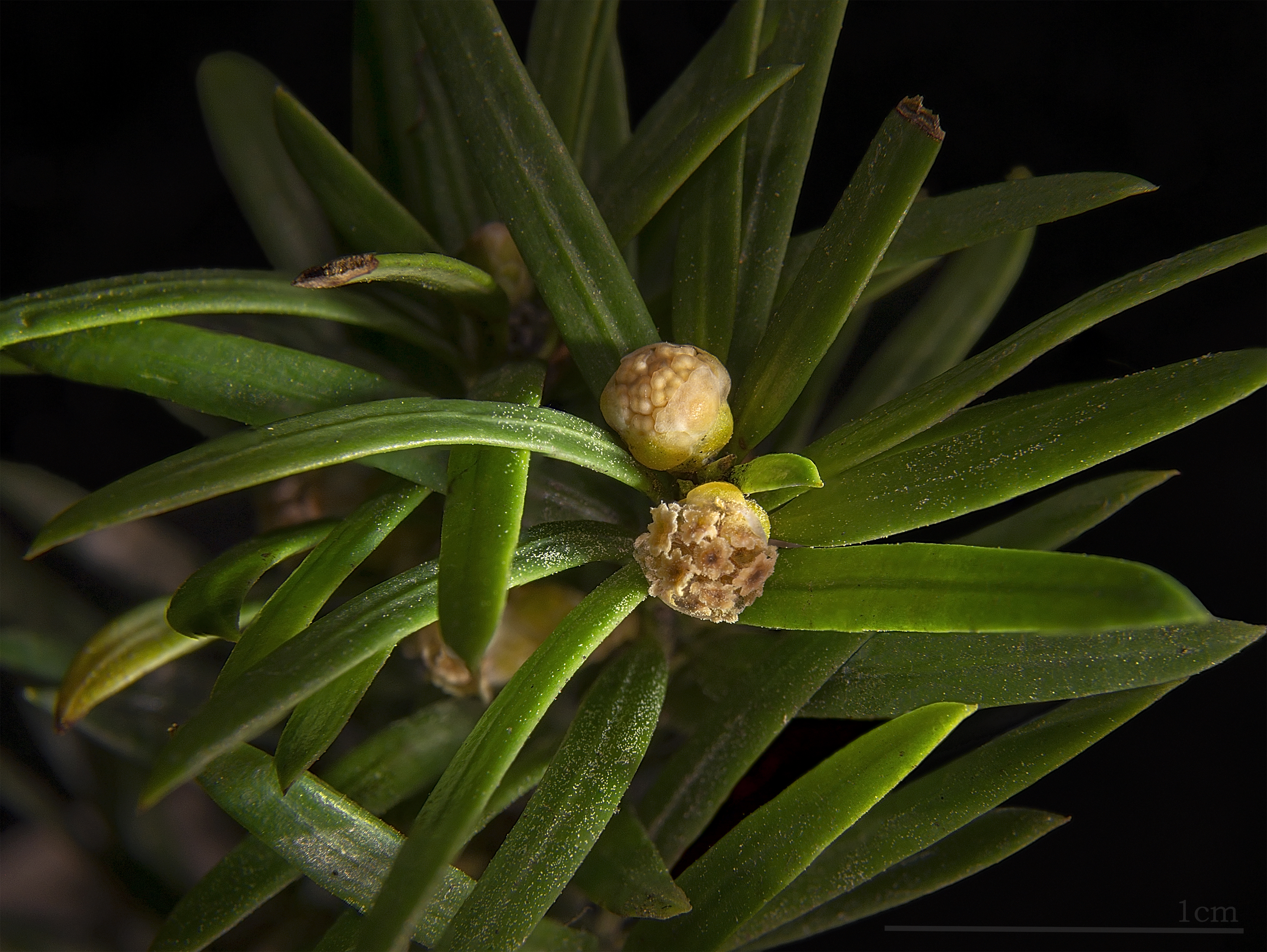
Male (pollen-producing) cones of Taxus baccata

=== Allergenic potential ===
All parts of a yew plant are toxic to humans with the exception of the yew berries (which however contain a toxic seed); additionally, male and dioecious yews in this genus release cytotoxic pollen, which can cause headaches, lethargy, aching joints, itching, and skin rashes; it is also a trigger for asthma. These pollen granules are extremely small, and can easily pass through window screens. Male yews bloom and release abundant amounts of pollen in the spring; completely female yews only trap pollen while producing none.

Yews in this genus are primarily separate-sexed, and males are extremely allergenic, with an OPALS allergy scale rating of 10 out of 10. Completely female yews have an OPALS rating of 1, and are considered "allergy-fighting".

== Uses and traditions ==
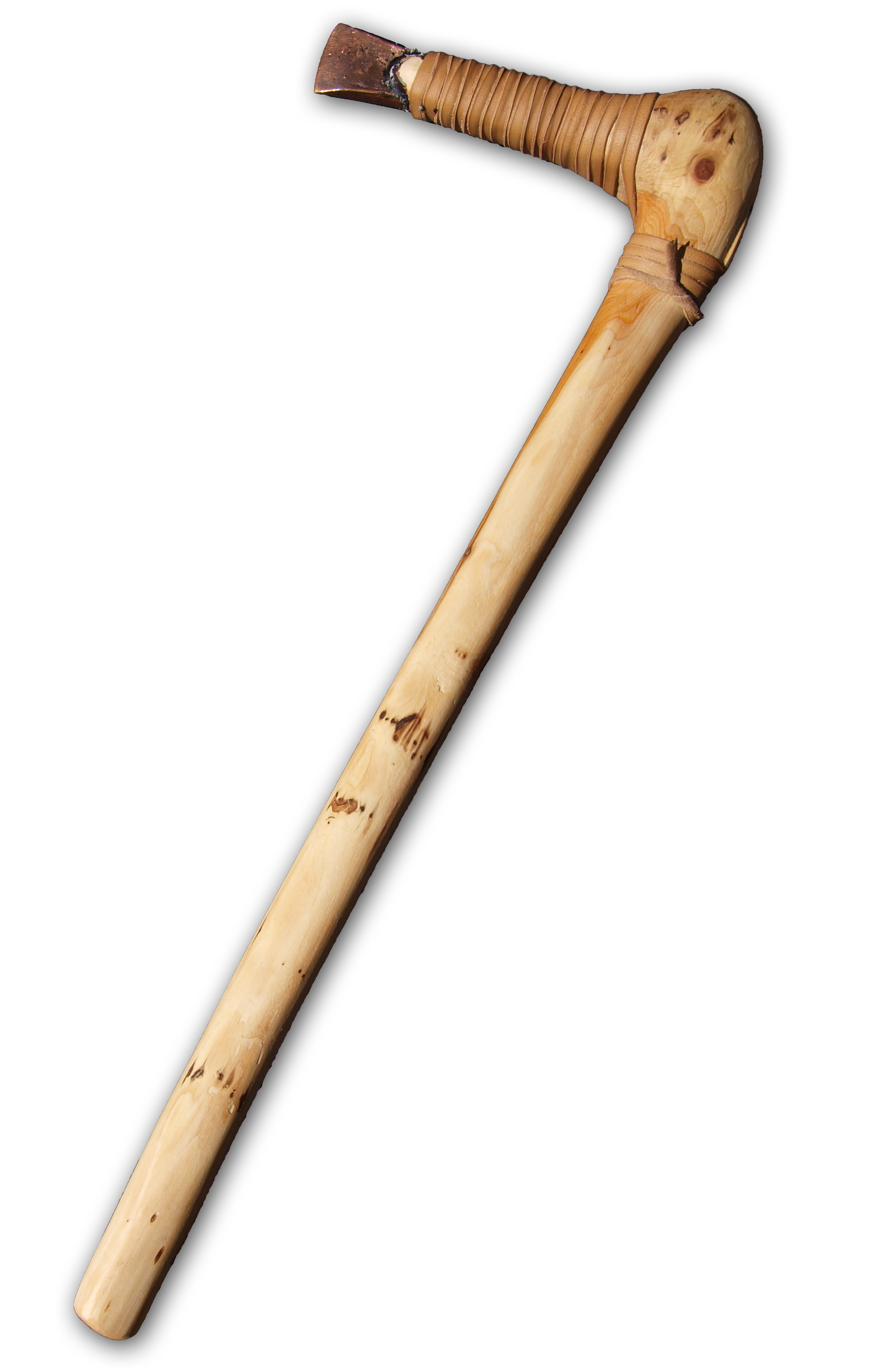
A replica of Ötzi's yew and copper axe

=== Bows ===
Yew wood is reddish brown (with whiter sapwood), and is very springy. It was traditionally used to make bows, especially the longbow. These longbows were used by Scythian people who were part of the police force in ancient Athens. This use was lent into the Ancient Greek word for "bow" and later probably borrowed into the Latin word and now generic name of Taxus.

Ötzi, the Chalcolithic mummy found in 1991 in the Italian Alps, carried an unfinished bow made of yew wood. Consequently, it is not surprising that in Norse mythology, the abode of the god of the bow, Ullr, had the name Ydalir (Yew Dales). Most longbow wood used in northern Europe was imported from Iberia, where climatic conditions are better for growing the knot-free yew wood required. The yew longbow was the critical weapon used by the English in the defeat of the French cavalry at the Battle of Agincourt, 1415. British yews tend to be too gnarly, and thus the wood for English longbows used at the Battle of Agincourt was imported from Spain or northern Italy.

=== Cultivation ===
It is suggested that English parishes were required to grow yews and, because of the trees' toxic properties, they were grown in the only commonly enclosed area of a village – the churchyard. The yew tree can often be found in church graveyards and is symbolic of sadness. Such a representation appears in Lord Alfred Tennyson's poem "In Memoriam A.H.H." (2.61–64).

The yew can be very long-lived. The Fortingall Yew has been considered to be the oldest tree in Europe, at something over 2,000 years old. Tradition has it that Pontius Pilate slept under it while on duty before 30 AD. Claims for an older tree have been made for the Defynnog Yew in the churchyard of St Cynog's Church, Defynnog, Wales, but this view is contested. Such old trees usually consist of a circular ring of growths of yew, since their heart has long since rotted away.

The Eihwaz rune is named after the yew, and sometimes also associated with the "evergreen" world tree, Yggdrasil.

=== Horticulture ===
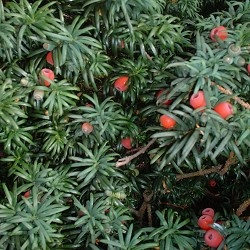
Foliage of Irish yew; note the leaves spreading all round the erect shoots

Yews are widely used in landscaping and ornamental horticulture. Over 400 cultivars of yews have been named, the vast majority of these being derived from European yew (Taxus baccata) or Japanese yew (Taxus cuspidata). The hybrid between these two species is Taxus × media. A popular fastigiate selection of the European yew (Taxus baccata 'Fastigiata') is often called the Irish yew, illustrating the difficulties with common names. A few cultivars with yellow leaves are collectively known as golden yews.

=== Chemistry ===
The Pacific yew (Taxus brevifolia), native to the Pacific Northwest of North America, and the Canada yew (Taxus canadensis) of Eastern and Central North America were the initial sources of paclitaxel or Taxol, a chemotherapeutic drug used in breast and lung cancer treatment and, more recently, in the production of the Taxus drug eluting stent by Boston Scientific. Over-harvesting of the Pacific yew for paclitaxel led to fears that it would become an endangered species, since the drug was initially extracted from the bark of the yew, the harvesting of which kills the tree. On January 18, 2008, the Botanic Gardens Conservation International (representing botanic gardens in 120 countries) stated that "400 medicinal plants are at risk of extinction, from over-collection and deforestation, threatening the discovery of future cures for disease." These included yew trees, whose bark is used for the cancer drug paclitaxel.

However, methods were developed to produce the drug semi-synthetically from the leaves of cultivated European yews. Those can be sustainably harvested without the need to further endanger wild populations, and the Pacific yew is no longer at risk. The more common Canada yew is also being successfully harvested in northern Ontario, Quebec and New Brunswick, and has become another major source of paclitaxel. Other yew species contain similar compounds with similar biochemical activity. Docetaxel, an analogue of paclitaxel, is derived from the European yew (Taxus baccata).

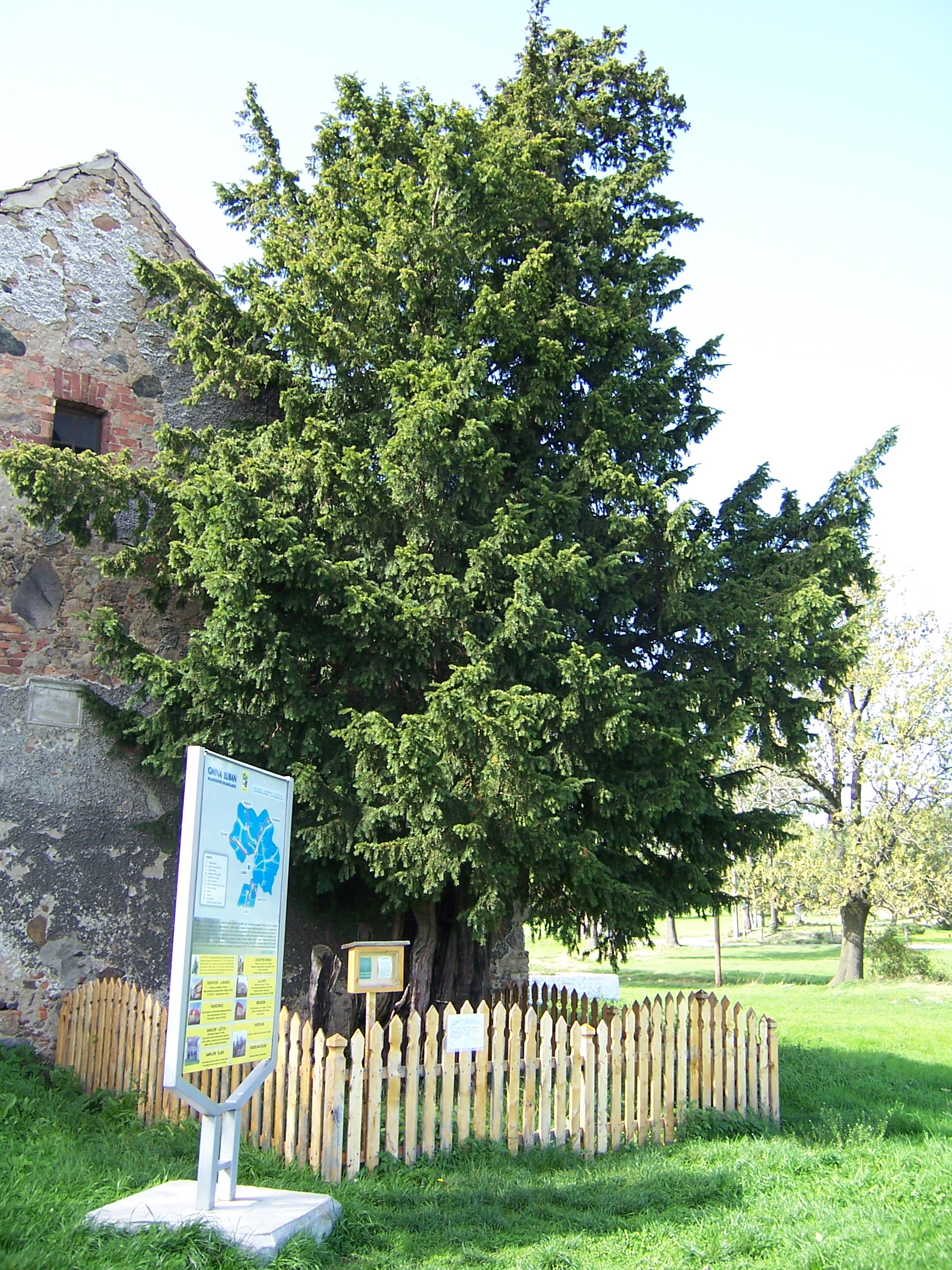
Oldest Polish specimen of European yew (1200 years)

=== In culture ===
The yew tree is a frequent symbol in the Christian poetry of T. S. Eliot, especially his Four Quartets.

The 'Yew Tree House' or 'Yew Tree Lodge' was a filming location at Shepperton Studios in London. The anthology horror film The House That Dripped Blood told stories of horror that took place in the house.
