= Flora of the United States =

Native plants of the United States

The native flora of the United States includes about 17,000 species of vascular plants, plus tens of thousands of additional species of other plants and plant-like organisms such as algae, lichens and other fungi, and mosses. About 3,800 additional non-native species of vascular plants are recorded as established outside of cultivation in the U.S., as well as a much smaller number of non-native non-vascular plants and plant relatives. The United States possesses one of the most diverse temperate floras in the world, comparable only to that of China.

Several biogeographic factors contribute to the richness and diversity of the U.S. flora. While most of the United States has a temperate climate, Alaska has vast arctic areas, the southern part of Florida is tropical, as well as Hawaii (including high mountains), and the U.S. territories in the Caribbean and the Pacific, and alpine summits are present on many western mountains, as well as a few in the Northeast. The U.S. coastline borders three oceans: The Atlantic (and Gulf of Mexico), the Arctic, and the Pacific. Finally, the U.S. shares long borders with Canada and Mexico, and is relatively close to the Bahamas, Cuba and other Caribbean islands, and easternmost Asia. There are also rainforests as well as some of the driest deserts in the world.

The native flora of the United States has provided the world with a large number of horticultural and agricultural plants, mostly ornamentals, such as flowering dogwood, redbud, mountain laurel, bald cypress, southern magnolia, and black locust, all now cultivated in temperate regions worldwide, but also various food plants such as blueberries, black raspberries, cranberries, maple syrup and sugar, and pecans, and Monterey pine and other timber trees.

Some of the native U.S. plants, such as Franklinia alatamaha, have demonstrably become extinct or extinct in the wild; others, such as Micranthemum micranthemoides, have not been seen in decades, but may still be extant. Thousands of other native U.S. vascular plants are considered rare, threatened, or endangered, either globally (rangewide) or within particular states.

== Divisions ==
According to Armen Takhtajan, Robert F. Thorne, and other geobotanists, the territory of the United States (including Hawaii and Alaska) is divided between three floristic kingdoms, six floristic regions and twelve floristic provinces, characterized by a certain degree of endemism:

Holarctic kingdom

Circumboreal crack

Arctic province
Canadian province

North American Atlantic region

Appalachian province
Atlantic and Gulf Coastal Plain province
North American Prairies province

Rocky Mountain region

Vancouverian province
Rocky Mountain province

Madrean region

Great Basin province
Californian province
Sonoran province

Neotropical kingdom

Caribbean region

West Indian province

Paleotropic kingdom

Hawaiian region

Hawaiian province

== Some prominent botanists who have studied and published on U.S. flora ==
- John Clayton (1694–1773)
- John Bartram (1699–1777)
- Carl Linnaeus (1707–1778)
- Peter Kalm (1716–1779)
- William Bartram (1739–1823)
- André Michaux (1746–1802)
- William Clark (1770–1838)
- Meriwether Lewis (1774–1809)
- Frederick Traugott Pursh (1774–1820)
- Alphonse Louis Pierre Pyramus de Candolle (1778–1841)
- Constantine Samuel Rafinesque (1783–1840)
- Thomas Nuttall (1786–1859)
- John Torrey (1796–1873)
- George Engelmann (1809–1884)
- Asa Gray (1810–1888)
- George Vasey (1822–1893)
- Sereno Watson (1826–1892)
- Charles Sprague Sargent (1841–1927)
- Edward Lee Greene (1843–1915)
- John Merle Coulter (1851–1928)
- Marcus Eugene Jones (1852–1934)
- Liberty Hyde Bailey (1858–1954)
- Nathaniel Lord Britton (1859–1934)
- Aven Nelson (1859–1952)
- Per Axel Rydberg (1860–1931)
- Alfred Rehder (1863–1949)
- Albert Spear Hitchcock (1865–1935)
- Charles Piper (1867–1926)
- Willis Lynn Jepson (1867–1946)
- John Kunkel Small (1869–1938)
- Mary Agnes Chase (1869–1963)
- Merritt Lyndon Fernald (1873–1950)
- LeRoy Abrams (1874–1956)
- Henry Allan Gleason (1882–1975)
- Paul Carpenter Standley (1884–1963)
- Edgar Theodore Wherry (1885–1982)
- Earl Edward Scherff (1886–1966)
- Emma Lucy Braun (1889–1971)
- Philip Alexander Munz (1892–1974)
- Harold St. John (1892–1991)
- Eric Hultén (1894–1981)
- Ivan Murray Johnston (1898–1960)
- Charles Leo Hitchcock (1902–1986)
- Frederick Joseph Hermann (1906–1987)
- George Ledyard Stebbins (1906–2000)
- Elbert Luther Little, Jr. (1907–2004)
- Julian Alfred Steyermark (1909–1988)
- Lyman David Benson (1909–1993)
- Reed Clark Rollins (1911–1998)
- Rupert Charles Barneby (1911–2000)
- Albert Ernest Radford (1918–2006)
- Warren Herbert Wagner (1920–2000)
- William Alfred Weber (1918–2020)
- Arthur Cronquist (1919–1992)
- Ronald Leighton McGregor (1919–2012)
- Carlyle August Luer (1922–2019)
- Robert Kral (1926–2025)
- Stanley Larson Welsh (1928–2025)
- George William Argus (1929–2012)
- Edward Groesbeck Voss (1929–2012)
- James Lauritz Reveal (1941–2015)
- Anton Alfred Reznicek (born 1950)
- Warren Lambert Wagner (born 1950)
- Barbara Jean Ertter (born 1953)
- John Thomas Kartesz
- Alan Weakley (born 1957)
