= Austroriparian =

The Austroriparian is a biogeographic province in the Southeastern United States. As designated by Miklos Udvardy, it includes the humid coniferous and mixed temperate forests of the Mississippi Alluvial Plain and the Atlantic Coastal Plain from eastern Texas to southeastern Virginia, including all but the southernmost portion of Florida, and covering portions of Alabama, Arkansas, Florida, Georgia, Louisiana, Mississippi, Missouri, North Carolina, South Carolina, Tennessee, Texas.

In the WWF designation of ecoregions, the Austroriparian province corresponds generally to the Mississippi lowland forests, Middle Atlantic coastal forests, Southeastern conifer forests, Florida Sand Pine Scrub, and the eastern portion of the Western Gulf coastal grasslands ecoregions.

The Austroriparian province corresponds to the southern portion of the Atlantic and Gulf Coastal Plain floristic province.

The name is compound of the Latin terms Austro (southern) and riparian (of the river bank).
