= North American Prairies province =

The North America Prairies is a large grassland floristic province within the North American Atlantic Region, a floristic region within the Holarctic Kingdom. It lies between the Appalachian province and the Rocky Mountains and includes the prairies of the Great Plains. It is bounded by the Canadian coniferous forests on the north and the arid semideserts to the southwest. The province itself is occupied by temperate grasslands, savannas, and shrublands (including such ecoregions as the Flint Hills tallgrass prairie, Sand Hills, High Plains). Endemism is rather limited in this province, and its boundaries are vague. During the Pleistocene much of the province was glaciated.

== Plants ==
Select plant species of the North American Prairies province include:

- Andropogon gerardi – big bluestem
- Bouteloua gracilis – blue grama
- Bouteloua dactyloides – buffalo grass
- Echinacea purpurea – purple coneflower
- Eustoma russellianum – Texas bluebell
- Lespedeza leptostachya – prairie bush-Clover
- Phlox oklahomensis – Oklahoma phlox
- Sorghastrum nutans – indiangrass
