= Great Basin Province =

The Great Basin Province may refer to:

- The Great Basin, a region of the Western United States where rivers do not flow to the sea;
- The Basin and Range Province, a geological province that overlaps with the Great Basin, characterized by alternating mountains and valleys;
- The Great Basin floristic province, a region of the Western United States defined by botanist Armen Takhtajan due to its commonality of flora;
- The Great Basin Desert, another ecological region that is a subset of the Great Basin;
