= Rocky Mountain Floristic Region =

Floristic region in North America

Coordinates: 53.75°N 126.12°W

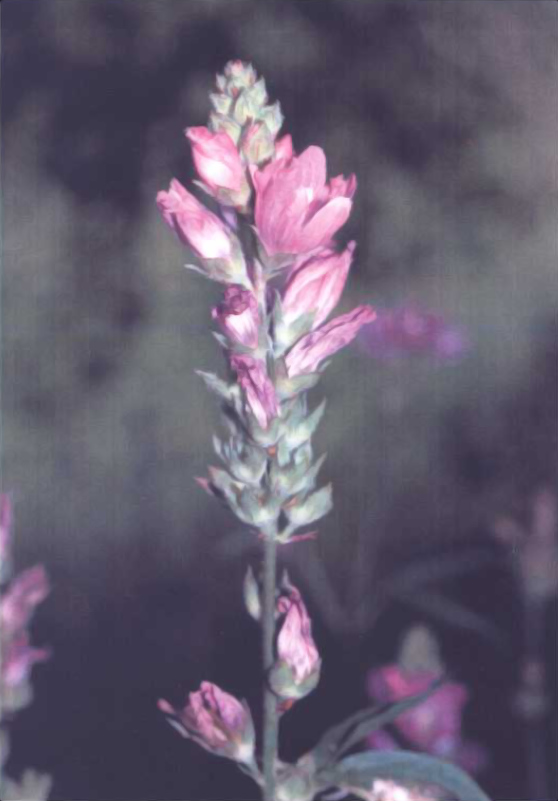
Sidalcea oregana var. calva

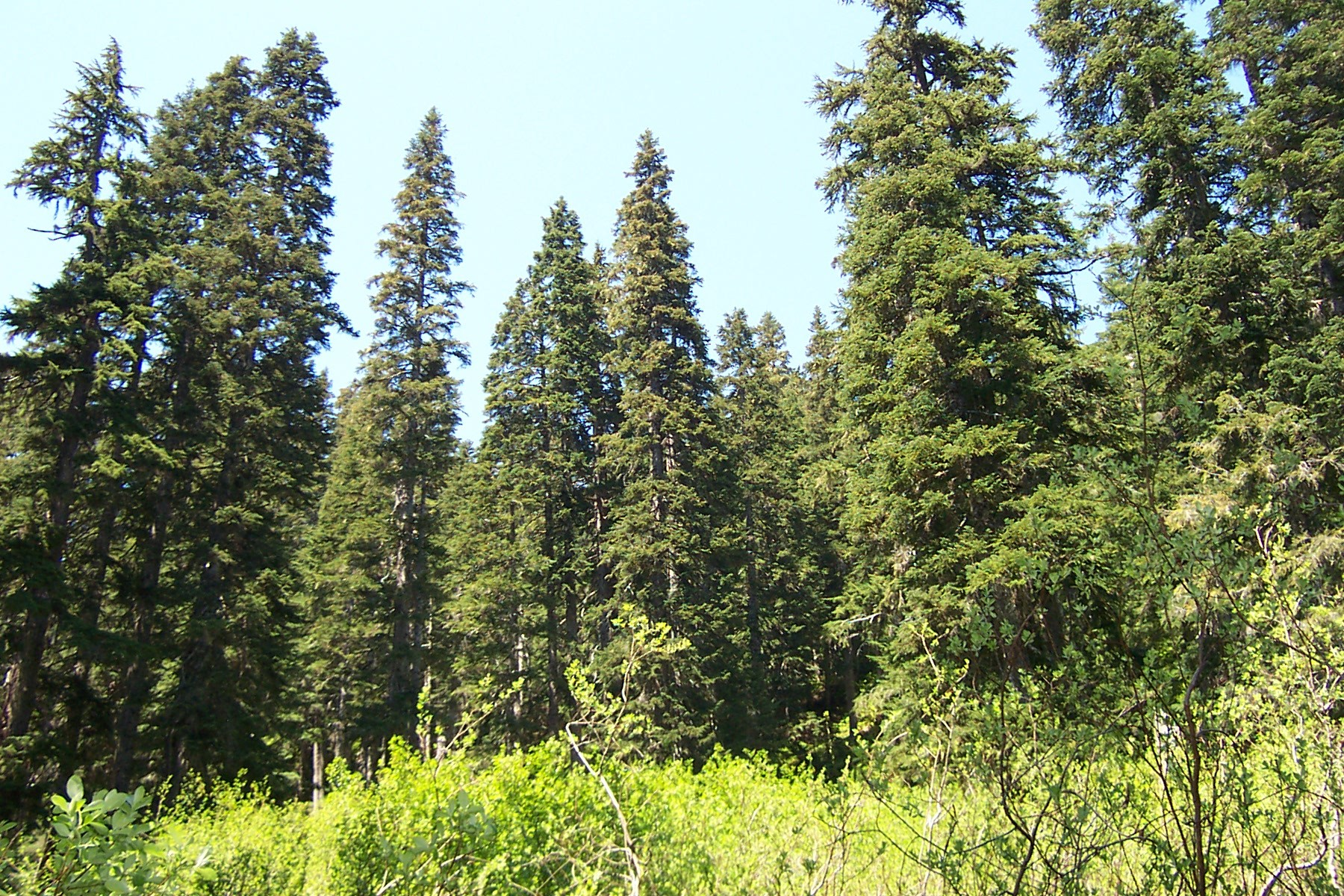
Forest of Pseudotsuga menziesii subsp. menziesii in Washington

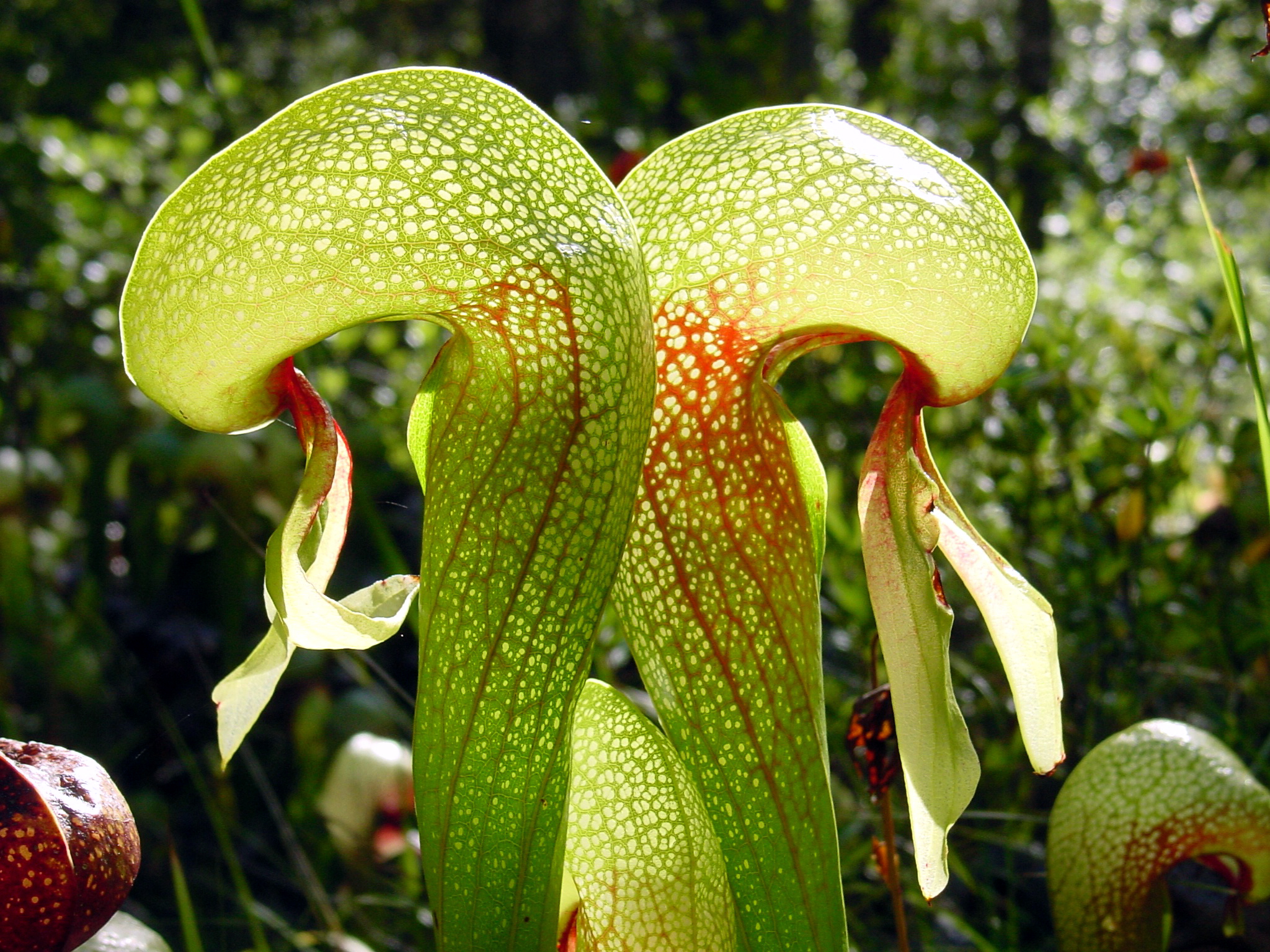
Darlingtonia californica

The Rocky Mountain Floristic Region is a floristic region within the Holarctic Kingdom in western North America (Canada and the United States) delineated by Armen Takhtajan. The region extends from Kodiak Island in Alaska to the San Francisco Bay Area and Sierra Nevada in California. It consists of two provinces, the Vancouverian, which comprises the coastal part of the region for its entire length, including the Pacific Coast Ranges, and the Rocky Mountain, which includes the Rocky Mountains and associated ranges. There are no endemic plant families in the region but many endemic genera and species.

== Geography ==
The region spans from Kodiak Island of Alaska approximately to the San Francisco Bay Area and Sierra Nevada of California, running between the shore of the Pacific Ocean on the west and the Great Plains on the east, along the Rocky Mountains and Pacific Coast Ranges. It is bordered by the Canadian Province of the Circumboreal Region in the north, by the North American Prairies Province of the North American Atlantic Region in the east and by the Californian Province of the Madrean Region in the south. The borders with the Canadian and Californian Provinces are vague.

== Flora ==
Although the Rocky Mountain Region has no endemic vascular plant families and only one endemic Marchantiophyta family (Gyrothyraceae), it has many endemic genera (such as Sidalcea, Luetkea, Whipplea, Vancouveria, Lithophragma, Tellima, Tolmiea, Luina) and numerous endemic species. The genera Arnica, Castilleja, Erigeron, and Lomatium have their major center of diversity here. The region possesses the greatest diversity of conifers in the New World. The remaining wildland of the province is covered mostly by temperate coniferous forests (such as Northern California coastal forests, Maritime Coast Range Ponderosa Pine forests, Klamath-Siskiyou forests, British Columbia mainland coastal forests, Fraser Plateau and Basin complex, Northern Pacific coastal forests) dominated by Pinus ponderosa, Pinus contorta and Pseudotsuga menziesii, as well as the alpine tundra above timberline. The region is subdivided further into the Vancouverian Province and Rocky Mountain Province.

The Vancouverian Province comprises the coastal part of the region for its entire length, including the Pacific Coast Ranges. Such plant species and genera as Sequoia sempervirens, Sequoiadendron giganteum, Darlingtonia californica, Vancouveria and Whipplea are endemic to it. The boundary with the Californian Province is not well-defined.

The Rocky Mountain Province includes the Rocky Mountains and associated ranges. Due to more heavy glaciation during the Pleistocene, its flora, especially in the north, has a far lower degree of endemism than that of the Vancouverian Province. Much of it is shared with the Canadian Province and the Circumboreal Region in general.
