= Flora of Door County, Wisconsin =

Variety of Plants species

Select plants, fungi, and algae found in the county
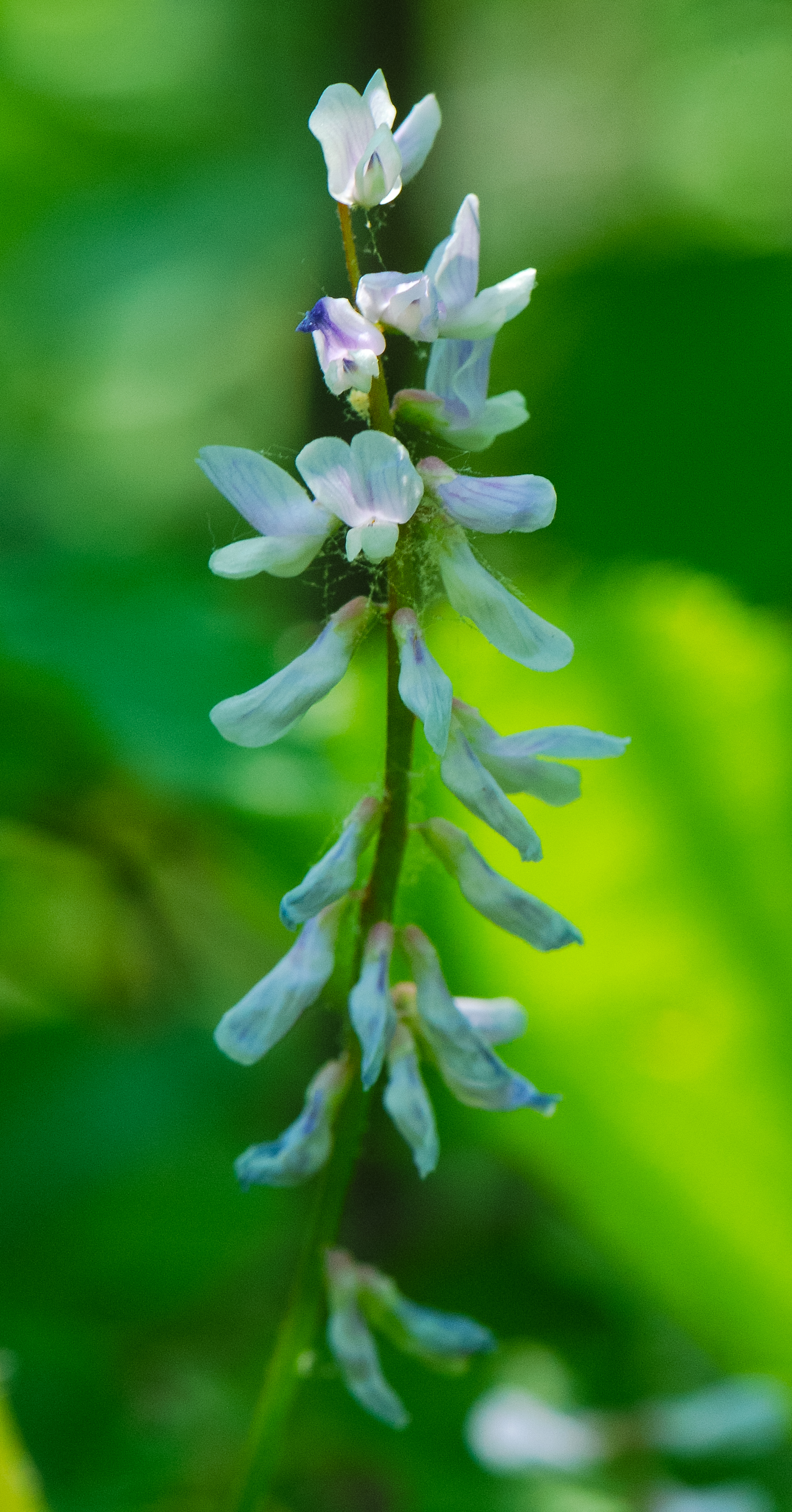

The flora of Door County, Wisconsin comprise a variety of plant species. Geobotanically, Door County belongs to the North American Atlantic Region.

== Plant species lists ==
As of 2019, 1201 species and hybrids of vascular plants have been identified in the county, including the yellow lady's-slipper Cypripedium parviflorum, the official county flower. 255 unique taxa of mosses, liverworts, and hornworts have been identified in Door County.

=== Islands ===
In 2001, species lists were compiled for the county's islands. Snake Island had 156 species, Cana Island had 111, Hat Island 22, Chambers Island 398, Adventure Island 58, Little Strawberry Island 44, Jack Island 28, Horseshoe Island 49, Sister Island 6, Spider Island 42, Plum Island 259, Detroit Island 25, Pilot Island 40, Washington Island 626, Hog Island 34, Rock Island 333, and Gravel and Fish islands were devoid of plant life. In particular, Washington Island is one of only two places in Wisconsin where the fern Asplenium viride (green spleenwort) is found.

=== Lakes ===
In 2006, 60 species of aquatic plants or macrophytic algae were found in Clark Lake and nearby upstream, including spotted pondweed, Potamogeton pulcher, which is endangered in Wisconsin. In 2017, 9 species of aquatic plants were found in the Forestville Millpond, also called the Forestville Dam or Forestville Flowage.

== Rare plants ==
Along with nearby Marinette and Delta (see Garden Peninsula) counties, Door County is home to endemic plants and disjunct populations, such as those protected at Plum Island, Coffee Swamp, Cave Point County Park, the adjacent Whitefish Dunes State Park, and The Ridges Sanctuary. The Grand Traverse islands have some of Wisconsin's richest rare plant reserves.

== Invasive species ==
In 2019, 25 miles of roadsides were surveyed for invasive species, and in 2020, 62 miles of streams were surveyed for invasive species. A county-wide electronic map of Japanese knotweed, Phragmites, teasel, and wild parsnip infested locations is updated annually. Locations of other problem species have also been documented.

== Plant communities unique to the area ==
The county is home to a variety of plant communities, including some unique to the area. Boreal rich fen is called "rich" because the dolomite makes the soil more fertile. Calcicole plants growing in these fens depend on minerals which the dolomite contributes to the soil. The southernmost boreal forests in the state are on the eastern side of the peninsula. In white cedar variant forests, white cedar coexists with hardwoods and balsam fir in upland stands that ordinarily would not support cedar. This forest cover is likely due to the alkaline soil and mostly grows on the Niagara Escarpment along the Green Bay side of the peninsula or near the Lake Michigan shoreline. A combination of high humidity, high levels of calcium and magnesium carbonates from the dolomite, and weathered, nutrient poor soils are thought to limit microbial activity. As a result, a layer of humus builds up from organic matter falling to the ground. The escarpment also features the dry cliff natural community and is home to two rare species of whitlow grass. Other uncommon communities are alvar and the similar Great Lakes alkaline rockshore, also home to rare plants.

== Vegetation along the Green Bay and Lake Michigan shores ==
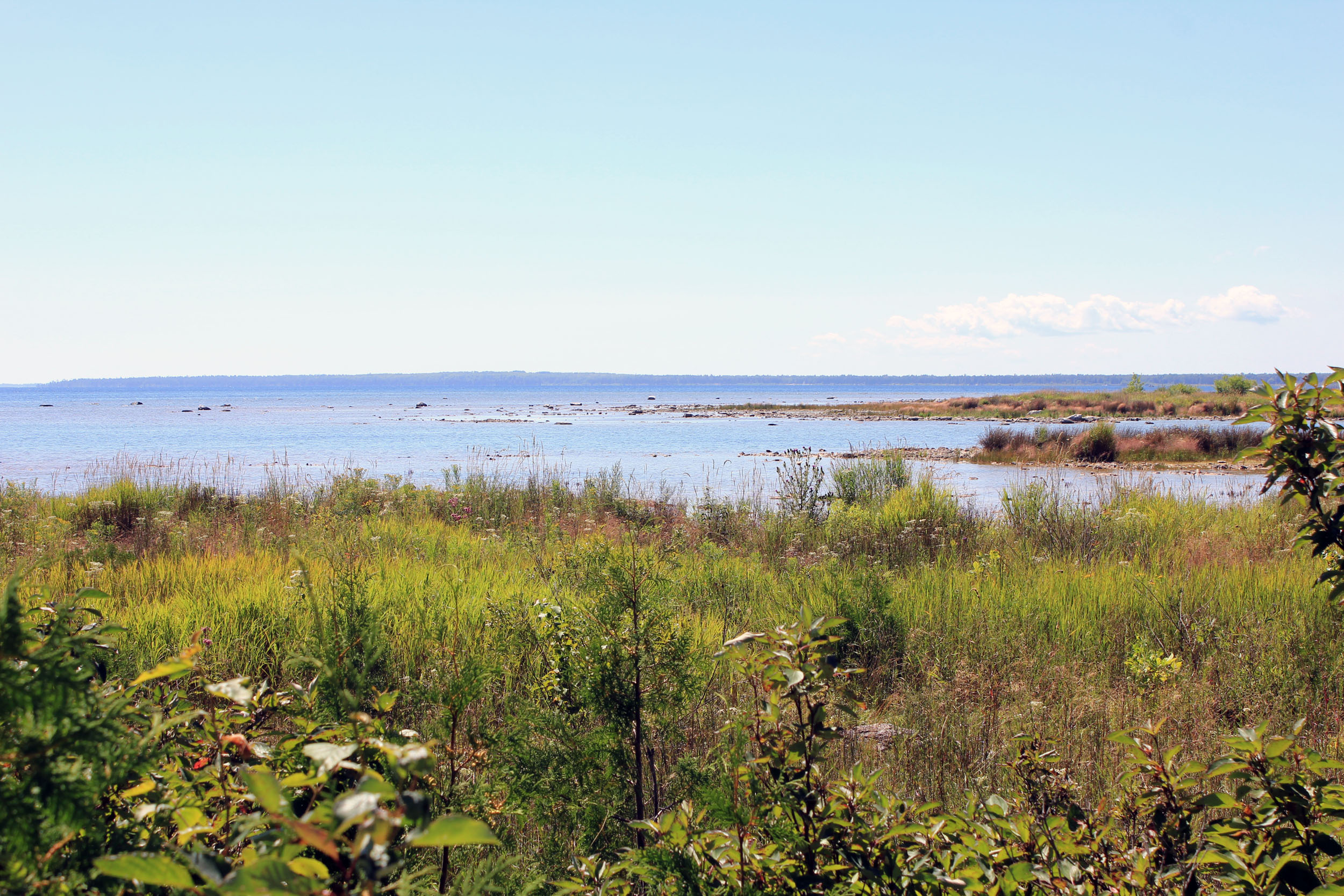
Plants in Newport State Park recolonizing the drawdown zone in August 2013 during a period of low lake levels. Plants present in the background include Anthriscus sylvestris (Queen Anne's lace), goldenrod, Cirsium arvense (Canada thistle), and Phalaris arundinacea (reed canary grass). The foreground includes the woody plants Thuja occidentalis (white cedar), and Cornus sericea (red-osier dogwood).

Yearly fluctuations in lake levels alternately kill off vegetation during periods of high water and promote succession during times of low water. Even during times of high water when low-lying plants are inundated, the populations may persist uphill by clonal expansion and spreading their seeds. Lake Michigan has more diverse shoreline vegetation than Lake Ontario, which has a more stable water level due to human intervention. Without the changing lake levels the shoreline would be dominated by woody plants or highly competitive and even invasive water-loving species such as cattails, reed canary grass, or purple loosestrife. Wet meadows like this one thrive when flooding does not occur often enough to allow emergent vegetation to prevail but is still too frequent to allow the establishment of trees and shrubs.

Out of 268 miles (431 km) miles of county shoreline along Lake Michigan and Green Bay surveyed in 2012, 167.5 miles (269.6 km) was vegetated with of high density shrubs and trees. There was also 3.1 miles (5.0 km) of low density shrubs and trees, 29.3 miles (47.2 km) of moderate density shrubs and trees, 32.6 miles (52.5 km) of unmaintained herbaceous vegetation, 31.8 miles (51.2 km) of manicured lawns, and 3.7 miles (6.0 km) with no vegetation.

== Individual trees ==
Some trees have attracted attention:

- One white cedar found on the escarpment was over 600 years old and near other old-growth cedars.
- The largest tree in the county is a 170-year-old eastern cottonwood on the west side of Highway 57 passing through Institute. It is 110 feet tall and 35 feet in circumference.
- In 1997, striped maple was discovered in a shoreline forest near Newport, the first time this species was documented in the state.
- In 1969, Franklin Gilbert introduced the Viking apple, an early Macintosh moderately resistant to apple scab and fireblight. The original Viking tree is exhibited to the public at the Peninsular Research Station.
- In 1971, a paper birch was found on Detroit Island. At five and a half feet the trunk diameter was thirty-six and six-tenths inches and the circumference was nine and a half feet. Its height was sixty-five feet and its average crown spread was fifty-nine feet.
- In 2005, the state record Lombardy Poplar grew in Ephraim.
- As of 2013, a notable Sugar Maple grew in Sturgeon Bay or to the south of Sturgeon Bay. It had a circumference of 200 inches and a height of 86 feet.
- As of 2013, a Red Oak grew in a cemetery several miles south of Egg Harbor along Highway 42 and had a circumference of 146 inches.
- As of 2013, a White Oak near the county border had a circumference of 149 inches and its height was 86 feet.
- In 1947, a white pine on Washington Island was estimated to be 400 years old.
- As of 2013, an American Elm along the Ahnapee Trail had a circumference of 180 inches. In 1952, an elm in Egg Harbor had the second-largest girth in the state.
- As of 2013, a 90-foot-tall American Beech grew in the White Cliff Fen.

== Macrofungi species lists ==
As of 2019, 243 species of mushrooms and other macrofungi have been identified north of the canal, with 326 species for the county as a whole, including those found in lichens. Several of the more uncommon lichens found in the county are Cetraria arenaria, which grows on the ground, and Anaptychia crinalis, which grows on tree bark.

== Hybrid yeast ==
In 2009, a unique hybrid of Saccharomyces cerevisiae yeast was found on fallen cherries near Fish Creek. This strain of S. cerevisiae descended from both oak-tree and vineyard lineages.

== Spongy moth fungus ==
In 1910, Entomophaga maimaiga from Japan was released in Boston in order to infect spongy moths and control their population. In 1996, it was discovered that E. maimaiga had naturally spread to southern Door County. This was the first time it had been detected in the state.

== See also ==
- Flora of the United States
- Great Lakes § Flora
- List of Michigan flowers
