= Atlantic and Gulf Coastal Plain Province =

The Atlantic and Gulf Coastal Plain province is a coastal plain floristic province within the North American Atlantic Region, a floristic region within the Holarctic Kingdom. It lies to the east and south of the Appalachian province. It encompasses the Atlantic Coastal Plain minus central and southern Florida, and the Gulf Coastal Plain. Although the precise definition varies, it extends as far north as Long Island or southern Nova Scotia, and as far south as eastern Texas or northeastern Mexico. Additionally, at the Mississippi Embayment the province stretches up to the confluence of the Ohio and Mississippi rivers in Cairo, Illinois.

Although no floristic treatment has been attempted on the province, it was designated the 36th biodiversity hotspot in 2016 due to having more than 1,500 endemic plant species combined with 70% habitat loss.

== Additional material ==
- "North American Coastal Plain - Sources". Archived from the original on 2018-02-11.
- Shaw, Ethan (2017-04-25). "What Are the Physical Characteristics of the Atlantic Coastal Plains?". sciencing.com.
