= California floristic province =

Region of uniform plant variety in the western United States and Mexico

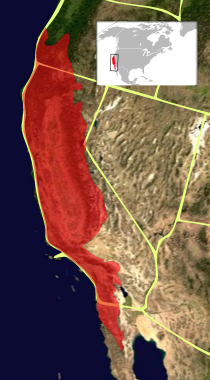
California floristic province

The California floristic province (CFP) is a floristic province located on the Pacific coast of North America, including most of California as well as parts of neighboring states, enclosed by the Pacific Ocean to the west and several mountain ranges to the east. The province has a Mediterranean climate characterized by winter rainfall and summer drought. It is a biodiversity hotspot with distinctive flora, including over 3,000 species of vascular plants, 60% of which are endemic, and is especially known for the giant sequoia tree and its close relative the coast redwood, and for many endemic species which thrive in serpentine soil. Many native species are under threat, especially from wilderness destruction caused by the rapid expansion of agriculture and urban areas, and colonization by invasive species.

With an area of about 294,000 km^{2} (114,000 sq mi), the California floristic province includes 70% of California and extends into southwestern Oregon, a small part of western Nevada and northern Baja California. It belongs to the Madrean region of the Boreal floristic kingdom, and is bordered on its east by the Great Basin province, to the south and southwest by the Sonoran province (which includes the Mojave, Colorado, Sonoran, and Baja California deserts), and to the north by the Vancouverian province of the Rocky Mountain region, though the border is not well defined and some botanists include Oregon and Northern California within the Rocky Mountain region.

== Climate and topography ==
The California floristic province is one of the five biodiversity hotspots with Mediterranean climates, and it is characterized by hot, dry summers and cool, wet winters. Many parts of the coastal areas of this hotspot, being moderated by the ocean, experience cool summers due to the regular occurrence of ocean fog, which sustains redwood forests amongst other communities.

In California, the province includes most of the state excluding the Modoc Plateau, Great Basin and deserts in the southeastern part of the state. In Oregon, the province includes the coastal mountains south of Cape Blanco and most of the Rogue River watershed.

In Baja California, the province includes the forest and chaparral belts of the Sierra de Juárez and the Sierra de San Pedro Mártir (but excluding their desert slopes to the east), coastal areas south to about El Rosario, and Guadalupe Island.

In Nevada, the CFP includes the region of the Sierra in the vicinity of Lake Tahoe, with the eastern border with the Great Basin corresponding roughly to the location of Reno-Carson City.

Parts of the following mountain ranges are included in the province:

- The Klamath Mountains
- The Cascade Range
- The Coast Ranges
- The Sierra Nevada
- The Transverse Ranges
- The Peninsular ranges south into Baja California

The Great Central Valley is also within the CFP.

== California plant communities ==
Numerous plant communities exist in California and botanists have attempted to structure them into identifiable vegetation types groupings.

=== Cismontane region ===
- Coastal strand
- Coastal prairie
- Coastal salt marsh
- Chaparral (hard chaparral)
- Closed-cone pine forest
- Coastal sage scrub (soft chaparral)
- Freshwater marsh
- Maritime coast range ponderosa pine forests
- Montane chaparral (not in Munz)
- North coastal forest (includes north coastal coniferous forest, redwood forest, Douglas-fir forest and mixed evergreen forest)
- Northern coastal scrub
- Riparian woodland
- Valley and foothill woodland (includes northern, southern oak woodland, foothill woodland)
- Valley grassland

=== Montane region ===
- Montane coniferous forest (yellow pine in Munz)
- Montane chaparral (not in Munz)
- Subalpine forest (red fir forest, lodgepole pine forest, bristlecone pine and subalpine forest)
- Montane meadow (not in Munz)
- Alpine fell-field

=== Transmontane region ===
- Pinyon–juniper woodland (includes northern juniper woodland, pinyon–juniper woodland, separate in Munz)
- Sagebrush scrub
- Shadscale scrub
- Alkali sink scrub
- Joshua tree woodland
- Creosote bush woodland

== Endemic species and ecosystems ==
The hotspot presents a higher level of endemism in plants than in animals. Of the 7,031 vascular plants (species, subspecies or varieties) found in the hotspot, 2,153 taxa (in 25 genera) are endemic, meaning they are found nowhere else. About 80,000 km^{2}, or 24.7% of the original vegetation remains in relatively pristine conditions today.

The six largest plant families in California by number of species (40% of all species of vascular plants) are:

- Asteraceae
- Poaceae
- Fabaceae
- Scrophulariaceae
- Brassicaceae
- Cyperaceae

The province notably has giant sequoia forests, California oak woodlands (all native oaks in this ecosystem are endemic, with the exception of Quercus garryana which ranges into southwestern British Columbia) and redwood forests. Other ecosystems include sagebrush steppes, prickly pear shrublands, coastal sage scrub, chaparral, juniper-pine woodland, upper montane-subalpine forests, alpine forests, riparian forests, cypress forests, mixed evergreen forests, and Douglas fir forests, coastal dunes, mudflats and salt marshes.

A few examples of plants that are endemic to the province and are also endangered species are:

- Baker's larkspur
- Gowen cypress
- Hickman's potentilla
- Point Reyes bird's beak
- Santa Cruz tarplant
- Santa Rosa Island manzanita

== Threatened and endangered ==
Agriculture and urban expansion are encroaching upon remaining habitats in the California floristic province. Commercial farming in the region generates half of all agricultural products consumed by the United States population. The large farms that grow from this demand cause the greater loss of the biodiversity hotspot's natural un-renewable resources. California has one of the highest human populations rendering it one of the four most ecologically degraded expanses in the United States. Other threats include invasive species, strip mining, oil extraction, air pollution, soil contamination, livestock grazing, and wildfires. Global warming presents future threats. Research done by United States Ecologist, Dr. Erik Beever, suggests that global warming may have had a hand in the local extinction of the pika populations in the Great Basin area east of the Sierra Nevada. More research proposes that as the temperature keeps rising, alpine species will begin to migrate north looking for cooler climates that can support more of a sustainable habitat. Reducing emissions from the burning of fossil fuels such as coal, oil, and gas is the first step in the fight against global warming.

== Conservation efforts ==
The California floristic province is a world biodiversity hotspot as defined by Conservation International, due to an unusually high concentration of endemic plants: approximately 8,000 plant species in the geographic region, and over 3,400 taxa limited to the CFP proper, as well as having lost over 70% of its primary vegetation. A biodiversity hotspot contains irreplaceable areas to the plants and animals that live there. Among these unique regions, almost every one of them is subject to their exclusive species being at greater risk from the impact of humans. The greatest threat to this area is wilderness destruction caused by large commercial farming industries and the heavy expansion of urban areas. Conservation International proposed a strategy in 1998, to focus more specifically on areas of the California floristic province that contained the most human impact in order to lower the threat to the region. The issues that are causing the most threats to this province include but are not limited to population pressures, loss of habitat, unsustainable resource use, and introduced non-native species.

Biodiversity hotspots face the highest threats due to the fact that their resources and animal or plant species cannot be replicated or found in any other regions on the planet. Conservation efforts receive little to no funding to put toward the protection of these extremely distinctive hotspots. So establishing priorities on where to focus efforts is essential. In 1988, British ecologist, Norman Myers discovered the ten tropical hotspots that contained endemic species. Then, in 1990, Myers added eight more hotspots to the list, one of which was the California floristic province. Due to Meyer's extensive research into the biodiversity of these hotspots, Conservation International began a major assessment of these regions in 1996. It is not until 1999, however, that Conservation International finally sets restrictions on what makes up the criteria for a biodiversity hotspot. The California floristic province contained more than 1,500 endemic species of vascular plants and had lost at least 70% of its original natural habitat, and so it became the eighth ranked hotspot in the world. As a result, 37% of the province is now under official protection. California had spent more money on the conservation of these precious lands than any other state in America. The conservation efforts created to protect the California floristic province would not be possible without the major contributions from organizations such as the Sierra Club, Nature Conservancy, Wilderness Society and the California Native Plant Society.

== See also ==
- List of California native plants (selected native and endemic plants of California)
- Category:Endemic flora of California (list of plant species endemic to California)
- Madrean Region
