= Flora and fauna of the United States =

Flora and fauna of the United States may refer to:

- Flora of the United States
- Fauna of the United States
