= Appalachian province =

Floristic province in North America

The Appalachian province is a floristic province within the North American Atlantic region, a floristic region within the Holarctic kingdom. It was historically covered by deciduous forest. The province includes southern Ontario and Quebec, down to central Georgia and Alabama. It includes most of Arkansas, part of eastern Texas, and stretches west through the Ouachita Mountains, Ozark Plateau, eastern Iowa, and southeastern Minnesota. It is bounded on the north by the Canadian province, on the east and south by the Atlantic and Gulf Coastal Plain province, and on the west by the North American Prairies province.

== See also ==
- Appalachian Mountains
