= North American Atlantic region =

Floristic region in the Holarctic kingdom

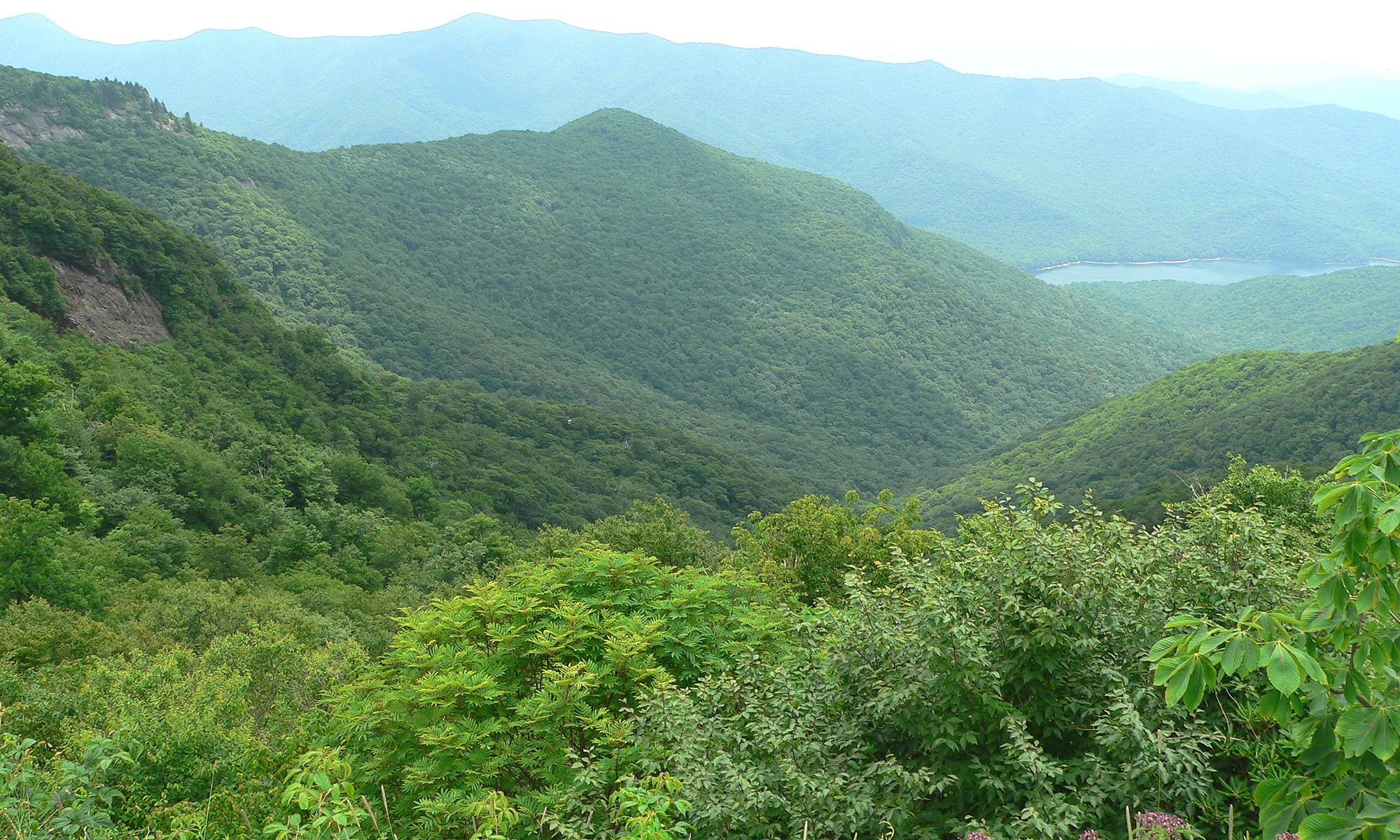
The Blue Ridge, heartland of the region

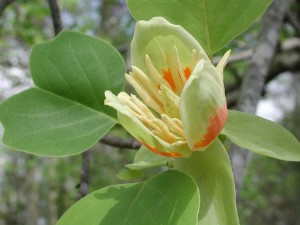
Liriodendron tulipifera, closely related to L. chinense from China

The North American Atlantic region is a floristic region within the Holarctic kingdom identified by Armen Takhtajan and Robert F. Thorne, spanning from the Atlantic and Gulf coasts to the Great Plains and comprising a major part of the United States and southeastern portions of Canada. It is bordered by the Circumboreal floristic region in the north, by the Rocky Mountain and Madrean floristic regions in the west and by the Caribbean floristic region of the Neotropical kingdom in the south of Florida. The flora of the region comprises two endemic monotypic families, Hydrastidaceae and Leitneriaceae, and is characterized by about a hundred of endemic genera (such as Sanguinaria, Leavenworthia, Gillenia, Neviusia, Dionaea, Yeatesia, Pleea). The degree of species endemism is very high, many species are Tertiary relicts, which survived the Wisconsin glaciation and are now concentrated in the Appalachians (esp. Blue Ridge Mountains) and the Ozarks. A number of genera (Sarracenia, Uvularia etc.) are shared only with the Canadian floristic province of the Circumboreal region. Moreover, as has long been noted (e.g. by Joseph Gerhard Zuccarini and especially by Asa Gray), a large number of relict genera (Liriodendron, Hamamelis, Stewartia etc.) are shared with the relatively distant Eastern Asiatic Region (comprising Japan, Korea, and the east of China) and sometimes Southeast Asia. R. F. Thorne counted at least 74 genera restricted to eastern North America and Asia (mostly eastern and southeastern Asia). The fossil record indicates that during the Tertiary period a warm temperate zone extended across much of the Northern Hemisphere, linking America to Asia.

== Subdivisions ==
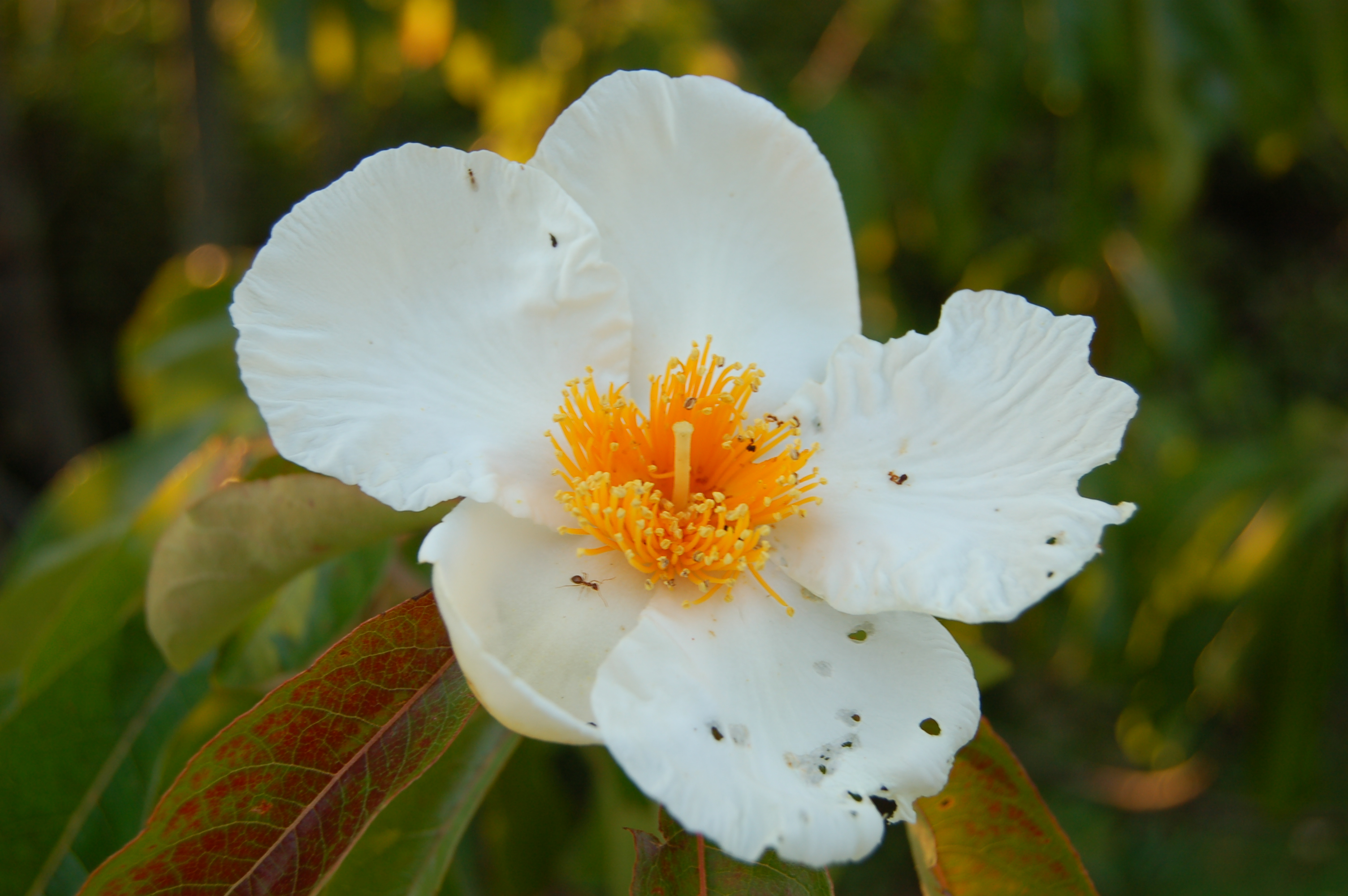
Franklinia alatamaha, endemic species of Georgia, now extinct in the wild

The North American Atlantic Region is subdivided further into three floristic provinces: the Appalachian Province, Atlantic and Gulf Coastal Plain Province, and North American Prairies province.

=== Appalachian province ===
The Appalachian province comprises the upland eastern North America that was covered by deciduous forest in historic times, concentrated around the Appalachians and Ozarks, where its flora found refuge during Pleistocene glaciations. It stretches from southernmost Ontario and Quebec to Arkansas and easternmost Texas and from central Georgia and Alabama to eastern Iowa and southeastern Minnesota. The remaining wildland of the province is covered predominantly by temperate broadleaf and mixed forests dominated by oaks, hickories, maples and Tsuga and is characterized by the highest degree of endemism within the floristic region. It includes such ecoregions as the Appalachian mixed mesophytic forests, Appalachian-Blue Ridge forests and the Piedmont (as far east as the Fall Line).

=== Atlantic and Gulf Coastal Plain province ===
The Atlantic and Gulf Coastal Plain province is a strip of coastal plain, very narrow on the north, lying to the east and south of the Appalachian Province and stretching from the southernmost Nova Scotia through Georgia and Florida to eastern Texas, extending into the Mississippi Embayment up to the southern tip of Illinois. Due to Pleistocene inundations, most of its flora is much younger than that of the Appalachian province, but the degree of endemism is still high. The remaining wildland of the province is occupied mostly by temperate coniferous forests as well as temperate mixed forests dominated by pines (including such ecoregions as the Northeastern coastal forests, New England-Acadian forests, Atlantic coastal pine barrens). This province can be subdivided into smaller areas, most notably the Gulf Coastal Plain and the Atlantic Plain.

=== North American Prairies province ===
The North American Prairies province is a large grassland floristic province lying between the Appalachian Province and the Rocky Mountains and including the prairies of the Great Plains. It is bounded by the Canadian coniferous forests on the north and the arid semideserts to the southwest. The province itself is occupied by temperate grasslands, savannas, and shrublands (including such ecoregions as the Flint Hills tall grasslands, Sand Hills, High Plains). Endemism is rather limited in this province, and its boundaries are vague. During the Pleistocene much of the province was glaciated.

== Endemic taxa ==
Endemics of the Appalachian province

Families
Genera

Cymophyllus
Galax
Rugelia
Jamesianthus
Nestronia
Rugelia

Species and lower taxa

Cardamine flagellifera
Cardamine clematitis
Convallaria majuscula
Clematis albicoma
Shortia galacifolia
Pinus pungens
Oncophorus raui

Gratiola amphiantha
Gymnocarpium appalachianum
Cimicifuga americana
Seymeria cassioides
Pyrularia pubera
Chrysogonum virginianum
Liatris helleri
Diphylleia cymosa
Galium arkansanum
Echinacea paradoxa
Delphinium treleasei
Scutellaria bushii
Hamamelis vernalis
Abies fraseri
Picea rubens
Magnolia fraseri
Phlox buckleyi
Trifolium virginicum
Senecio antennariifolius
Paxistima canbyi

Endemics of the Atlantic and Gulf Coastal Plain province

Families

Leitneriaceae

Genera

Balduina
Ceratiola
Dicerandra
Franklinia
Lachnanthes
Macranthera
Pinckneya
Pleea
Pyxidanthera
Rhapidophyllum
Schwalbea
Sclerolepis
Stokesia
Warea
Zenobia

Species and lower taxa

Taxodium ascendens
Magnolia macrophylla subsp. ashei
Magnolia pyramidata
Magnolia grandiflora
Harperocallis flava

Endemics of the North American Prairies province

Species and lower taxa

Phlox oklahomensis
Lespedeza leptostachya
Eustoma russellianum

Endemics of the Appalachian province and the Atlantic and Gulf Coastal Plain province

Genera

Sanguinaria

Species and lower taxa

Liriodendron tulipifera
Taxodium distichum
Castanea pumila
Hamamelis virginiana
Magnolia macrophylla subsp. macrophylla
Magnolia virginiana
Magnolia acuminata
Magnolia tripetala

Endemics of the Appalachian province and the North American Prairies province

Genera
Species and lower taxa

Endemics of the Atlantic and Gulf Coastal Plain province and the North American Prairies province

Genera
Species and lower taxa

Endemics of the Appalachian province, the Atlantic and Gulf Coastal Plain province and the North American Prairies province

Genera
Species and lower taxa

== See also ==
- Flora of Arkansas
- Flora of Connecticut
- Flora of Door County, Wisconsin

== Bibliography ==
- Thorne, Robert F. Phytogeography of North America North of Mexico. Flora of North America, Vol. 1, Ch. 6.
