= High Plains (United States) =

Subregion in the United States

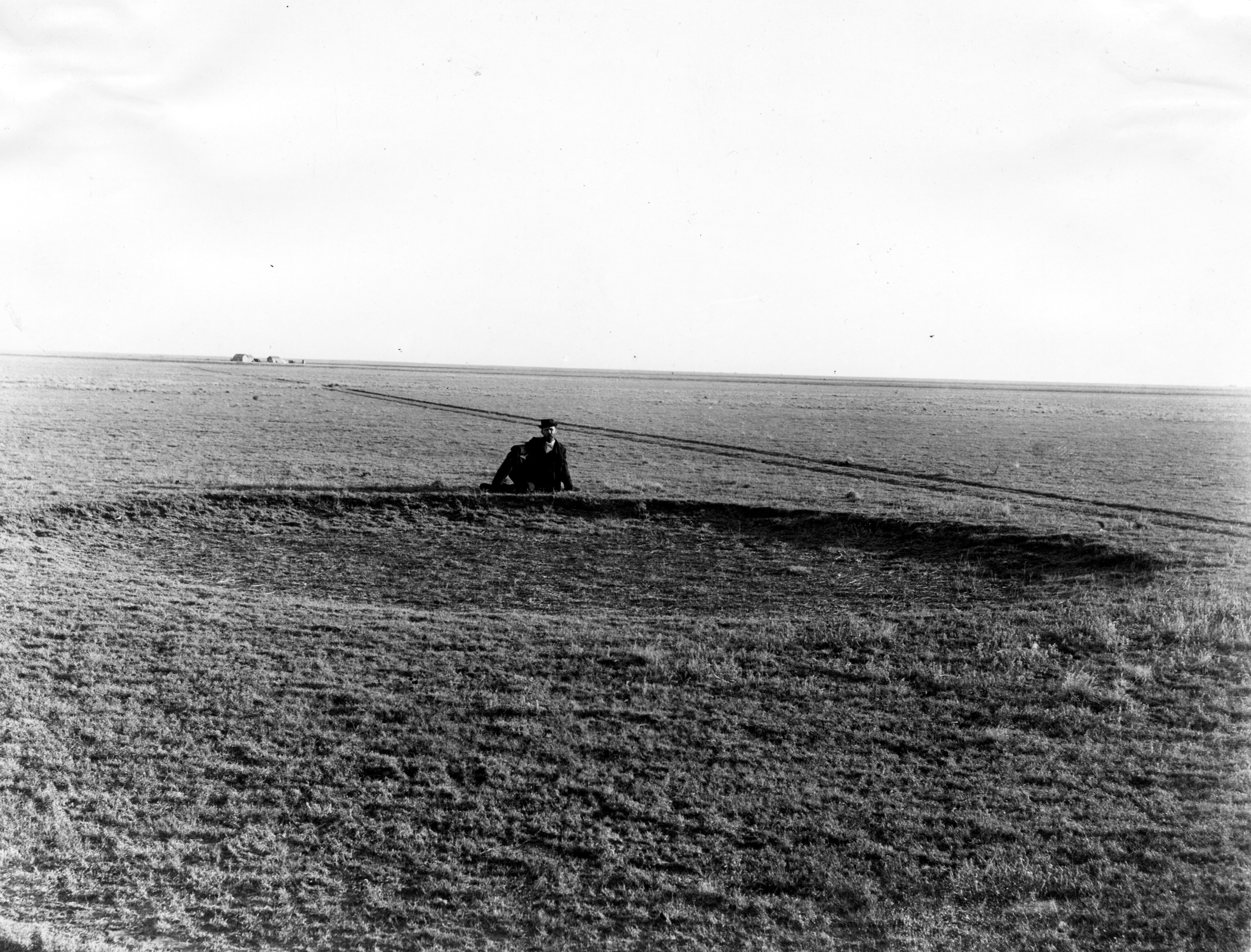
- A buffalo wallow on the High Plains.

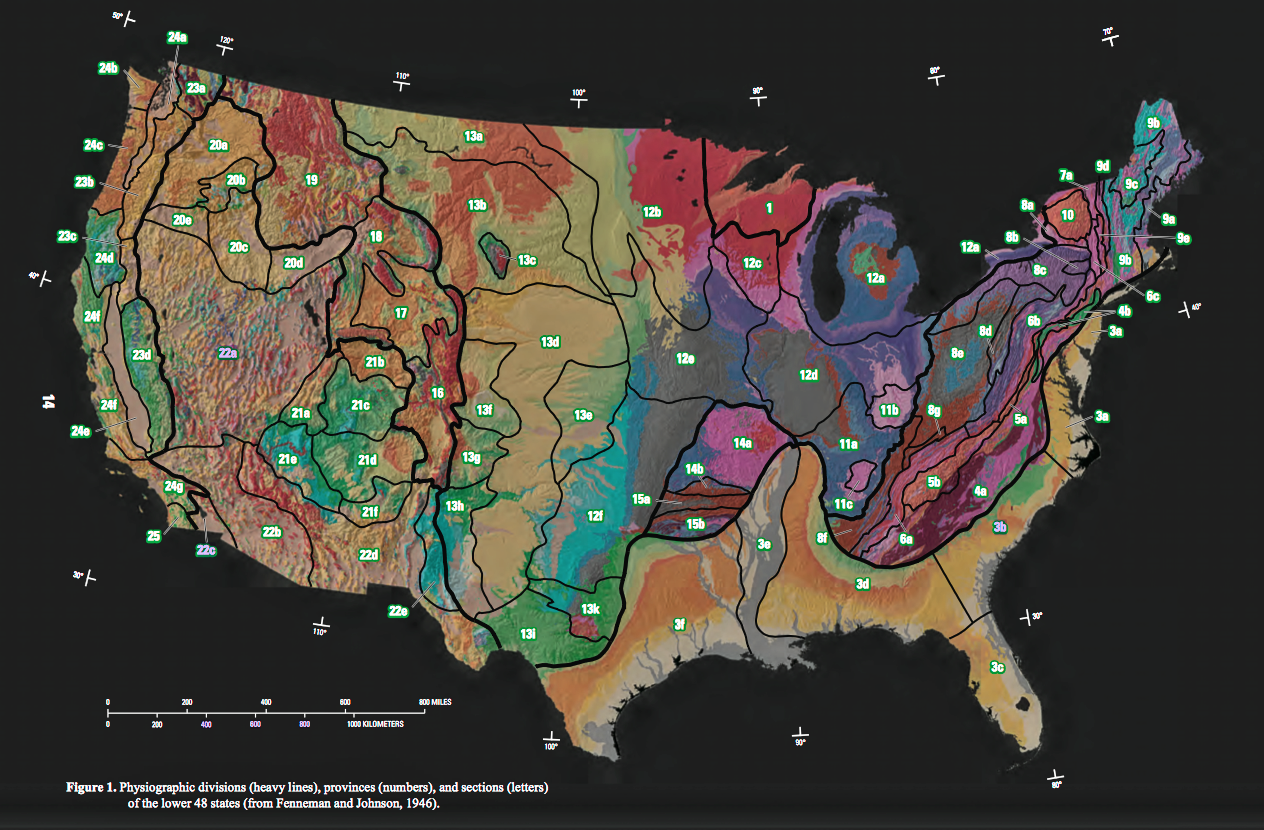
- Physiographic regions of the United States. The High Plains physiographic region is the center yellow area designated 13d.
- Floor elevation: 1,500–6,000 ft (460–1,830 m)
- Length: 800 mi (1,300 km)
- Width: 400 mi (640 km)
- Area: 174,000 mi^{2} (450,000 km^{2})

Geography
- Country: United States

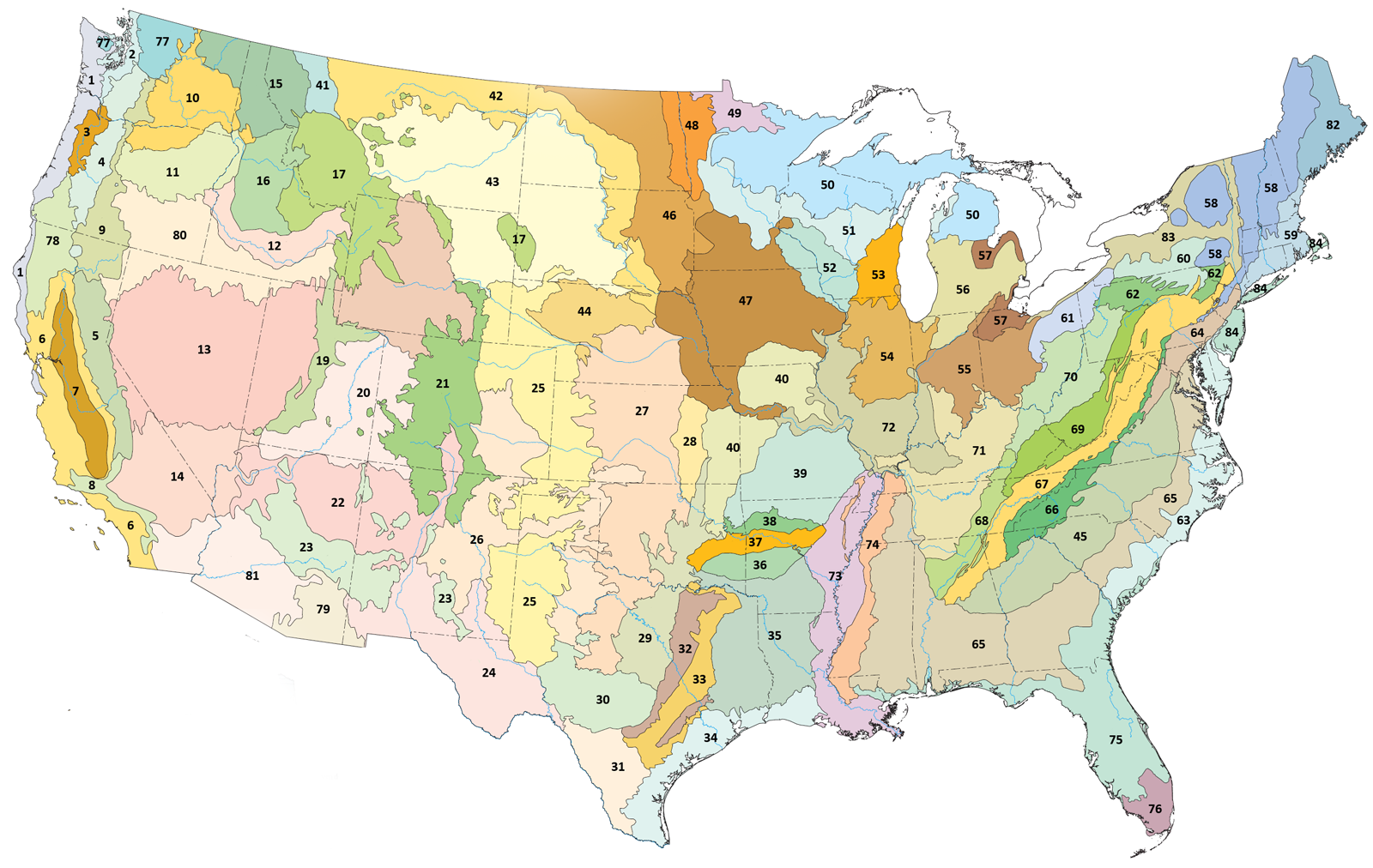
The High Plains ecoregion of the United States is designated by 25 on this map.

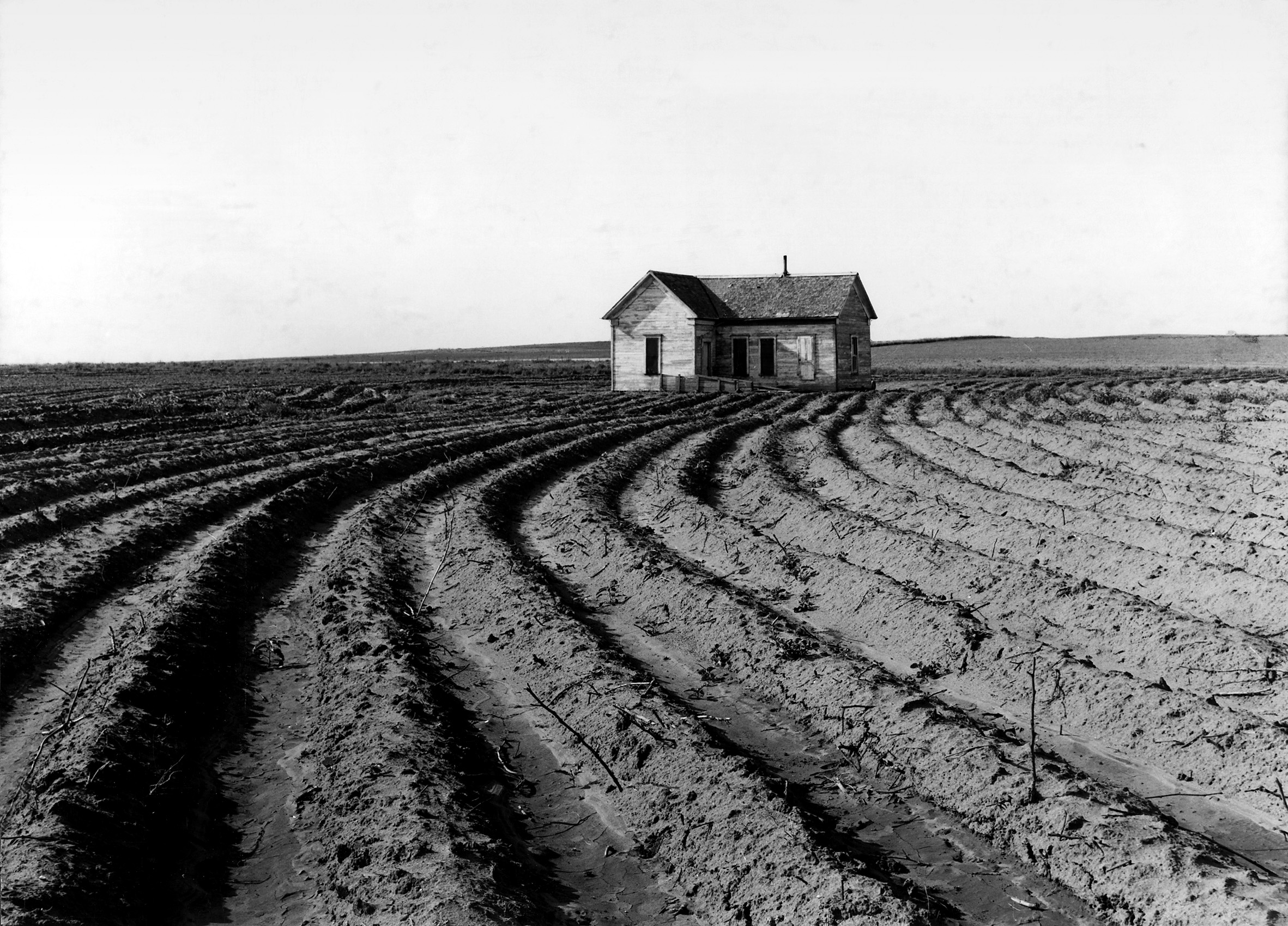
Childress County, Texas, June 1938.

The High Plains are a subregion of the Great Plains, mainly in the Western United States, but also partly in the Midwest states of Nebraska, Kansas, and South Dakota, generally encompassing the western part of the Great Plains before the region reaches the Rocky Mountains. The High Plains are located in eastern Montana, southeastern Wyoming, southwestern South Dakota, western Nebraska, eastern Colorado, western Kansas, eastern New Mexico, the Oklahoma Panhandle, and the Texas Panhandle. The southern region of the Western High Plains ecology region contains the geological formation known as Llano Estacado which can be seen from a short distance or on satellite maps. From east to west, the High Plains rise in elevation from around 1,500 to 6,000 ft (460 to 1,830 m).

== Name ==
The term "Great Plains", for the region west of about the 96th or 98th meridian and east of the Rocky Mountains, was not generally used before the early 20th century. In the 19th century it was known as the Great American Desert. Nevin Fenneman's 1916 study, Physiographic Subdivision of the United States, brought the term Great Plains into more widespread usage. Prior to 1916, the region was almost invariably called the High Plains, in contrast to the lower Prairie Plains of the Midwestern states. Today, the term "High Plains" is usually used for a subregion instead of the whole of the Great Plains.

== Geography and climate ==
The High Plains has a "cold semi-arid" climate—Köppen BSk—receiving between 10–20 in (250–510 mm) of precipitation annually.

Due to low moisture and high elevation, the High Plains commonly experience wide ranges and extremes in temperature. The temperature range from day to night is usually 30 °F (17 °C), and 24-hour temperature shifts of 100 °F (56 °C) are possible, as evidenced by a weather event that occurred in Browning, Montana, from January 23–24, 1916, when the temperature fell from 44 to −56 °F (7 to −49 °C). This is the world record for the greatest temperature change in 24 hours. The region is known for the steady, and sometimes intense, winds that prevail from the west. The winds add a considerable wind chill factor in the winter. The development of wind farms in the High Plains is one of the newest areas of economic development.

The High Plains are anomalously high in elevation. An explanation has recently been proposed to explain this high elevation. As the Farallon plate was subducted into the mantle beneath the region, water trapped in hydrous minerals in the descending slab was forced up into the lower crust above. Within the crust, this water caused the hydration of dense garnet and other phases into lower density amphibole and mica minerals. The resulting increase in crustal volume raised the elevation by about one mile.

== Flora ==
Typical plant communities of the region are shortgrass prairie, prickly pear cacti and scrub. Sagebrush steppe is also present, particularly in high and dry areas closer to the Rocky Mountains.

== Economy ==
Agriculture in the forms of cattle ranching and the growing of wheat, corn, and sunflower is the primary economic activity in the region. The region's aridity necessitates either dryland farming methods or irrigation; much water for irrigation is drawn from the underlying Ogallala Aquifer, which makes it possible to grow water-intensive crops such as corn, which the region's aridity would otherwise not support. Some areas of the High Plains have significant petroleum and natural gas deposits.

The combination of oil, natural gas, and wind energy, along with plentiful underground water, has allowed some areas (such as West Texas) to sustain a range of economic activity, including occasional industry. For example, the ASARCO refinery in Amarillo, Texas has been in operation since 1924 due to the plentiful and inexpensive natural gas and water that are needed in metal ore refining.

== Demographics ==
The High Plains has one of the lowest population densities of any region in the continental United States; Wyoming, for example, has the second lowest population density in the country after Alaska. In contrast to the stagnant population growth in the northern and western High Plains, cities in west Texas have shown sustained growth; Amarillo and Lubbock both have populations above 200,000 and have continued to grow. Smaller towns, on the other hand, often struggle to sustain their population.

== Major cities and towns ==
- Alliance, Nebraska
- Amarillo, Texas
- Arvada, Colorado
- Aurora, Colorado
- Boulder, Colorado
- Canadian, Texas
- Centennial, Colorado
- Chadron, Nebraska
- Cheyenne, Wyoming
- Clovis, New Mexico
- Colby, Kansas
- Colorado Springs, Colorado
- Denver, Colorado
- Dodge City, Kansas
- Douglas, Wyoming
- Fort Collins, Colorado
- Fort Morgan, Colorado
- Garden City, Kansas
- Gering, Nebraska
- Gillette, Wyoming
- Goodland, Kansas
- Greeley, Colorado
- Guymon, Oklahoma
- Hays, Kansas
- Hobbs, New Mexico
- Kimball, Nebraska
- La Junta, Colorado
- Lakewood, Colorado
- Lamar, Colorado
- Las Vegas, New Mexico
- Liberal, Kansas
- Longmont, Colorado
- Lubbock, Texas
- Midland, Texas
- Miles City, Montana
- Odessa, Texas
- Ogallala, Nebraska
- Pecos, Texas
- Plainview, Texas
- Portales, New Mexico
- Pueblo, Colorado
- Rapid City, South Dakota
- Roswell, New Mexico
- Santa Rosa, New Mexico
- Scottsbluff, Nebraska
- Sidney, Nebraska
- Sterling, Colorado
- Thornton, Colorado
- Torrington, Wyoming
- Tucumcari, New Mexico
- Ulysses, Kansas
- Vaughn, New Mexico
- Westminster, Colorado
- Wheatland, Wyoming
- North Platte, Nebraska
- Big Spring, Texas

== Gallery ==
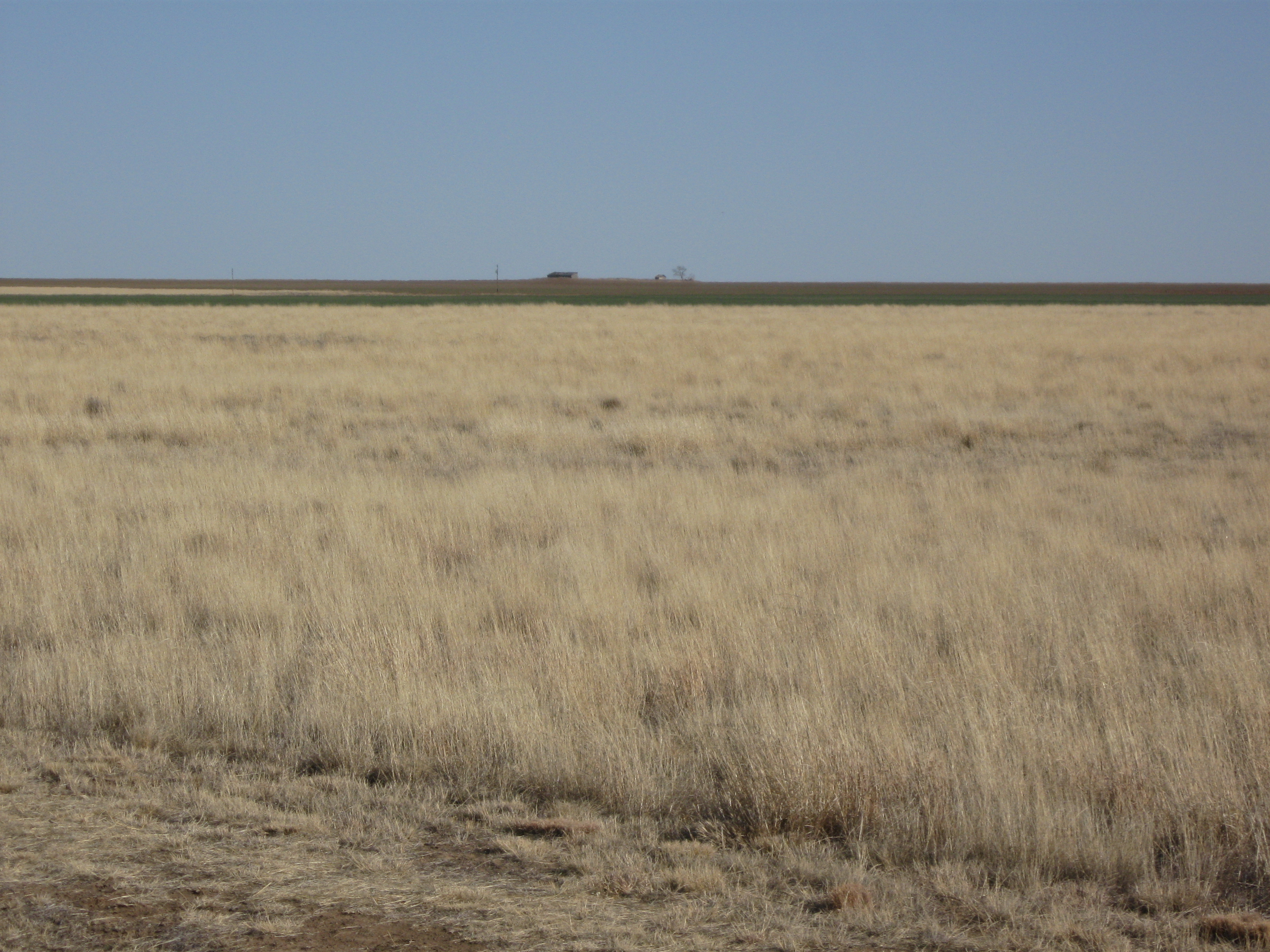
Cimarron County near Boise City. (2009)

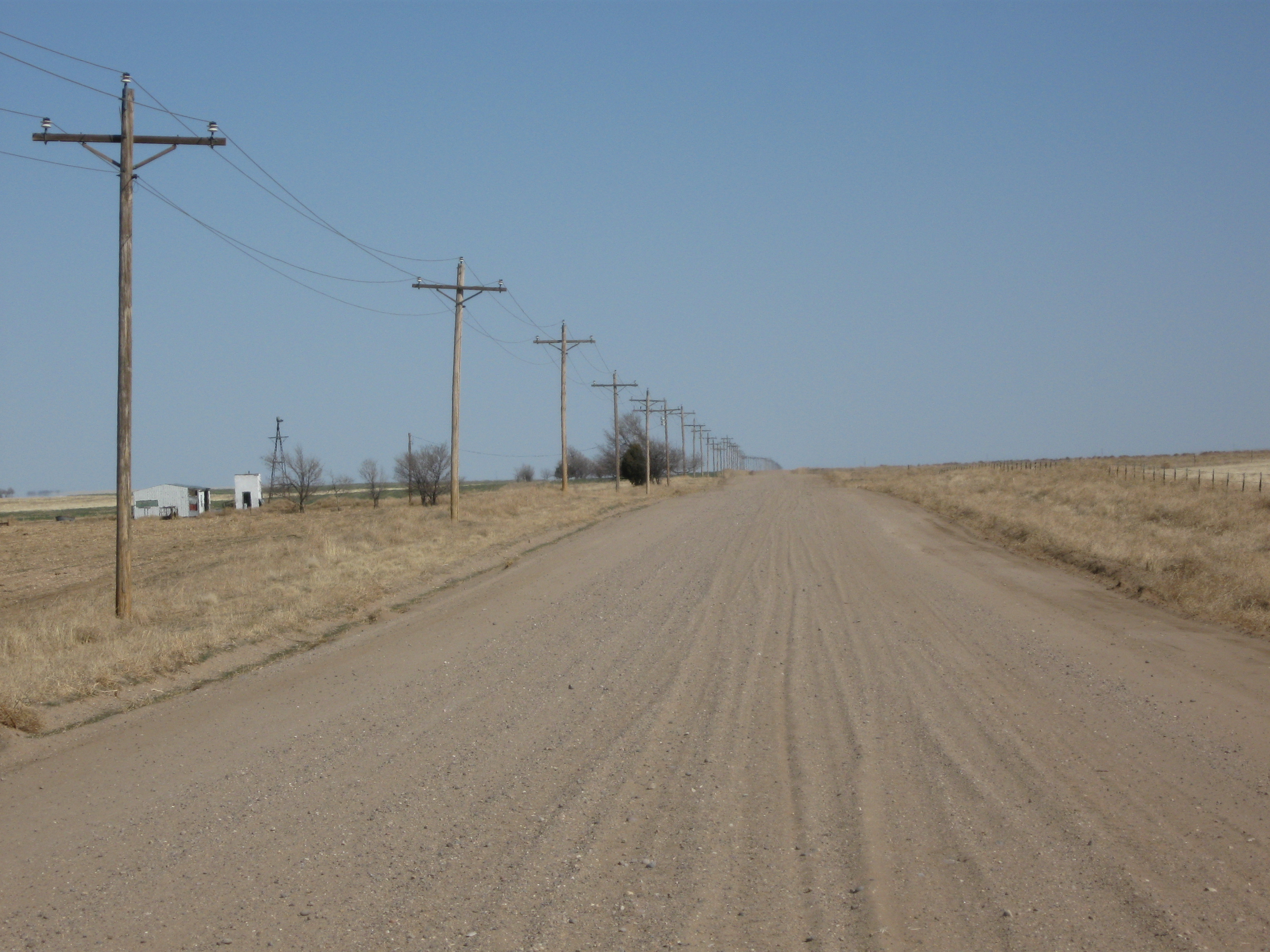
High Plains in Southeastern Colorado (2009)

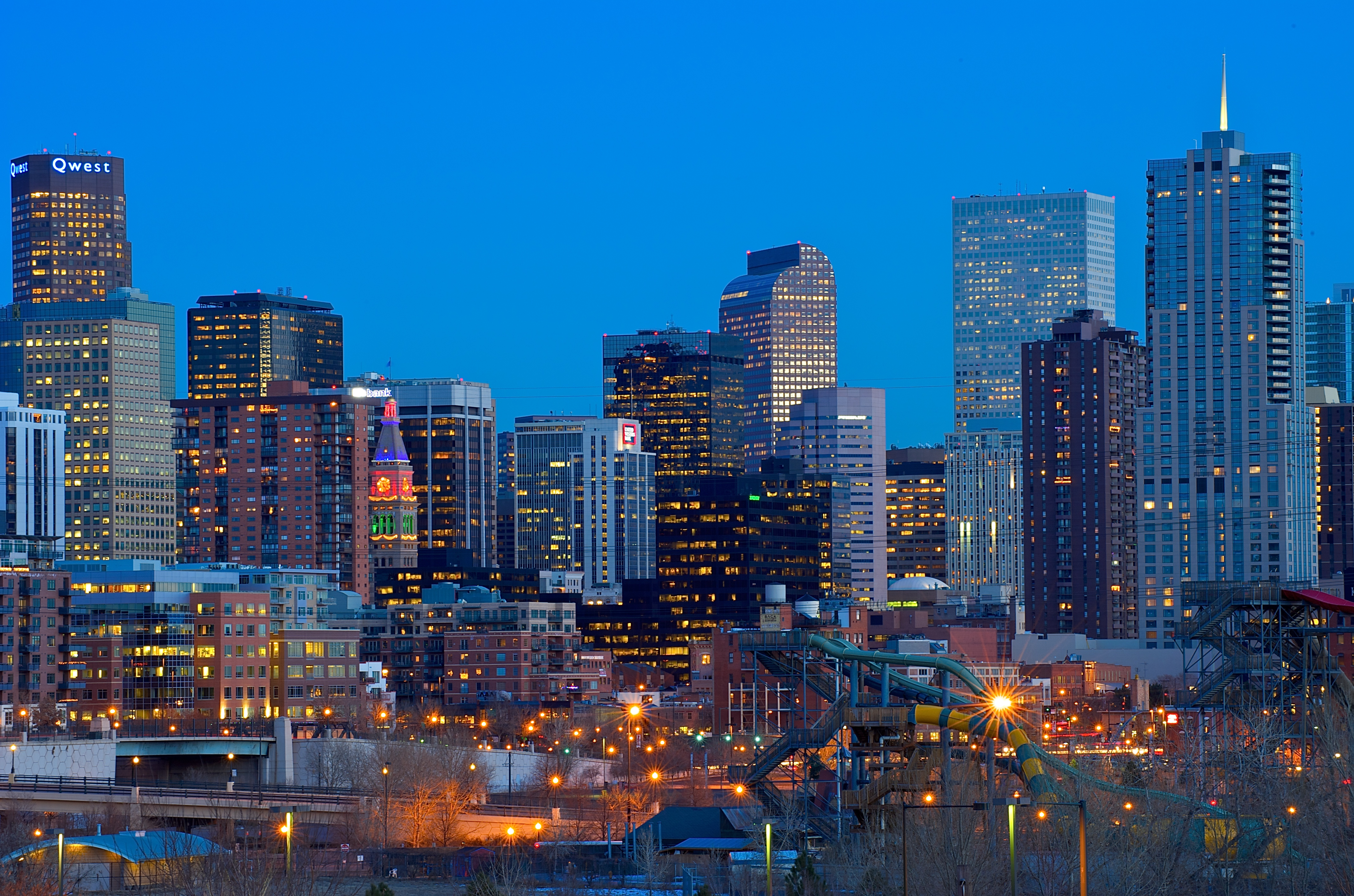
Denver was known as the "Queen City of the Plains".

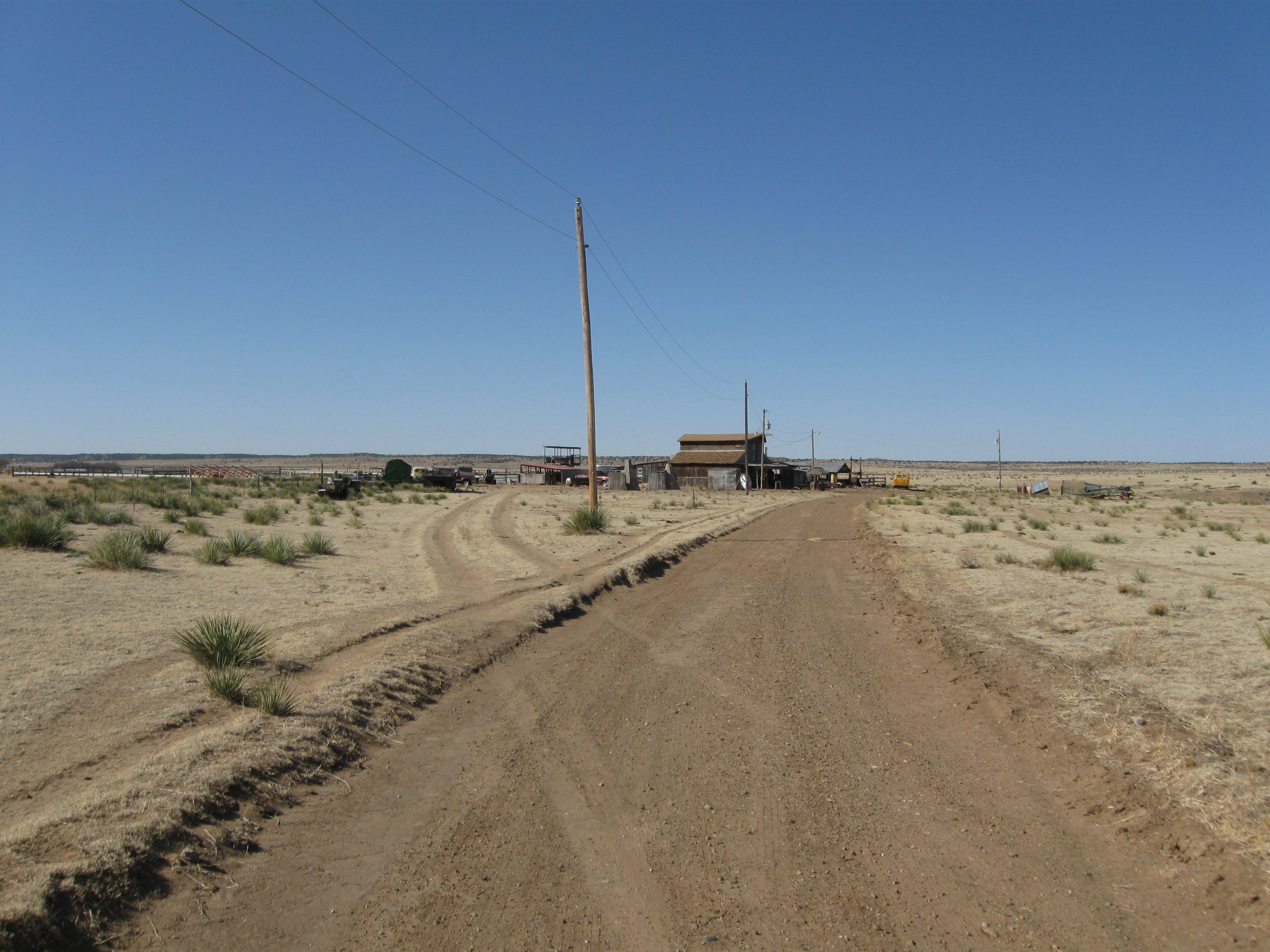
High Plains in Oklahoma west of Guymon (2009)

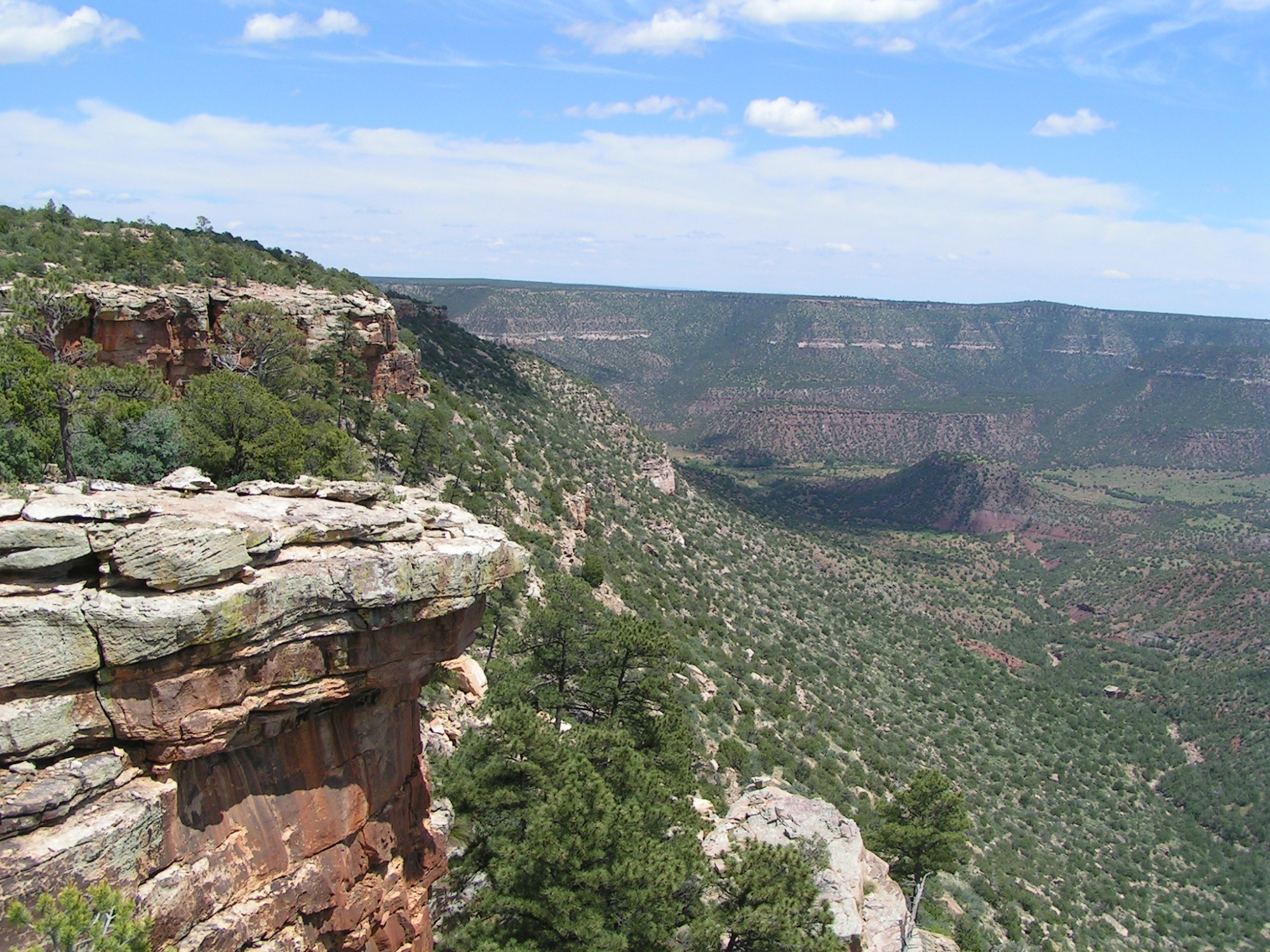
The High Plains are broken in places by canyons, such as this one in Sabinoso Wilderness in New Mexico.

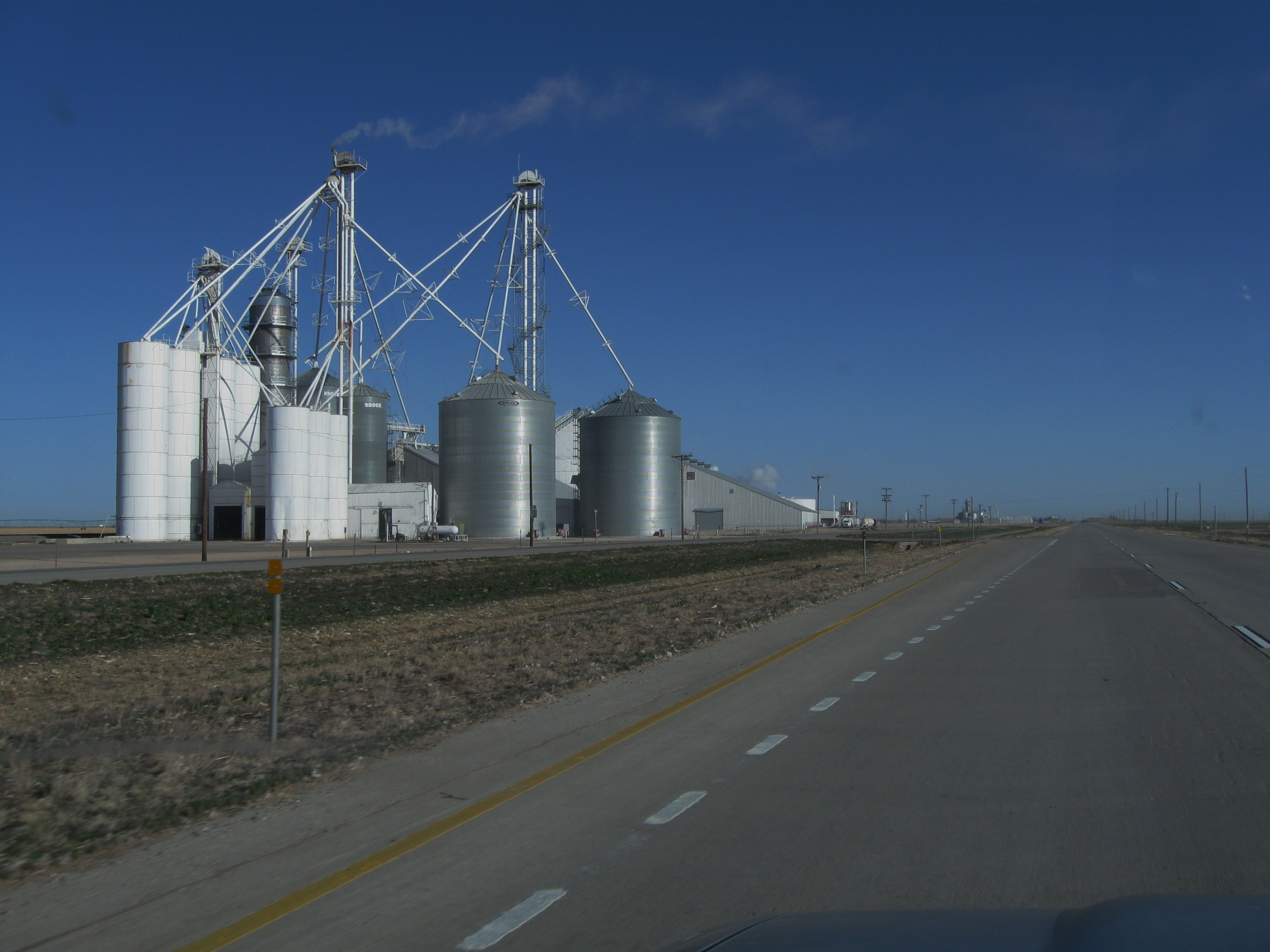
Grain silos, a common sight on the High Plains. (2009)

== See also ==
- Altiplano
- Dust storm
- Flora of the Great Plains (North America)
- List of ecoregions in the United States (EPA)
- Llano Estacado
- North American Prairies province
- Steppe
- Temperate grasslands, savannas, and shrublands—Biome
- Texas High Plains AVA, wine region in the Texas section of the High Plains
- Tibetan Plateau
- Western short grasslands
- Wind power in Texas
