= Trapella =

Scientific classification
- Kingdom: Plantae
- Clade: Tracheophytes
- Clade: Angiosperms
- Clade: Eudicots
- Clade: Asterids
- Order: Lamiales
- Family: Plantaginaceae
- Genus: Trapella; Oliv. (1887)
- Species: T. sinensis

Binomial name
- Trapella sinensis Oliv. (1887)

Synonyms
- Trapa antennifera H.Lév. (1899); Trapella antennifera (H.Lév.) Glück (1939); Trapella sinensis var. antennifera (H.Lév.) H.Hara (1941)

Genus of flowering plants

Trapella sinensis is a species of flowering plant belonging to the family Plantaginaceae. It is the sole species in genus Trapella.

It is a rhizomatous geophyte native to temperate Asia, including China, Korea, Japan, and the Russian Far East.
