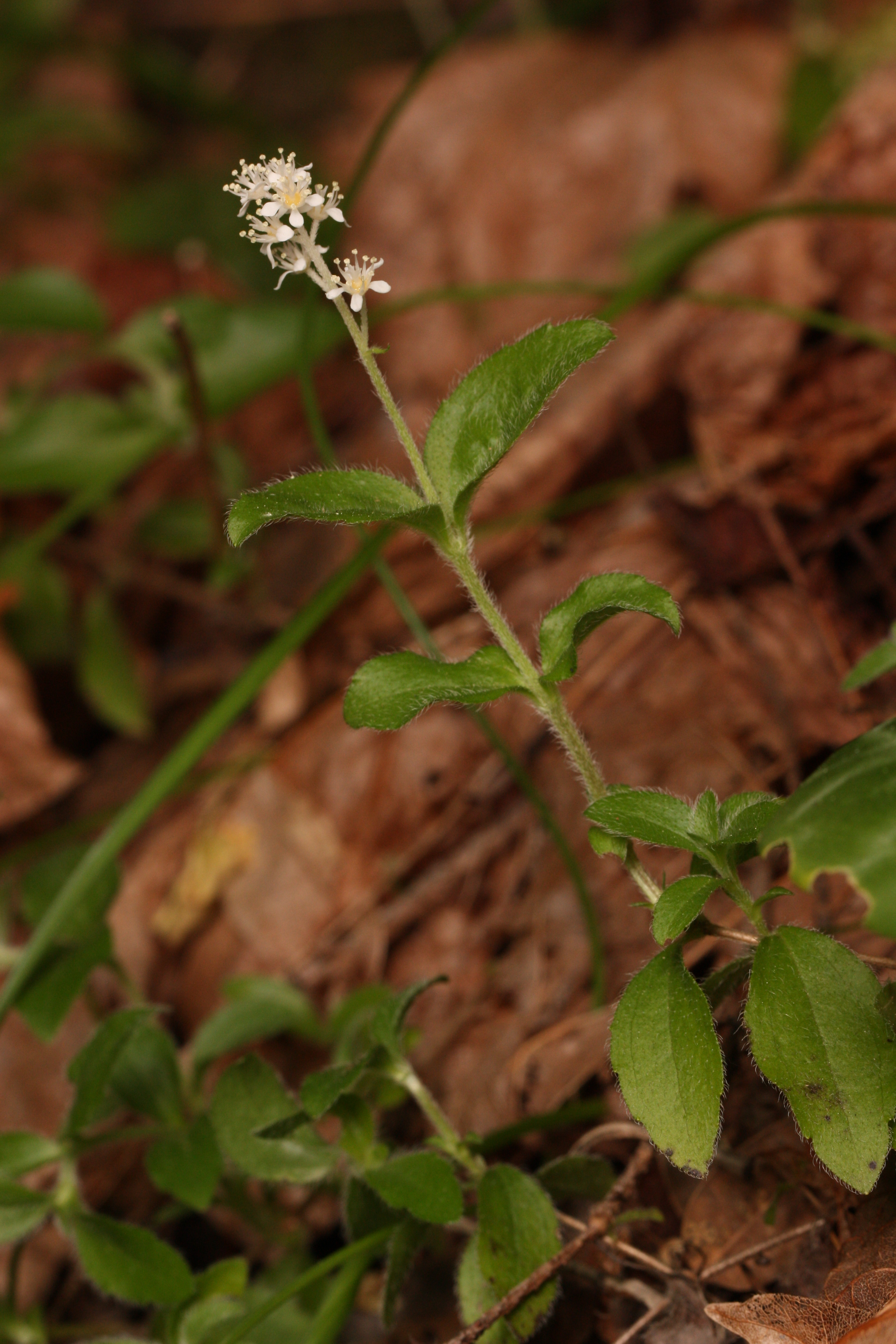

Scientific classification
- Kingdom: Plantae
- Clade: Tracheophytes
- Clade: Angiosperms
- Clade: Eudicots
- Clade: Asterids
- Order: Cornales
- Family: Hydrangeaceae
- Subfamily: Hydrangeoideae
- Tribe: Philadelpheae
- Genus: Whipplea; Torr.
- Species: W. modesta

Binomial name
- Whipplea modesta Torr.

= Whipplea =

Genus of flowering plants

Whipplea is a monotypic genus containing the single species Whipplea modesta, which is known by several common names including common whipplea, yerba de selva, and modesty. It is a dicot shrub or sub-shrub in the Hydrangeaceae family, native to the Pacific Coastal region of the United States.

Whipplea appears to have been first recorded in 1853 by the Scottish botanical explorer John Jeffrey in the Umpqua Valley near Mount Shasta, California, and named for Lieutenant Amiel Weeks Whipple (1817–1863), American surveyor and engineer.
