= Madrean region =

Floristic region in the Holarctic kingdom

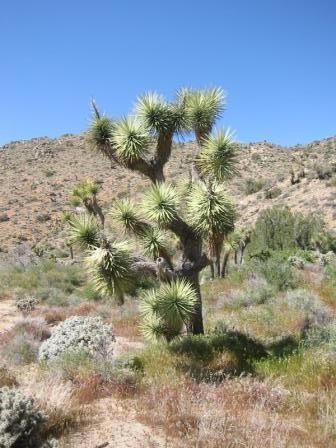
Yucca brevifolia in Joshua Tree National Park

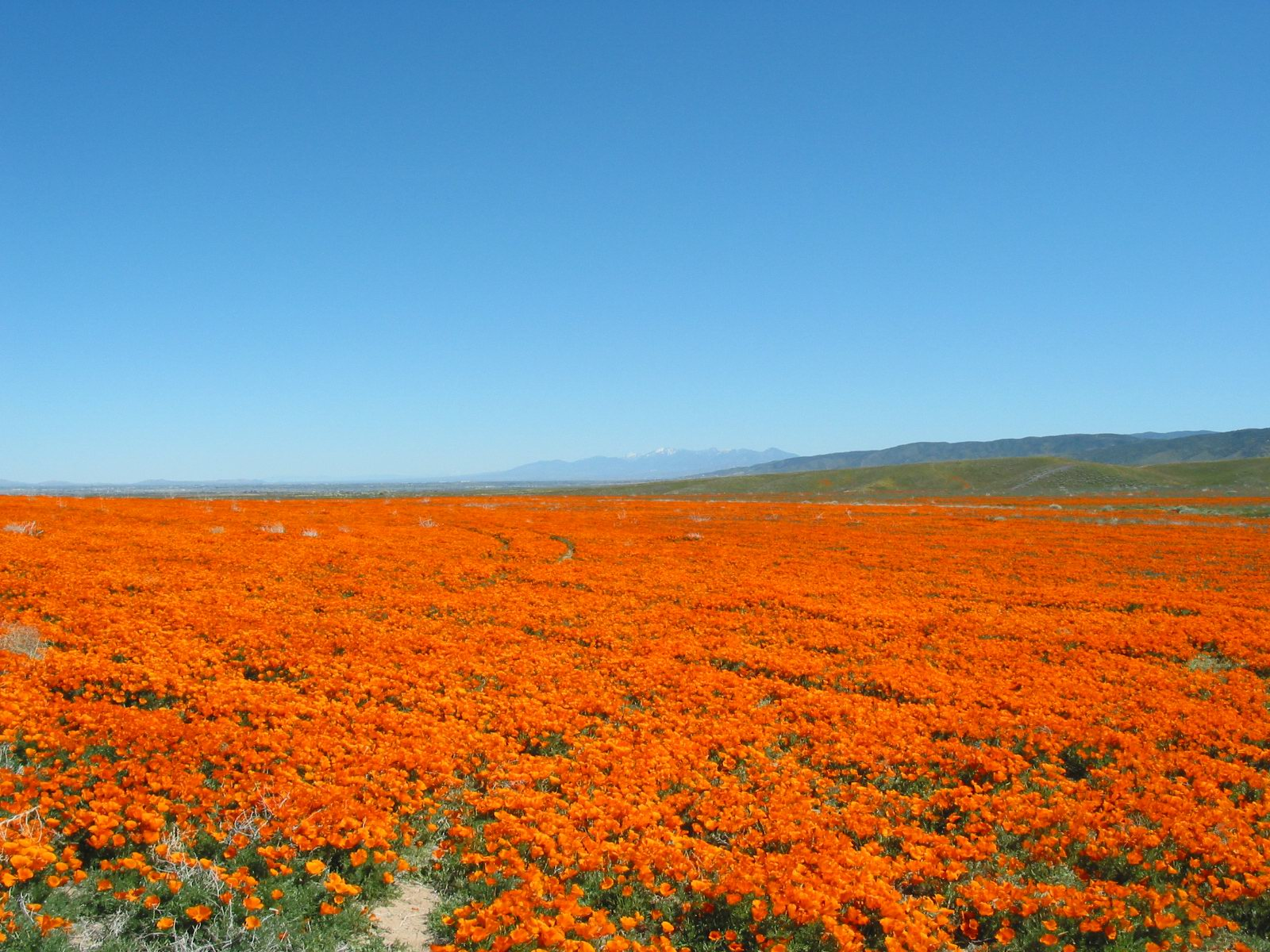
Eschscholzia californica in the Antelope Valley

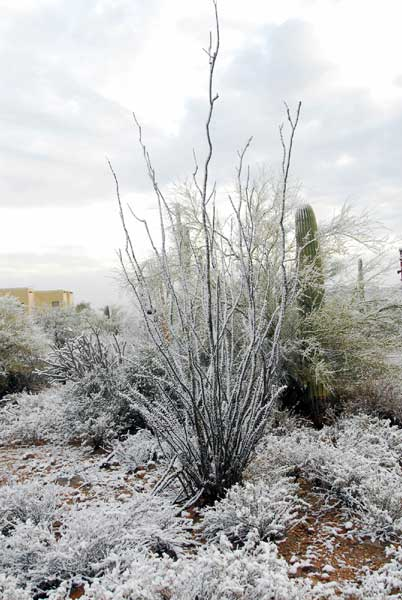
Fouquieria splendens in Tucson in winter

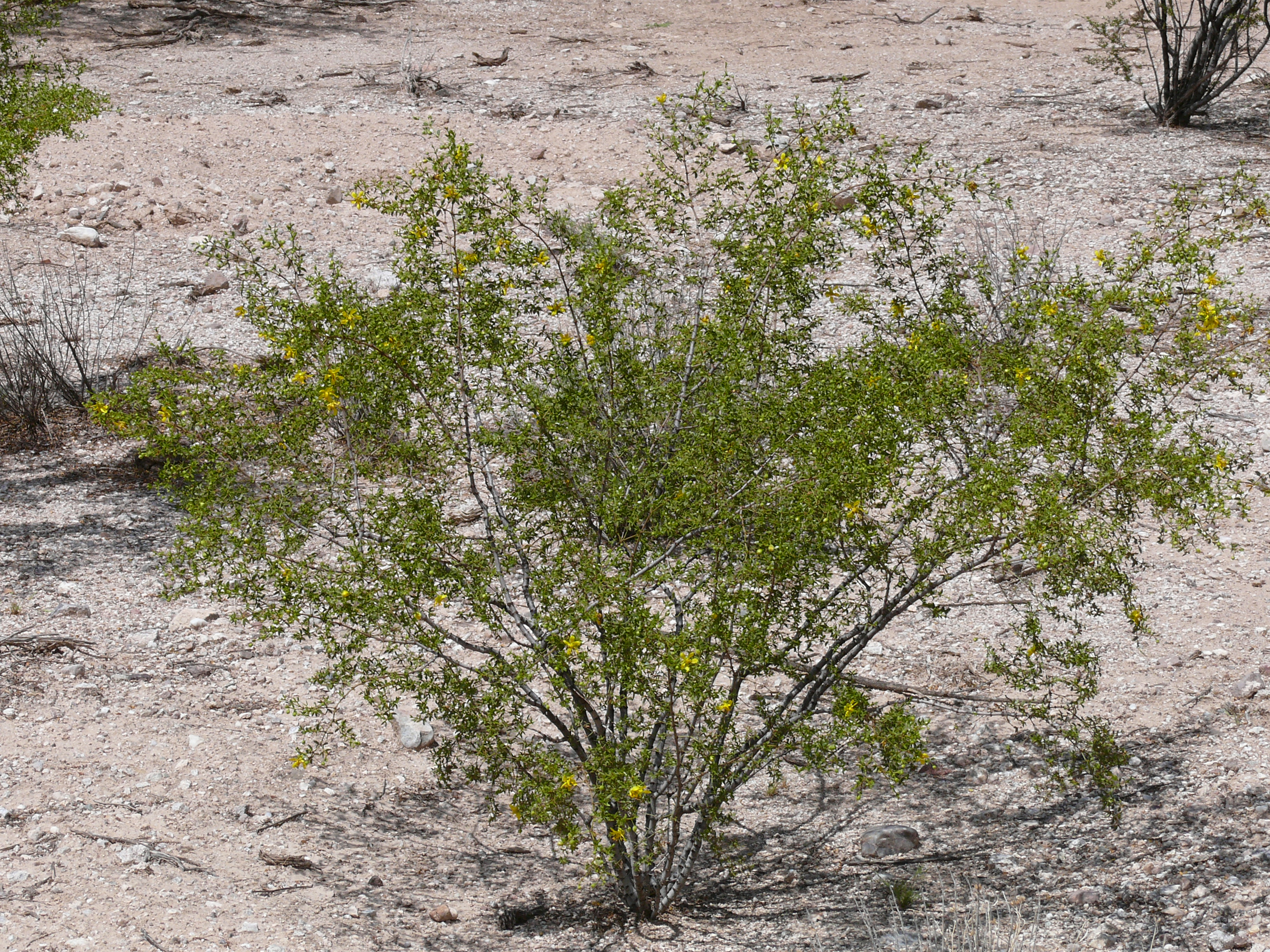
Young Larrea tridentata

The Madrean region (named after the Sierra Madre Occidental) is a floristic region within the Holarctic kingdom in North America, as delineated by Armen Takhtajan and Robert F. Thorne. It occupies arid or semiarid areas in the southwestern United States and northwestern Mexico and is bordered by the Rocky Mountain floristic region and North American Atlantic region of the Holarctic kingdom in the north and in the east, Caribbean region of the Neotropical kingdom in the south.

The Madrean region is characterized by a very distinct flora with at least three endemic families (Fouquieriaceae, Simmondsiaceae, and Setchellanthaceae). Crossosomataceae, Garryaceae, Lennoaceae, Limnanthaceae and Stegnospermataceae have their principal development here; for Onagraceae, Polemoniaceae and Hydrophyllaceae it is the major center of diversity. More than 250 genera and probably more than half of the species of the region are endemic to it according to Takhtajan.

== Floristic provinces ==
The region is subdivided into four floristic provinces:

- Great Basin province
- Californian province
- Sonoran province
- Mexican Highlands province

=== Great Basin province ===
The Great Basin floristic province includes most of the Great Basin, as well as the Colorado Plateau, the Snake River Plain, and Arizona north of the Mogollon Rim. It shares much of its flora with the neighboring provinces and has only a few endemic genera. Species endemism is also moderate (about 25%), but is much more considerable in such genera as Astragalus, Eriogonum, Penstemon, Cymopterus, Lomatium, Cryptantha, Chrysothamnus, Erigeron, Phacelia, Castilleja, and Gilia.

The vegetation in the central Great Basin shrub steppe part of the province is dominated by Artemisia species and Chenopodiaceae genera. The Great Basin montane forests include ancient Great Basin bristlecone pine (Pinus longaeva) trees.

=== Californian province ===
The Californian province occupies Central and Southern California from the seashore to the foothills of the Cascade Range, the Sierra Nevada range, and northern parts of Baja California in Mexico. It possesses the most diverse flora within the floristic region. About half of the species are endemic. More than 50 genera (e.g. Adenostoma, Bergerocactus, Carpenteria, Cneoridium, Dendromecon, Fremontodendron, Jepsonia, Lyonothamnus, Neostapfia, Odontostomum, Ornithostaphylos, Pickeringia, Romneya) are endemic or near-endemic as well. Arctostaphylos, Brodiaeinae, Calochortus, Caulanthus, Streptanthus, Ceanothus, Cryptantha, Downingia, Dudleya, Eritrichieae, Eriogonoideae, Gileae, Hydrophyllaceae, Limnanthaceae, Lotus, Madiinae, Mimulus, Onagreae, Epilobieae, Orcuttieae, Eschscholzioideae, Platystemonoideae, Astragalus and Cupressus have a principal center of diversity within the province. The flora of the Californian Province is partially shared with the spatially distant Chile-Patagonian region of the Antarctic kingdom and to a lesser extent Mediterranean region of the Holarctic kingdom. The vegetation of the Californian Province is varied. Wetter northern parts of the Californian province (Northern California and Oregon) as defined by Peter Raven and D.I. Axelrod, as well as by Conservation International, fall under the Rocky Mountain region in Takhtajan and Thorne's system and are not parts of the Madrean region.

=== Sonoran province ===
The Sonoran province comprises arid areas in the southwestern U.S. and northwestern Mexico from California and Baja California to Texas and Tamaulipas, including the Mojave (characterized by Yucca brevifolia, Joshua Tree), Sonora and Chihuahua Deserts. The vegetation is dominated by Yucca, Cactaceae species (Opuntia spp. and other), as well as by Larrea tridentata (Creosote bush).

=== Mexican Highlands province ===
The Mexican Highlands province comprises areas in the Mexican Plateau region, including Madrean pine-oak woodlands.

== See also ==
- Madrean Sky Islands

== Bibliography ==
- Thorne, Robert F. Phytogeography of North America North of Mexico. Flora of North America, Vol. 1, Ch. 6.
