= Phytochorion =

Geographic area with a relatively uniform composition of plant species

In phytogeography, a phytochorion is a geographic area with a relatively uniform composition of plant species. Adjacent phytochoria do not usually have a sharp boundary, but rather a soft one, a transitional area in which many species from both regions overlap, called a vegetation tension zone, or ecotone.

In traditional schemes, areas in phytogeography are classified hierarchically, according to the presence of endemic families, genera or species, e.g., in floral (or floristic, phytogeographic) zones and regions, or also in kingdoms, regions and provinces, sometimes including the categories empire and domain. However, some authors prefer not to rank areas, referring to them simply as "areas", "regions" (in a non hierarchical sense) or "phytochoria".

Systems used to classify vegetation can be divided in two major groups: those that use physiognomic-environmental parameters and characteristics and those that are based on floristic (i.e., shared genera and species) relationships. Phytochoria are defined by their plant taxonomic composition, while other schemes of regionalization (e.g., vegetation type, physiognomy, plant formations, biomes) may variably take in account, depending on the author, the apparent characteristics of a community (the dominant life-form), environment characteristics, the fauna associated, anthropic factors or political-conservationist issues.

== Explanation ==
Several systems of classifying geographic areas where plants grow have been devised. Most systems are organized hierarchically, with the largest units subdivided into smaller geographic areas, which are made up of smaller floristic communities, and so on. Phytochoria are defined as areas possessing a large number of endemic taxa. Floristic kingdoms are characterized by a high degree of family endemism, floristic regions by a high degree of generic endemism, and floristic provinces by a high degree of species endemism. Systems of phytochoria have both significant similarities and differences with zoogeographic provinces, which follow the composition of mammal families, and with biogeographical provinces or terrestrial ecoregions, which take into account both plant and animal species.

The term "phytochorion" (Werger & van Gils, 1976) is especially associated with the classifications according to the methodology of Josias Braun-Blanquet, which is tied to the presence or absence of particular species, mainly in Africa.

Taxonomic databases tend to be organized in ways which approximate floristic provinces, but which are more closely aligned to political boundaries, for example according to the World Geographical Scheme for Recording Plant Distributions.

== Early schemes ==
In the late 19th century, Adolf Engler (1844-1930) was the first to make a world map with the limits of distribution of floras, with four major floral regions (realms). His Syllabus der Pflanzenfamilien, from the third edition (1903) onwards, also included a sketch of the division of the earth into floral regions.

Other important early works on floristics includes Augustin de Candolle (1820), Schouw (1823), Alphonse de Candolle (1855), Drude (1890), Diels (1908), and Rikli (1913).

== Good (1947) regionalization ==
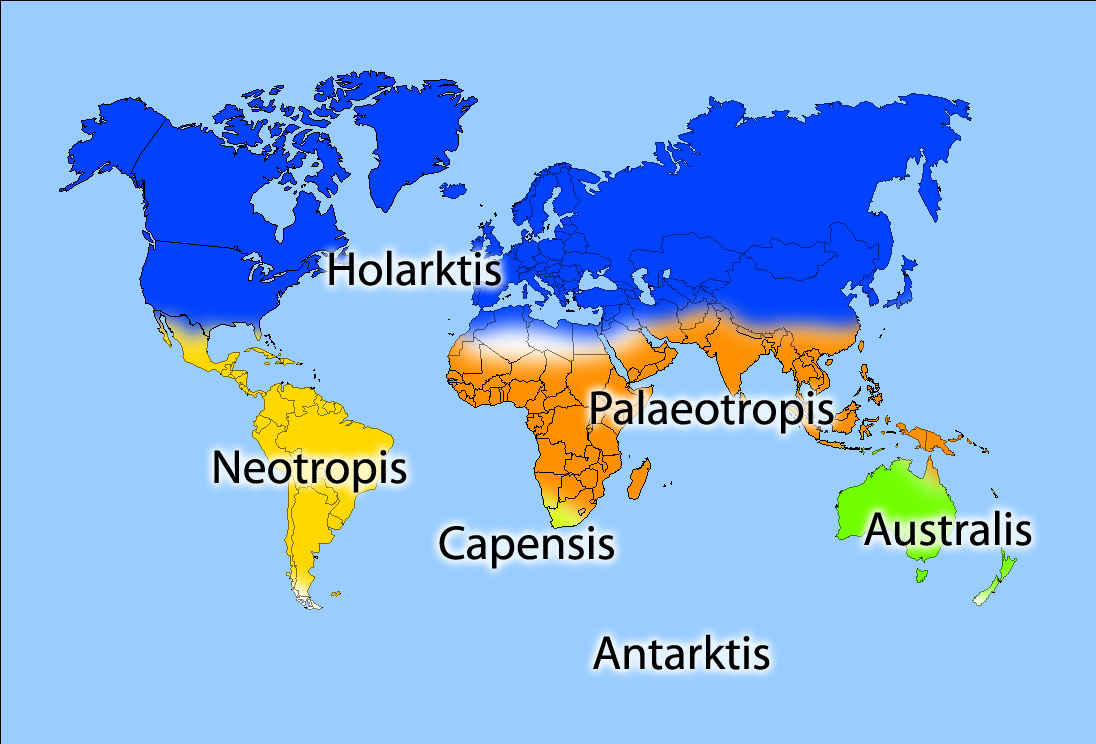
Good (1947) floristic kingdoms

Botanist Ronald Good (1947) identified six floristic kingdoms (Boreal or Holarctic, Neotropical, Paleotropical, South African, Australian, and Antarctic), the largest natural units he determined for flowering plants. Good's six kingdoms are subdivided into smaller units, called regions and provinces. The Paleotropical kingdom is divided into three subkingdoms, which are each subdivided into floristic regions. Each of the other five kingdoms are subdivided directly into regions. There are a total of 37 floristic regions. Almost all regions are further subdivided into floristic provinces.

== Takhtajan (1978, 1986) regionalization ==
Armen Takhtajan (1978, 1986), in a widely used scheme that builds on Good's work, identified thirty-five floristic regions, each of which is subdivided into floristic provinces, of which there are 152 in all.

=== Holarctic kingdom ===
==== I. Circumboreal region ====
1 Arctic province
2 Atlantic Europe province
3 Central Europe province
4 Illyria or Balkan province
5 Pontus Euxinus province
6 Caucasus province
7 Eastern Europe province
8 Northern Europe province
9 Western Siberia province
10 Altai-Sayan province
11 Central Siberia province
12 Transbaikalia province
13 Northeastern Siberia province
14 Okhotsk-Kamchatka province
15 Canada incl. Great Lakes province

==== II. Eastern Asiatic region ====
16 Manchuria province
17 Sakhalin-Hokkaidō province
18 Japan-Korea province
19 Volcano-Bonin province
20 Ryūkyū or Tokara-Okinawa province
21 Taiwan province
22 Northern China province
23 Central China province
24 Southeastern China province
25 Sikang-Yuennan province
26 Northern Burma province
27 Eastern Himalaya province
28 Khasi-Manipur province

==== III. North American Atlantic region ====
29 Appalachian province (forested areas extending east to include the piedmont and west to the start of the prairies)
30 Atlantic and Gulf Coastal Plain province
31 North American Prairies province

==== IV. Rocky Mountain region ====
32 Vancouverian province
33 Rocky Mountains province

==== V. Macaronesian region ====
34 Azores province
35 Madeira province
36 Canaries province
37 Cape Verde province

==== VI. Mediterranean region ====
38 Southern Morocco province
39 Southwestern Mediterranean province
40 South Mediterranean province
41 Iberia province
42 Baleares province
43 Liguria-Tyrrhenia province
44 Adriatic province
45 East Mediterranean province
46 Crimea-Novorossijsk province

==== VII. Saharo-Arabian region ====
47 Sahara province
48 Egypt-Arabia province

==== VIII. Irano-Turanian region ====
===== 8A. Western Asiatic subregion =====
49 Mesopotamia province
50 Central Anatolia province
51 Armenia-Iran province
52 Hyrcania province
53 Turania or Aralo-Caspia province
54 Turkestan province
55 Northern Baluchistan province
56 Western Himalaya province

===== 8B. Central Asiatic subregion =====
57 Central Tien Shan province
58 Dzungaria-Tien Shan province
59 Mongolia province
60 Tibet province

==== IX. Madrean region ====
61 Great Basin province
62 Californian province
63 Sonoran province
64 Mexican Highlands province

=== Paleotropical kingdom ===
==== X. Guineo-Congolian region ====
65 Upper Guinean forests province
66 Nigeria-Cameroon province
67 Congo province

==== XI. Usambara-Zululand region ====
68 Zanzibar-Inhambane province
69 Tongoland-Pondoland province

==== XII. Sudano-Zambezian region ====
===== 12A. Zambezian subregion =====
70 Zambezi province

===== 12B. Sahelo–Sudanian subregion =====
71 Sahel province
72 Sudan province

===== 12C. Eritreo–Arabian subregion =====
73 Somalia-Ethiopia province
74 South Arabia province
75 Socotra province

===== 12D. Omano-Sindian subregion =====
76 Oman province
77 South Iran province
78 Sindia province

==== XIII. Karoo-Namib region ====
79 Namibia province
80 Namaland province
81 Western Cape province
82 Karoo province

==== XIV. St. Helena and Ascension region ====
83 St. Helena and Ascension province

==== XV. Madagascan region ====
84 Eastern Madagascar province
85 Western Madagascar province
86 Southern and Southwestern Madagascar province
87 Comoro province
88 Mascarenes province
89 Seychelles province

==== XVI. Indian region ====
90 Ceylon (Sri Lanka) province
91 Malabar province
92 Deccan province
93 Upper Gangetic Plain province
94 Bengal province

==== XVII. Indochinese region ====
95 South Burma province
96 Andamans province
97 South China province
98 Thailand province
99 North Indochina province
100 Annam province
101 South Indochina province

==== XVIII. Malesian region ====
===== 18A. Malesian subregion =====
102 Malaya province
103 Borneo province
104 Philippines province
105 Sumatra province
106 Java province

===== 18B. Papuan subregion =====
107 Celebes province
108 Moluccas and West New Guinea province
109 Papua province
110 Bismarck Archipelago province

==== XIX. Fijian region ====
111 New Hebrides province
112 Fiji province

==== XX. Polynesian region ====
113 Micronesia province
114 Polynesia province

==== XXI. Hawaiian region ====
115 Hawaii province

==== XXII. Neocaledonian region ====
116 New Caledonia province

=== Neotropical kingdom ===
==== XXIII. Caribbean region ====
117 Central America province
118 West Indies province
119 Galápagos Islands province

==== XXIV. Region of the Guayana Highlands ====
120 The Guianas province

==== XXV. Amazon region ====
121 Amazonia province
122 Llanos province

==== XXVI. Brazilian region ====
123 Caatinga province
124 Central Brazilian Uplands province
125 Chaco province
126 Atlantic province
127 Paraná province

==== XXVII. Andean region ====
128 Northern Andes province
129 Central Andes province

=== South African kingdom ===
==== XXVIII. Cape region ====
130 Cape province

=== Australian kingdom ===
==== XXIX. Northeast Australian region ====
131 North Australia province
132 Queensland province
133 Southeast Australia province
134 Tasmania province

==== XXX. Southwest Australian region ====
135 Southwest Australia province

==== XXXI. Central Australian or Eremaean region ====
136 Eremaea province

=== Antarctic kingdom ===
==== XXXII. Fernandezian region ====
137 Juan Fernández province

==== XXXIII. Chile-Patagonian region ====
138 Northern Chile province
139 Central Chile province
140 Pampas province
141 Patagonia province
142 Tierra del Fuego province

==== XXXIV. Region of the South Subantarctic Islands ====
143 Tristan-Gough province
144 Kerguelen province

==== XXXV. Neozeylandic region ====
145 Lord Howe province
146 Norfolk province
147 Kermadec province
148 Northern New Zealand province
149 Central New Zealand province
150 Southern New Zealand province
151 Chatham province
152 New Zealand Subantarctic Islands province

== Regionalization according to Wolfgang Frey and Rainer Lösch (2004, 2010) ==
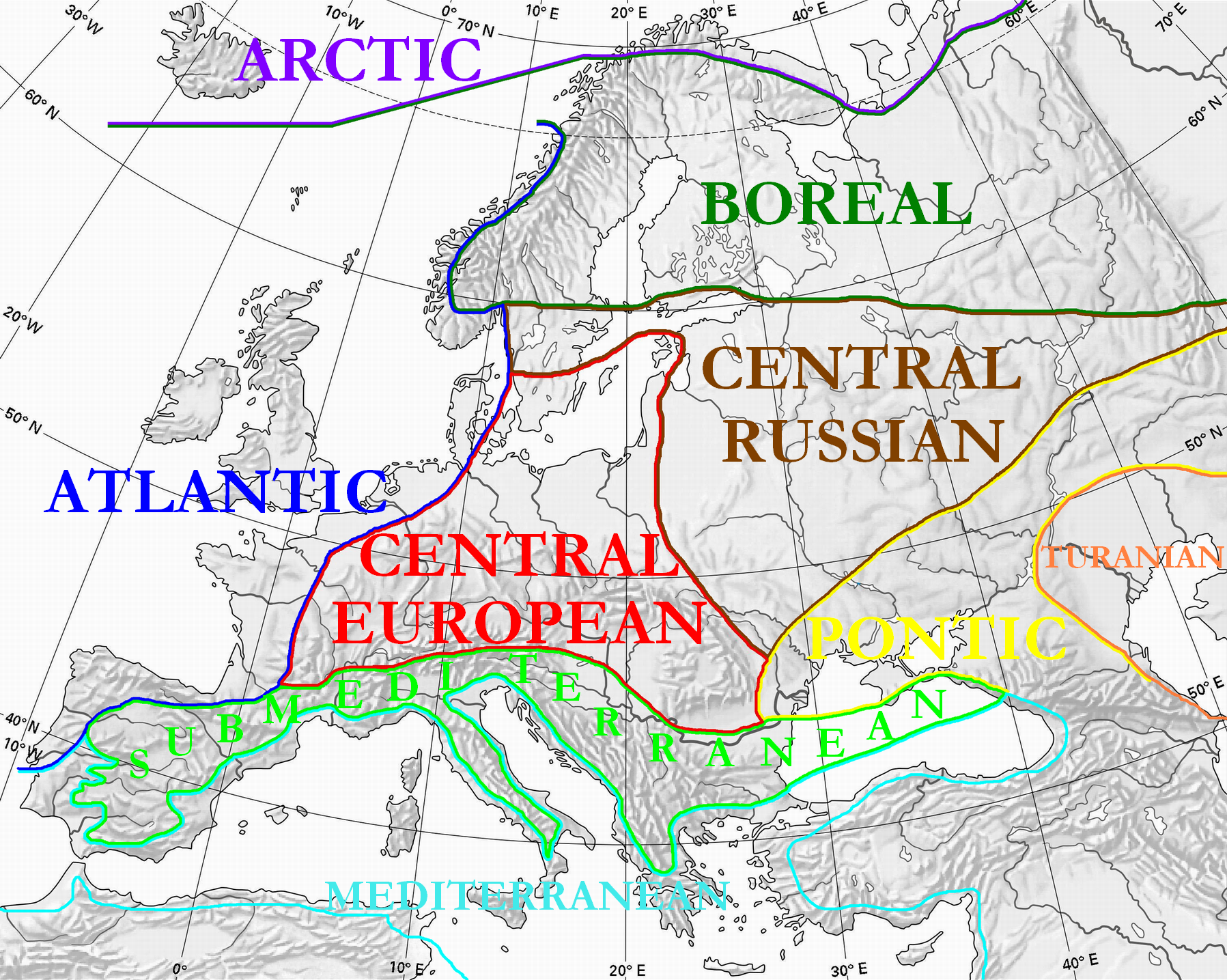
Flora regions in Europe

Notes
(with focus on Europe, matching the image on the right)

- The central European region and the central Russian region are sister regions.
- The border between them is similar to the Fagus sylvatica limit (January, day-time temperature average: above -2 °C).
- The border between the central Russian region and the boreal region is similar to the Quercus spp. limit (Day-time temperature average: above 10 °C, 4 months per year).
- The border between the boreal region and the arctic region is similar to the tree line, taiga/arctic tundra limit (July, day-time temperature average: above 10 °C).
- The border of the Atlantic region is the limit of no frost (average), Gulf Stream influence.
- The warm islands in the Atlantic Ocean are in the Macaronesia region: isolated populations in a more humid environment.
- The Mediterranean region is similar to the occurrence of wild Olea europaea and wild Cistus salviifolius (Olea europaea is grown very North in Italy).
- The border between the submediterranean region and the central European region is similar to the alpine arc (upper Rhone, upper Rhine, lower Danube), a weather barrier.
- The Pontic region border is similar to the tree line/ steppe limit (less than 450 mm precipitation per year).
- The Turanian region has a semi-arid climate.

== Liu et al. (2023, 2024) regionalization ==
Critiquing previous attempts for their lack of phylogenetic relationships in the construction of their regions, Liu et al. incorporated distribution data alongside phylogenetic relationships to configure their realms. This led to the classification of eight realms organized into two super-realms and each composed of a number of sub-realms.

- Gondwanan super-realm

1 African
2 Indo-Malesian
3 Australian
4 Novozealandic
5 Neotropical
6 Chile–Patagonian

- Laurasian super-realm

7 Holarctic
8 Saharo-Arabian

Differences from Takhtajan's floristic kingdoms mainly focus on emphasizing the uniqueness of certain realms that he had as subdivisions within kingdoms. Two examples are separating some kingdoms into two separate realms, as happened to the Paleotropical and Antarctic kingdoms, reasoning that they have been separated form each other for long enough time to constitute a different phylogenetic trajectory. The merging of the Cape floristic kingdom with the African realm was based by the low endemism of higher taxonomic ranks, which could be found outside the cape region in the rest of Africa. The final major change is the separation of the Saharo-Arabian realm from the Holarctic kingdom, though they admit the northern boundary is not clear, with flora from the Holarctic being found within this area.

After publishing their regions, Dr. Hong Qian criticized Liu et al. for the inclusion of nonnative distributions in their analyses. In response to this, the group cleaned their data to remove nonnative ranges and reassessed their regions. They suggest that the previous inclusion of exotic species did not significantly affect their mapping and found that the cleaned data revealed the same floristic realms.

== Bibliography ==
- Frodin, D.G. (2001). Guide to Standard Floras of the World. An annotated, geographically arranged systematic bibliography of the principal floras, enumerations, checklists and chorological atlases of different areas. 2nd ed. (1st edn 1984), pp. xxiv, 1100, .Cambridge University Press, Cambridge, .
