= Great Basin floristic province =

Floristic province in the Western United States

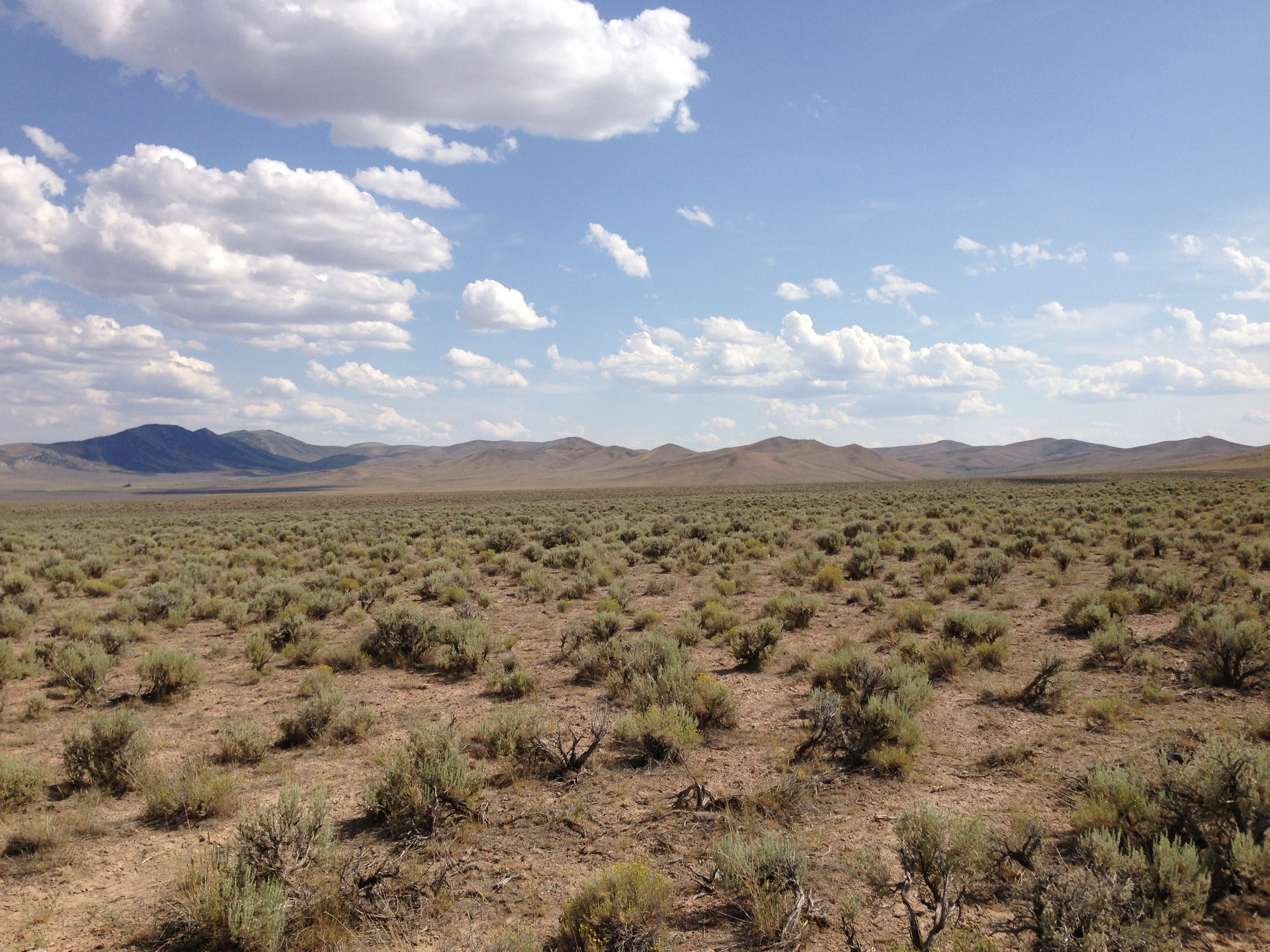
Sagebrush is indicative of the Great Basin floristic province

The Great Basin Province is a floristic province of the Madrean floristic region, in the Boreal floristic kingdom. It is located in the Western United States.

A floristic province (or phytochorion) is a concept defined by Ronald Good, in 1947, and refined by Armen Takhtajan, in 1986. A phytochorion is a region on earth that has a relative constant composition of plants. Takhtajan defined the Great Basin floristic province to extend well beyond the boundaries of the hydrographically defined Great Basin: it includes the Snake River Plain, the Colorado Plateau, the Uinta Basin, and parts of Arizona north of the Mogollon Rim. The Great Basin phytochorion is distinguished by the presence of Great Basin sagebrush (Artemisia tridentata), and saltbushes in genus Atriplex.

The Great Basin floristic province is one geographical division scheme for the Intermountain West, amongst many. Other classifications are proposed by the U.S. Environmental Protection Agency (i.e., the Central Basin and Range ecoregion and the Northern Basin and Range ecoregion), and by the World Wildlife Fund (i.e., Great Basin shrub steppe and Great Basin montane forests)

The larger deserts of the Great Basin province are: the Great Basin Desert (39,505 square miles (102,320 km^{2}) in Nevada; and the Great Salt Lake Desert (4,000 square miles (10,000 km^{2}) and Escalante Desert (3,270 square miles (8,500 km^{2}) in Utah.
