= Phlox oklahomensis =

Scientific classification
- Kingdom: Plantae
- Clade: Tracheophytes
- Clade: Angiosperms
- Clade: Eudicots
- Clade: Asterids
- Order: Ericales
- Family: Polemoniaceae
- Genus: Phlox
- Species: P. oklahomensis

Binomial name
- Phlox oklahomensis Wherry

Species of flowering plant

Phlox oklahomensis, the Oklahoma phlox, is a species of flowering plant in the family Polemoniaceae. It can be found in the prairies of Kansas, Oklahoma and Texas.
