= Boreal kingdom =

Floristic kingdom in northern Eurasia and the Americas

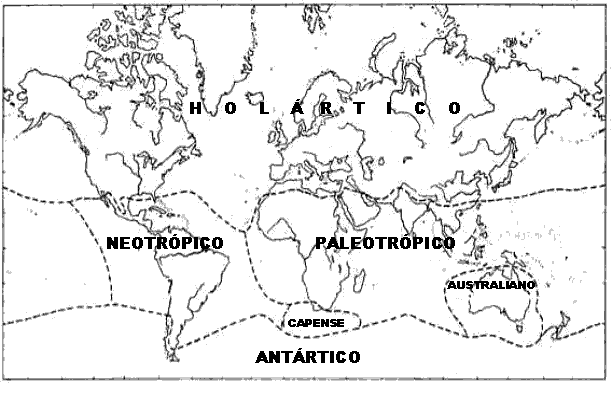
The Holarctic kingdom

The Boreal kingdom or Holarctic kingdom (Holarctis) is a floristic kingdom identified (1947) by botanist Ronald Good (and later by Armen Takhtajan), which includes the temperate to Arctic portions of North America, Eurasia and North Africa. Its flora is inherited from the ancient supercontinent of Laurasia. However, parts of the floristic kingdom (and most of its Circumboreal Region) were glaciated during the Pleistocene and as a consequence have a very young flora. Cenozoic relicts found refuge in the southern and mountainous parts of the kingdom, especially in the Eastern Asiatic Region and southern North American Atlantic Region.

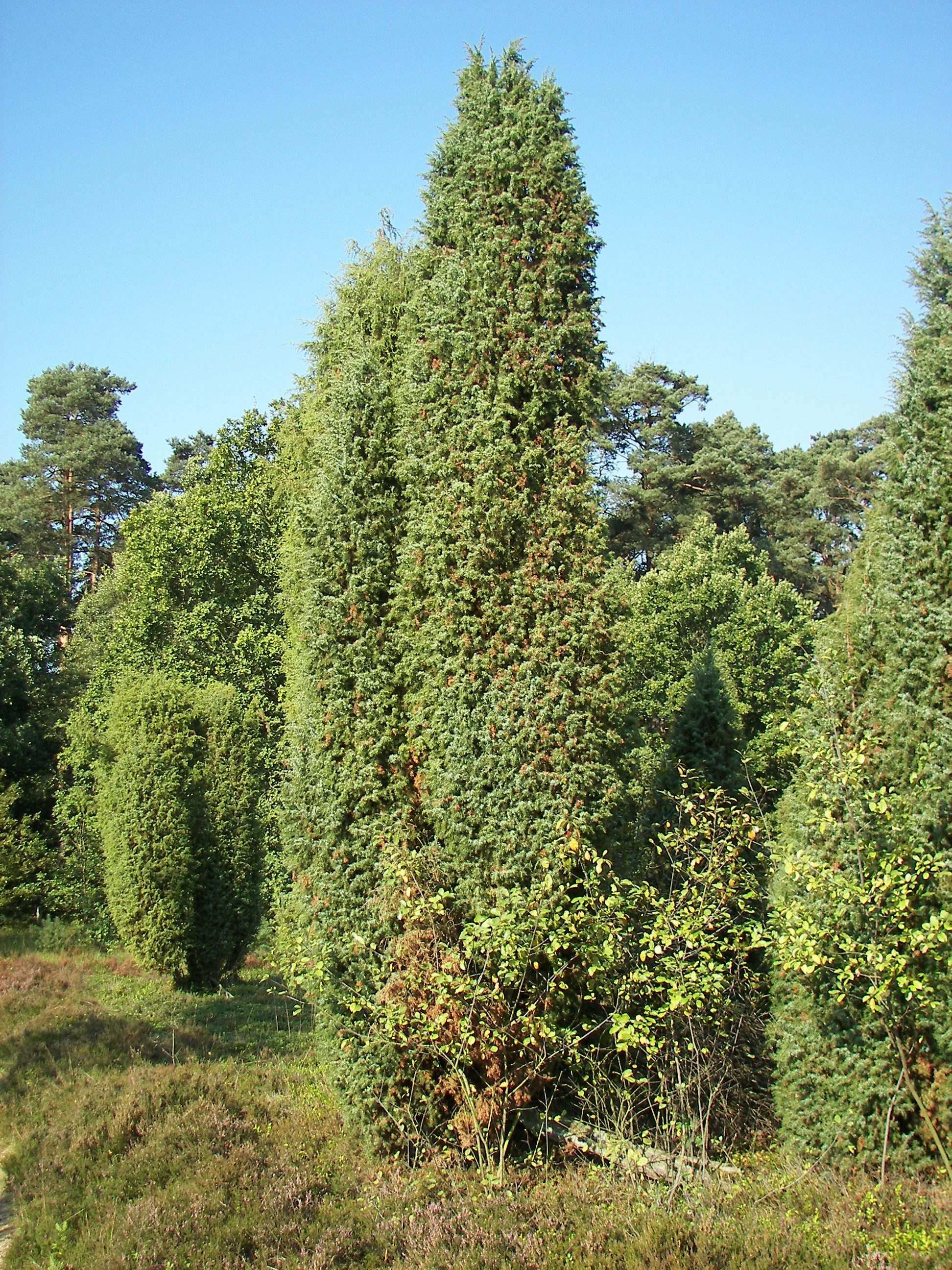
Juniperus communis on Lüneburg Heath in Germany

Good noted that many plant species of temperate North America and Eurasia were very closely related, despite their separation by the Atlantic Ocean and the Bering Strait.

Millions of years ago, before the opening of the Atlantic Ocean, North America and Eurasia were joined as a single continent, Laurasia. After the opening of the Atlantic, the continents were connected to one another periodically via a land bridge known as Beringia. Until a few million years ago, the global climate was warmer than at present, especially at higher latitudes, and many temperate climate species were distributed across North America and Eurasia via Alaska and Siberia. The sharply cooler climate of the past few million years eliminated a temperate-zone connection between North America and Eurasia, but common Laurasian origins and a long history of temperate-climate land bridges account for the botanical similarities between the temperate floras on the two continents.

A floristic kingdom is the botanical analogue to an biogeographic realm, which takes into account the distribution of animal as well as plant species. Many biogeographers distinguish the Boreal kingdom as comprising two realms, the Nearctic (North America) and Palearctic (North Africa and Eurasia). Others, based on the distribution of related plant and animal families, include the Palearctic and Nearctic in a single Holarctic realm, which corresponds to Good's Boreal kingdom.

== Flora ==
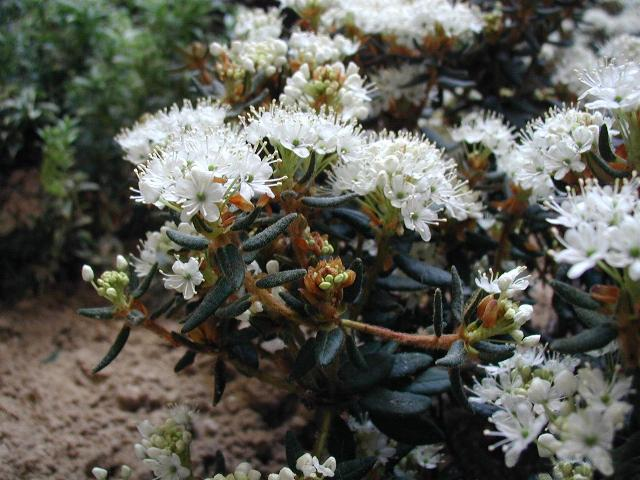
Rhododendron tomentosum

According to Takhtajan (1978), the following families are endemic to this kingdom: Ginkgoaceae, Cephalotaxaceae, Glaucidiaceae, Hydrastidaceae (Hydrastis), Trochodendraceae, Tetracentraceae, Cercidiphyllaceae, Euptelaceae (Euptelea), Platanaceae, Eucommiaceae, Rhoipteleaceae, Leitneriaceae, Paeoniaceae, Crossosomataceae, Stachyuraceae, Fouquieriaceae, Diapensiaceae, Simmondsiaceae, Pterostemonaceae, Penthoraceae, Bretschneideraceae, Limnanthaceae, Davidiaceae (Davidia), Toricelliaceae, Helwingiaceae, Theligonaceae, Dipentodontaceae, Cynomoriaceae, Adoxaceae, Trapellaceae (Trapella), Butomaceae, Scheuchzeriaceae, Aphyllanthaceae.

According to the same author, the following families are well represented: Magnoliaceae, Lauraceae, Ranunculaceae, Berberidaceae, Hamamelidaceae, Fagaceae, Betulaceae, Juglandaceae, Caryophyllaceae, Chenopodiaceae, Polygonaceae, Plumbaginaceae, Theaceae, Salicaceae, Brassicaceae, Ericaceae, Primulaceae, Malvaceae, Euphorbiaceae, Thymelaeaceae, Rosaceae, Fabaceae, Cornaceae, Araliaceae, Apiaceae, Rhamnaceae, Gentianaceae, Boraginaceae, Scrophulariaceae, Lamiaceae, Campanulaceae, Asteraceae, Liliaceae, Iridaceae, Orchidaceae, Juncaceae, Cyperaceae, Poaceae, Pinaceae, Cupressaceae, Aspleniaceae, Polypodiaceae.

== Subdivisions ==
The kingdom is subdivided into three floristic subkingdoms and nine floristic regions.

=== Boreal subkingdom ===
- Circumboreal region
- Eastern Asiatic region
- North American Atlantic region
- Rocky Mountain region

=== Tethyan subkingdom ===
- Macaronesian region
- Mediterranean region
- Saharo-Arabian region
- Irano-Turanian region

=== Madrean floristic region ===
- Madrean region
