= List of alismatid families =

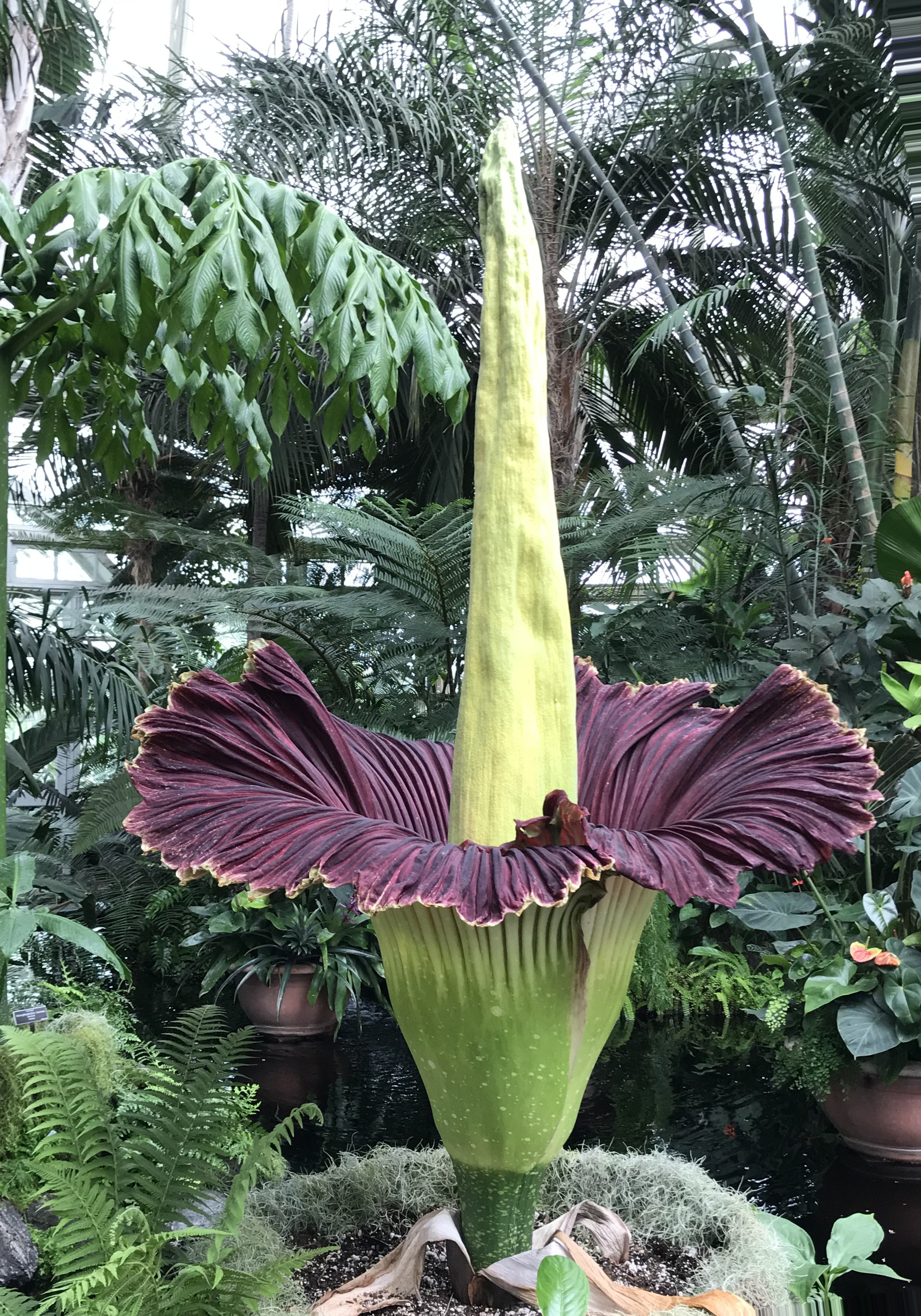
Titan arum

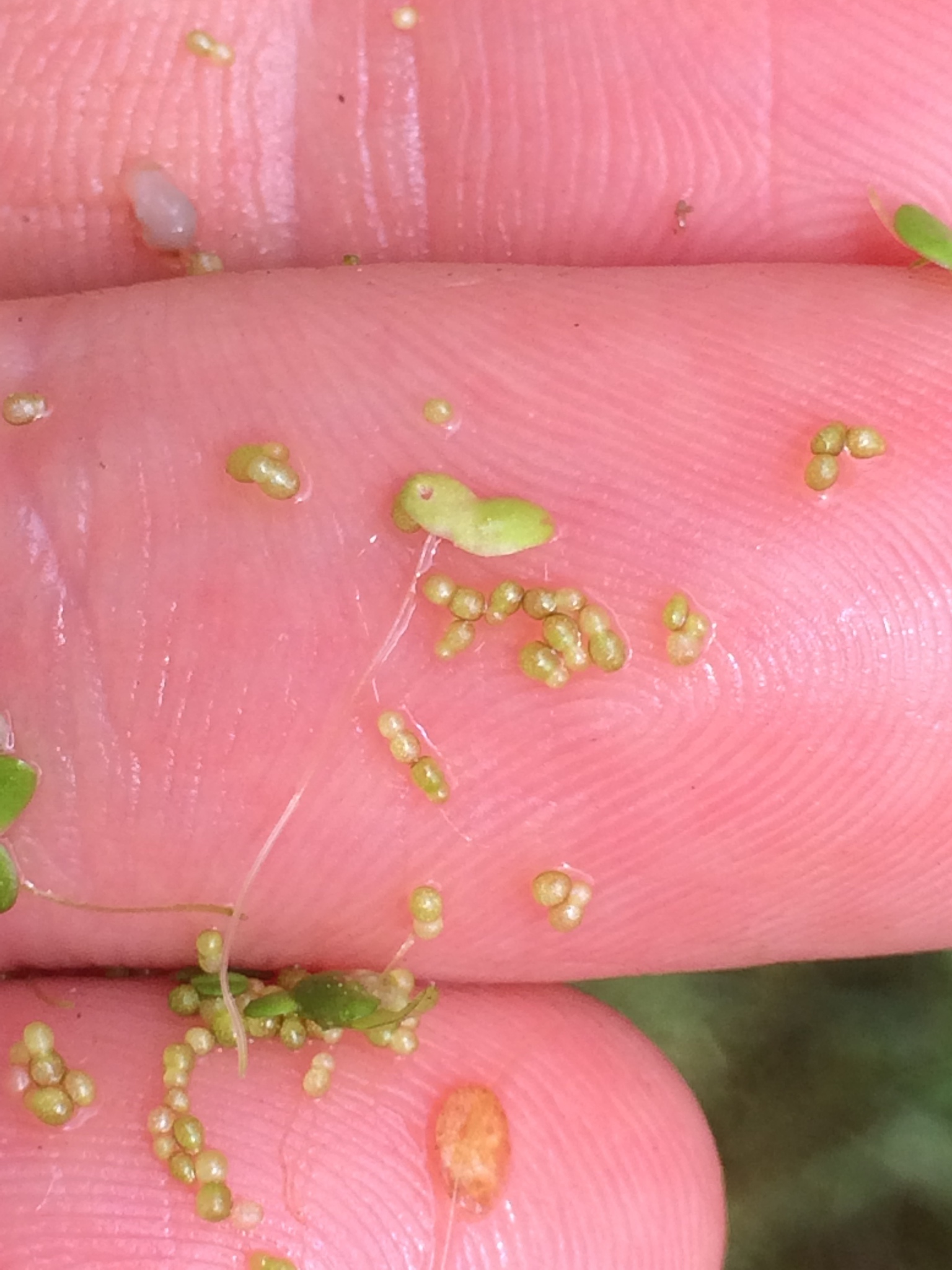
Duckweed; each speck is an individual plant.

The alismatid monocots are a group of 15 interrelated families of flowering plants, named for their largest order, Alismatales. (Note: The taxonomy (classification) in this list follows Plants of the World (2017) and the fourth Angiosperm Phylogeny Group system. Total counts of genera for each family come from Plants of the World Online. (See the POWO license.) Extinct taxa are not included. The monocots as a whole are the plants responsible for most of the global agricultural output, including those in the grass, palm, banana, ginger, asparagus, pineapple, sedge and onion families.) Like other monocots, they usually have a single embryonic leaf (cotyledon) in their seeds, scattered vascular systems, leaves with parallel veins, flowers with parts in threes or multiples of three, and roots that can develop in more than one place along the stems. The alismatids have adapted to thrive in oceans, temperate zones, deserts, the tropics, and even glacial regions.

Like the earliest monocots, many of the alismatid monocots are aquatic, and some grow completely submerged. Apart from the sweet-flag family of wetlands plants, all the alismatid families are in Alismatales. Some of the plants in this order are invasive aquatic weeds that can disrupt and destabilize ecosystems. Others grow in a variety of habitats, especially plants in the aroid family. This family includes the titan arum, with the world's largest unbranched inflorescence, and also the world's smallest flowering plant, duckweed.

== Glossary ==
From the glossary of botanical terms:

- annual: a plant species that completes its life cycle within a single year or growing season
- basal: attached close to the base (of a plant or an evolutionary tree diagram)
- climber: a vine that leans on, twines around or clings to other plants for vertical support
- herbaceous: not woody; usually green and soft in texture
- perennial: not an annual or biennial
- woody: hard and lignified; not herbaceous

The APG IV system is the fourth in a series of plant taxonomies from the Angiosperm Phylogeny Group. In this system, the alismatids are basal within the monocots.

== Alismatid families ==
Alismatid families
Family and a common name (Note: Each family's formal name ends in the Latin suffix -aceae and is derived from the name of a genus that is or once was part of the family.)	Type genus and etymology (Note: Some plants were named for naturalists (unless otherwise noted).)	Total genera; global distribution	Description and uses	Order	Type genus images
Acoraceae (sweet-flag family)	Acorus comes from a Latin plant name.	1 genus, in North America, Europe and Asia	Herbaceous aromatic plants with thin, sword-shaped leaves. The rhizomes are essentially non-vascular.	Acorales	Acorus calamus
Alismataceae (water-plantain family)	Alisma comes from a Greek plant name.	18 genera, worldwide	Herbaceous latex-bearing aquatic plants, usually perennials. They take root in freshwater beds, and some remain submerged. Two species are consumed in Asia, and another was a food source for Native Americans. C_{4} photosynthesis (Note: See Photosynthesis#C3 : C4 photosynthesis research for the chemistry of C_{4} photosynthesis.) has been observed in Sagittaria.	Alismatales	Alisma plantago-aquatica
Aponogetonaceae (waterblommetjie family)	Aponogeton is from the Latin for "near (the hot springs at) Aponus".	1 genus, in Africa, Oceania, and South and Southeast Asia	Herbaceous smooth-stemmed freshwater perennials, usually with long leaf-stalks. Cape pondweed flowers are consumed as a delicacy in South Africa; the tubers are also edible.	Alismatales	Aponogeton distachyos
Araceae (aroid family)	Arum comes from a Greek plant name.	142 genera, worldwide, especially in the tropics	Generally sappy, herbaceous plants growing in soil, in water and on trees, along with a few woody climbers. Many cultures have relied on taro plants (which are toxic when raw) as a staple crop.	Alismatales	Arum maculatum
Butomaceae (flowering-rush family)	Butomus is from the Greek for "ox-wounding", named for the sharp leaves.	1 genus, in temperate Europe and Asia	Smooth-stemmed herbaceous aquatic, swamp or marsh plants, usually with milky latex. They are consumed in parts of Russia, in bread or as a vegetable.	Alismatales	Butomus umbellatus
Cymodoceaceae (turtle-grass family)	Cymodocea was named for Cymodoce, a Greek sea nymph.	6 genera, in tropical and warm temperate seas	Large perennials, up to 30 cm (12 in) long in the genus Cymodocea. They nourish and shelter many crustaceans and fish that are harvested commercially.	Alismatales	Cymodocea nodosa
Hydrocharitaceae (frogbit family)	Hydrocharis is from the Greek for "water grace".	14 genera, worldwide	Annual and perennial aquatic plants. One species is consumed in Asia. Many invasive genera have become entrenched, causing considerable economic damage.	Alismatales	Hydrocharis morsus-ranae
Juncaginaceae (arrowgrass family)	Juncago (an earlier synonym for the type genus, Triglochin) is from the Latin for "a rush-like plant".	3 genera, in northern temperate zones, South America, Oceania and parts of Africa	Herbaceous plants with grass-like leaves that grow in soil or water. Two species are edible.	Alismatales	Triglochin palustris
Maundiaceae (Maund's-arrowgrass family)	Maundia was named for John Maund (1823–1858), a physician and chemist.	1 genus, in eastern Australia	Aquatic perennials with leaves up to 80 cm (31 in) long. The family is likely to become endangered as water tables recede in eastern Australia.	Alismatales	Maundia triglochinoides
Posidoniaceae (tapeweed family)	Posidonia was named for Poseidon, a Greek god.	1 genus, in the Mediterranean and oceans south and west of Australia	Submerged plants with long linear leaves. Genetically identical beds of Posidonia oceanica in the Mediterranean can be kilometers wide and persist for many thousands of years.	Alismatales	Posidonia oceanica
Potamogetonaceae (pondweed family)	Potamogeton comes from Greek and Latin plant names.	5 genera, worldwide	Aquatic plants, usually perennials. The plants are an important food source for many birds and aquatic animals.	Alismatales	Potamogeton natans
Ruppiaceae (tasselweed family)	Ruppia was named for Heinrich Bernhard Ruppius (1688–1719).	1 genus, scattered worldwide, in ponds, marshes and shallow seas	Submerged herbaceous plants, usually annuals with stalkless leaves	Alismatales	Ruppia polycarpa
Scheuchzeriaceae (Rannoch-rush family)	Scheuchzeria was named for Johann Gaspar Scheuchzer (1684–1738) and his brother Johann Jacob.	1 genus, in arctic sphagnum bogs	Perennial aquatic plants. The linear leaves have parallel veins.	Alismatales	Scheuchzeria palustris
Tofieldiaceae (false-asphodel family)	Tofieldia was named for Thomas Tofield (1730–1779).	4 genera, mostly in northern boreal and montane zones, with some species in the US, China and Japan	Herbaceous rhizomatous perennials, usually with leaves attached at the plant's base	Alismatales	Tofieldia calyculata
Zosteraceae (eelgrass family)	Zostera is from the Greek for "belt".	2 genera, in temperate and subtropical sea beds	Perennials with simple leaves. The plants have been used as packing material. The dense growths support commercially important fish and shrimp.	Alismatales	Zostera marina

== See also ==
- List of plant family names with etymologies
