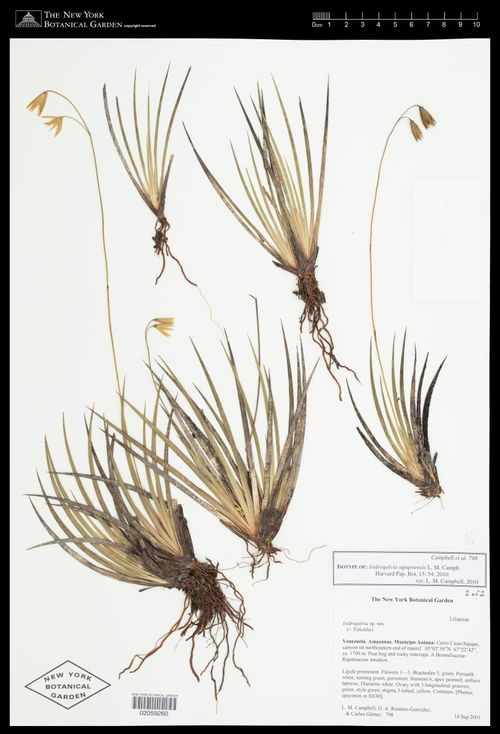

Scientific classification
- Kingdom: Plantae
- Clade: Embryophytes
- Clade: Tracheophytes
- Clade: Spermatophytes
- Clade: Angiosperms
- Clade: Monocots
- Order: Alismatales
- Family: Tofieldiaceae
- Genus: Harperocallis
- Species: H. sipapoensis

Binomial name
- Harperocallis sipapoensis (L.M.Campb.) L.M.Campb. & Dorr

Synonyms
- Isidrogalvia sipapoensis L.M.Campb.

= Harperocallis sipapoensis =

Species of flowering plant

Harperocallis sipapoensis is a species of flowering plant in the family Tofieldiaceae. It is native to, and named for, Cerro Sipapo, a mountain in Venezuela.

Harperocallis sipapoensis is a perennial or rhizomatous plant, with white tepals, and pendant (hanging) flowers. It was described in 2010, and moved to the genus Harperocallis in 2013.

== Taxonomy ==
Harperocallis sipapoensis was described in 2010, by Lisa Campbell, as Isidrogalvia sipapoensis. In 2013, Campbell and Laurence Joseph Dorr moved it to the genus Harperocallis, along with nine other species.

The type material was collected on Cuao Massif, at an elevation of around 1,700 metres (5,600 ft). The species' type locality is Cerro Sipapo, a mountain in Cuao Massif.

== Distribution ==
Harperocallis sipapoensis is native to the wet tropical biome of south-west Venezuela, and is found on Cerro Sipapo. The species is known only from Cerro Sipapo, though it is expected to occur on nearby Cerro Autana.

The species grows in wet meadows dominated by shrubs.

== Description ==
Harperocallis sipapoensis is a perennial or rhizomatous plant with underground storage organs. The plant is 23–50 centimetres (9.1–19.7 in) tall, and has abundant, coarse roots.

The leaves are 7.5–17.5 centimetres (3.0–6.9 in) long, 2–5 millimetres (0.079–0.197 in) wide, and occasionally sickle-shaped. They have sheathes covering around a third of their length. The leaves have reddish-brown margins.

The tepals are narrowly elliptic, white, and turn green as they age. The inflorescence has one to four flowers. The inflorescence stem is 22–30 centimetres (8.7–11.8 in) long.

The capsules have nine prominent ribs. The seeds are rod-shaped.

Harperocallis sipapoensis has pendant (hanging) flowers, which are unusual in the genus, though they are also present in Harperocallis penduliflora. H. sipapoensis has shorter, narrower, leaves, and fewer flowers on its inflorescences.

== Etymology ==
The specific epithet refers to Cerro Sipapo.
