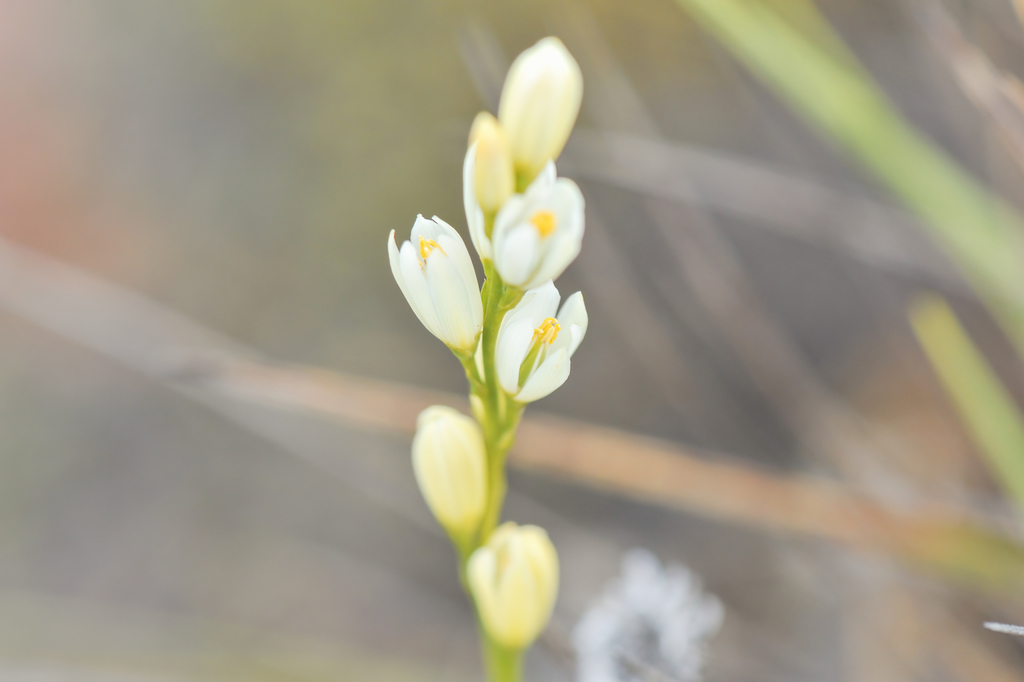

Scientific classification
- Kingdom: Plantae
- Clade: Embryophytes
- Clade: Tracheophytes
- Clade: Spermatophytes
- Clade: Angiosperms
- Clade: Monocots
- Order: Alismatales
- Family: Tofieldiaceae
- Genus: Harperocallis
- Species: H. schomburgkiana

Binomial name
- Harperocallis schomburgkiana (Oliv.) L.M.Campb. & Dorr

Synonyms
- Isidrogalvia schomburgkiana (Oliv.) Cruden; Tofieldia schomburgkiana Oliv.; Isidrogalvia guianensis Klotzsch; Tofieldia guianensis (Klotzsch) R.Schulze

= Harperocallis schomburgkiana =

Species of flowering plant

Harperocallis schomburgkiana is a species of flowering plant in the family Tofieldiaceae. It is a rhizomatous plant with white to cream tepals. The species is native to the tepuis of Brazil, Venezuela, and Guyana.

The species was first named in 1849, as Isidrogalvia guianensis. It was later transferred to the genus Tofieldia. In 2013, it was moved to the genus Harperocallis.

== Taxonomy ==
In 1849, Johann Friedrich Klotzsch published the name Isidrogalvia guianensis, a synonym of Harperocallis schomburgkiana. Isidrogalvia guianensis is considered a nomen nudum. In 1886, Daniel Oliver named Tofieldia schomburgkiana, another synonym of H. schomburgkiana. In 1991, Robert William Cruden moved the species, along with three others, from Tofieldia to the genus Isidrogalvia, and the species became Isidrogalvia schomburgkiana. In 2013, Isidrogalvia schomburgkiana was moved to the genus Harperocallis, along with nine other species.

== Distribution ==
Harperocallis schomburgkiana is native to northern Brazil, southern Venezuela, and western Guyana. It occurs primarily on sandstone tepuis, including Mount Roraima and Cerro de la Neblina. The species has been found at elevations of 1,700–2,800 metres (5,600–9,200 ft), Rarely, it also occurs in savannas, at elevations of 950–1,200 metres (3,120–3,940 ft).

Harperocallis schomburgkiana is found in rocky areas, dry slopes, forests (including forests dominated by Clusia and Podocarpus), and savannas. Its distribution overlaps with Harperocallis duidae.

== Description ==
Harperocallis schomburgkiana is a rhizomatous plant with underground storage organs. The outer leaves are 9–30 centimetres (3.5–11.8 in) long, and 3–6.5 millimetres (0.12–0.26 in) wide.

The plant has eight to twenty-three flowers. The tepals are white to cream in colour, and become yellow or green with age. The tepals are 8–12 millimetres (0.31–0.47 in) long, and 1.2–3.1 millimetres (0.047–0.122 in) wide.

The flowers and fruits have long, slender stems. The capsules have nine ribs. The seeds are 2.5–3 millimetres (0.098–0.118 in) long, and around 0.2 millimetres (0.0079 in) wide.
