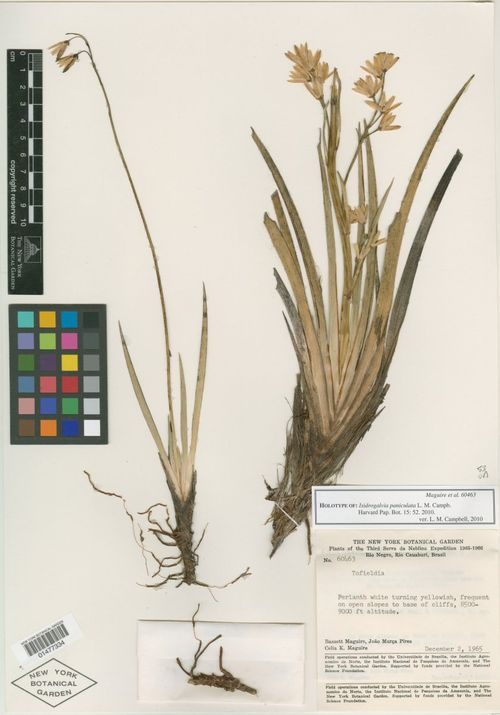
- Holotype

Scientific classification
- Kingdom: Plantae
- Clade: Embryophytes
- Clade: Tracheophytes
- Clade: Spermatophytes
- Clade: Angiosperms
- Clade: Monocots
- Order: Alismatales
- Family: Tofieldiaceae
- Genus: Harperocallis
- Species: H. paniculata

Binomial name
- Harperocallis paniculata (L.M.Campb.) L.M.Campb. & Dorr

Synonyms
- Isidrogalvia paniculata L.M.Campb.

= Harperocallis paniculata =

Species of flowering plant

Harperocallis paniculata is a species of flowering plant in the family Tofieldiaceae. It is known only from Serra da Neblina, Brazil.

H. paniculata is over 30 centimetres (12 in) tall, and has straight or sickle shaped leaves. The tepals are white to yellow. The species has a compound inflorescence which is unique within Tofieldiaceae.

The species was described in 2010, and received its current name in 2013. The specific epithet refers to its compound inflorescence.

== Taxonomy ==
In 2010, Lisa M. Campbell named Isidrogalvia paniculata, a synonym of Harperocallis paniculata. In 2013, Campbell and Laurence Joseph Dorr moved ten species from Isidrogalvia, Asagraea, and Tofieldia into Harperocallis. Isidrogalvia paniculata was thus renamed to Harperocallis paniculata.

The species is known only from the holotype.

== Distribution ==
The species is endemic to Serra da Neblina, a massif in northern Brazil. It may also occur on the Venezuelan part of Serra da Neblina.

It grows on slopes, and the bases of cliffs, and has been found at elevations of 2,600–2,700 metres (8,500–8,900 ft).

== Description ==
Harperocallis paniculata are over 30 centimetres (12 in) tall. The branches are 5–10 centimetres (2.0–3.9 in) long, grow horizontally, and turn up slightly at the ends. It is a perennial or rhizomatous species, with underground storage organs.

The leaves are sickle-shaped to straight, 16–23 millimetres (0.63–0.91 in) long, and 4.5–6 millimetres (0.18–0.24 in) long. The leaf margins are reddish-brown.

H. paniculata has an open perianth. The tepals are white to yellow, and narrowly elliptical. The species' compound inflorescences, which have more than fifteen flowers, are unique within the family Tofieldiaceae. The full size of the inflorescence is unknown, as a portion was missing from the holotype specimen. The branches have around six flowers, which are soiltary or paired.

== Etymology ==
The specific epithet of Harperocallis paniculata comes from the Latin panicula. The name refers to the species' compound inflorescence.
