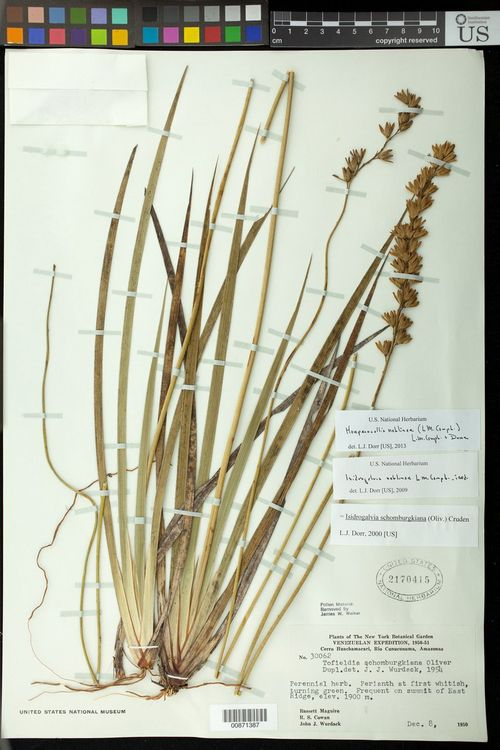

Scientific classification
- Kingdom: Plantae
- Clade: Embryophytes
- Clade: Tracheophytes
- Clade: Spermatophytes
- Clade: Angiosperms
- Clade: Monocots
- Order: Alismatales
- Family: Tofieldiaceae
- Genus: Harperocallis
- Species: H. neblinae

Binomial name
- Harperocallis neblinae (Steyerm. ex L.M.Campb.) L.M.Campb. & Dorr

Synonyms
- Isidrogalvia neblinae Steyerm. ex L.M.Campb.

= Harperocallis neblinae =

Species of flowering plant

Harperocallis neblinae is a species of flowering plant in the family Tofieldiaceae. It is endemic to, and named after, Cerro de la Neblina, Venezuela.

H. neblinae is 50–100 centimetres (1.6–3.3 ft) tall, and has white to greenish-yellow tepals. The species was described in 2010, and was moved to its current genus in 2013.

== Distribution ==
Harperocallis neblinae is native to the wet tropical biome of Venezuela, and is endemic to Cerro de la Neblina. The species is found at elevations of 1,700–2,100 metres (5,600–6,900 ft).

== Taxonomy ==
Lisa Campbell described Harperocallis neblinae in 2010, and placed it in the genus Isidrogalvia. In 2013, Campbell and Laurence Joseph Dorr moved the species to the genus Harperocallis, along with nine other species.

== Description ==
Harperocallis neblinae grows 50–100 centimetres (1.6–3.3 ft) tall. It is a perennial or rhizomatous plant, with underground storage organs. The roots are coarse.

The leaves are sickle-shaped, 18–39 millimetres (0.71–1.54 in) long, and 6–7 millimetres (0.24–0.28 in) wide.

The inflorescence has twenty-five to forty flowers. The perianth is open. The plant has narrow elliptic tepals, which are white, and partially green or yellow. The stem of the inflorescence is 2–3 millimetres (0.079–0.118 in) wide.

The fruits are capsules with nine ribs. The seeds are golden-brown, and around 3.75 millimetres (0.148 in) long.

Harperocallis neblinae is similar to H. penduliflora, though the former has longer leaves.

== Etymology ==
The species is named after Cerro de la Neblina, its type locality. The name is ultimately dervied from nebula, the Latin word for mist.
