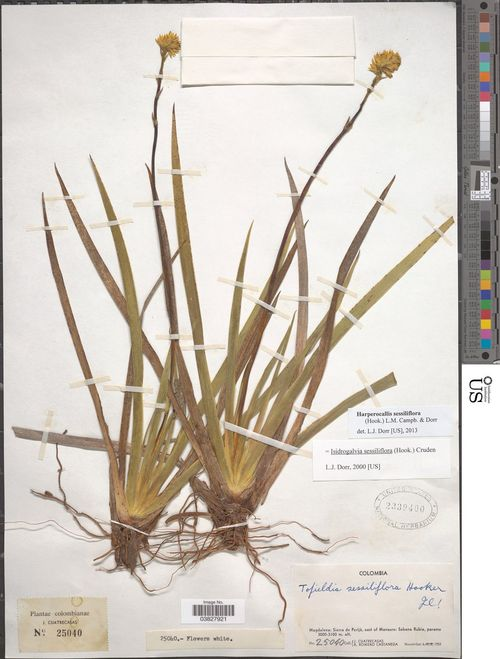

Scientific classification
- Kingdom: Plantae
- Clade: Embryophytes
- Clade: Tracheophytes
- Clade: Spermatophytes
- Clade: Angiosperms
- Clade: Monocots
- Order: Alismatales
- Family: Tofieldiaceae
- Genus: Harperocallis
- Species: H. sessiliflora

Binomial name
- Harperocallis sessiliflora (Hook.) L.M.Campb. & Dorr

Synonyms
- Asphodeliris sessiliflora (Hook.) Kuntze; Isidrogalvia sessiliflora (Hook.) Cruden; Tofieldia sessiliflora Hook.; Isidrogalvia moritziana Klotzsch ex Baker; Tofieldia moritziana (Klotzsch ex Baker) R.Schulze

= Harperocallis sessiliflora =

Species of flowering plant

Harperocallis sessiliflora is a species of flowering plant in the family Tofieldiaceae. It is a rhizomatous plant.

H. sessiliflora is native to the montane tropical biome of Colombia and Venezuela. It may also be present in Ecuador.

The species was described in 1844, and placed in the genus Tofieldia. In 2013, it was moved to the genus Harperocallis.

== Taxonomy ==
The first description of Harperocallis sessiliflora was published in 1844, in William Jackson Hooker's Icones Plantarum. It was described under the name Tofieldia sessiliflora. In 1991, Robert William Cruden moved Tofieldia sessiliflora, along with four others, to the genus Isidrogalvia. In 2013, Lisa Campbell and Laurence Joseph Dorr moved the species, along with nine others, into the genus Harperocallis.

== Distribution ==
Harperocallis sessiliflora is native to Colombia (Antioquia Department, Boyacá Department, Cesar Department, Cundinamarca Department, Huila Department, Magdalena Department, and Norte de Santander Department), and Venezuela (Mérida and Táchira). It may be present in Ecuador's Loja Province, though this record is dubious.

The species is found in the montane tropical biome of the Andes mountains and the Cordillera de Mérida, and grows in igneous and granitic soil. The species has been found at elevations of 2,500–3,200 metres (8,200–10,500 ft).

== Description ==
Harperocallis sessiliflora is a rhizomatous plant with underground storage organs. Its capsules have nine ribs.
