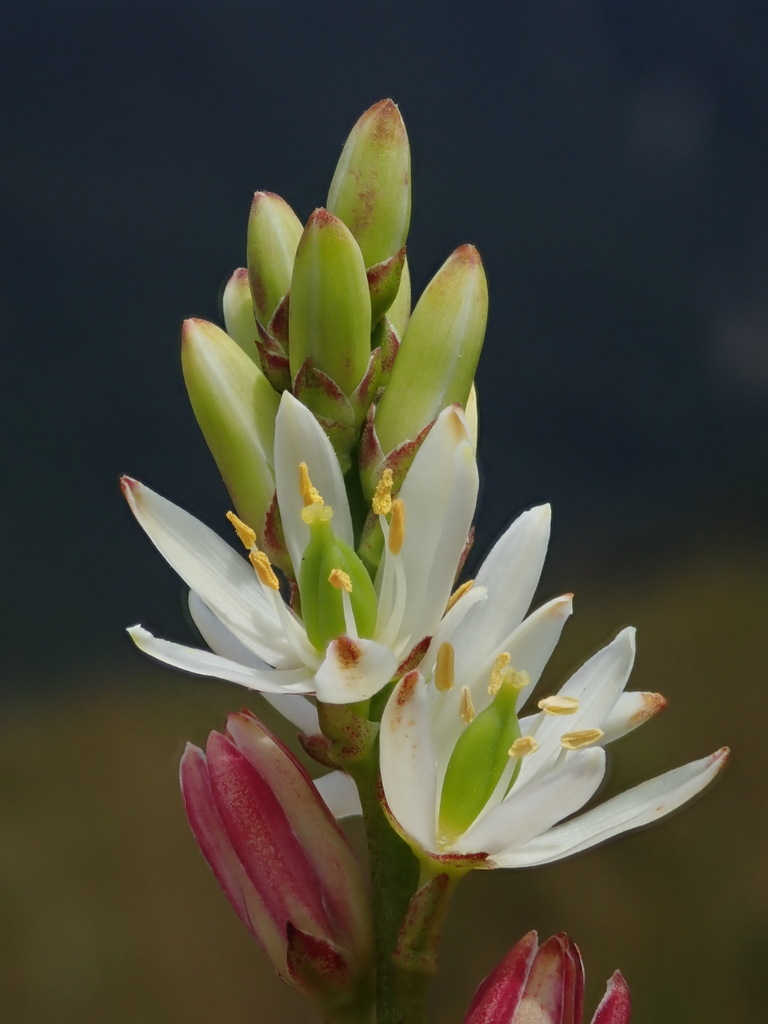

Scientific classification
- Kingdom: Plantae
- Clade: Embryophytes
- Clade: Tracheophytes
- Clade: Spermatophytes
- Clade: Angiosperms
- Clade: Monocots
- Order: Alismatales
- Family: Tofieldiaceae
- Genus: Harperocallis
- Species: H. falcata

Binomial name
- Harperocallis falcata (Ruiz & Pav.) L.M.Campb. & Dorr

Synonyms
- Asphodeliris falcata (Ruiz & Pav.) Kuntze; Isidrogalvia falcata Ruiz & Pav.; Narthecium falcatum (Ruiz & Pav.) Poir.; Tofieldia falcata (Ruiz & Pav.) Pers.; Tofieldia flexuosa Willd.; Tofieldia frigida Kunth

= Harperocallis falcata =

Species of flowering plant

Harperocallis falcata is a species of flowering plant in the family Tofieldiaceae. It is a rhizome native to Ecuador and Peru. The species was described in 1802, and moved to its current genus in 2013.

== Distribution ==
Harperocallis falcata is native to the montane tropical biomes of Ecuador and central Peru. It is present in the Andes mountains, at elevations of 2,300–3,860 metres (7,550–12,660 ft).

== Taxonomy ==
Hipólito Ruiz López & José Antonio Pavón Jiménez described Harperocallis falcata in 1802, as Isidrogalvia falcata. It was the first species in Isidrogalvia. The species has also been placed in the genus Tofieldia. In 2013, it was moved to the genus Harperocallis, along with nine other species.

== Description ==
Harperocallis falcata is a rhizome with underground storage organs.
