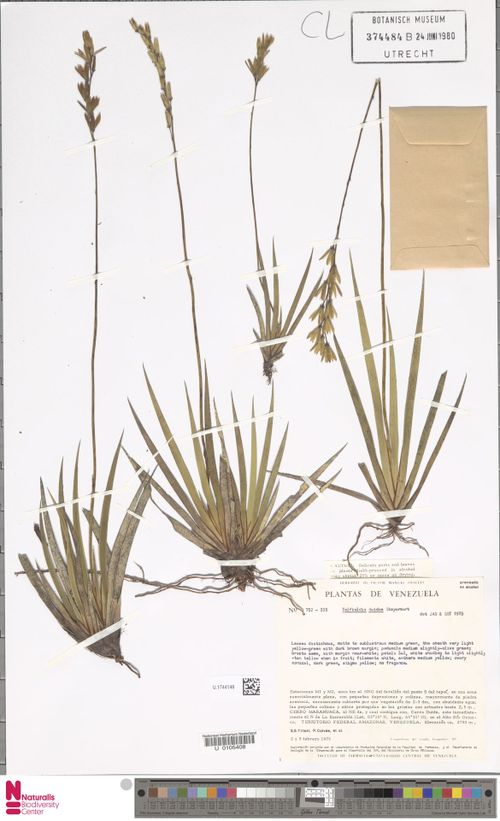

Scientific classification
- Kingdom: Plantae
- Clade: Embryophytes
- Clade: Tracheophytes
- Clade: Spermatophytes
- Clade: Angiosperms
- Clade: Monocots
- Order: Alismatales
- Family: Tofieldiaceae
- Genus: Harperocallis
- Species: H. duidae

Binomial name
- Harperocallis duidae (Steyerm.) L.M.Campb. & Dorr

Synonyms
- Isidrogalvia duidae (Steyerm.) Cruden; Tofieldia duidae Steyerm.

= Harperocallis duidae =

Species of flowering plant

Harperocallis duidae is a species of flowering plant in the family Tofieldiaceae. It is a perennial or rhizome.

The species is endemic to two tepuis in Venezuela. It was described in 1951, and received its current name in 2013.

== Taxonomy ==
In 1951, Julian Alfred Steyermark described Harperocallis duidae, and placed it in the genus Tofieldia. In 1991, the species was moved to the genus Isidrogalvia. In 2013, Lisa M. Campbell and Laurence Joseph Dorr moved the species to the genus Harperocallis.

The type specimen was collected in 1944, from the summit of Cerro Duida, in Venezuela.

== Distribution ==
Harperocallis duidae is native to the wet tropical biome of southern Venezuela.

It is endemic to Cerro Jaua and Cerro Duida, two tepuis in the Guayana Highlands, Venezuela. It is found at elevations of 1,000–2,100 metres (3,300–6,900 ft).

== Description ==
Harperocallis duidae is a perennial plant or rhizome, with underground storage organs.
