= Harperocallis longiflora =

Scientific classification
- Kingdom: Plantae
- Clade: Embryophytes
- Clade: Tracheophytes
- Clade: Spermatophytes
- Clade: Angiosperms
- Clade: Monocots
- Order: Alismatales
- Family: Tofieldiaceae
- Genus: Harperocallis
- Species: H. longiflora

Binomial name
- Harperocallis longiflora (Rusby) L.M.Campb. & Dorr

Synonyms
- Asagraea longiflora Rusby; Isidrogalvia longiflora (Rusby) Cruden & Dorr

Species of flowering plant

Harperocallis longiflora is a species of flowering plant in the family Tofieldiaceae. It is a rhizomatous plant native to Bolivia. The species was described in 1910, and moved to its current genus in 2013.

== Distribution ==
Harperocallis longiflora is native to the subtropical biome of western Bolivia. It is known only from its type locality, in La Paz, Bolivia. Specimens have been collected from elevations of 1,785–2,000 metres (5,856–6,562 ft).

== Taxonomy ==
Henry Hurd Rusby described the species in 1910, and placed it in the genus Asagrea. In 1996, Robert William Cruden and Laurence Joseph Dorr moved the species to the genus Isidrogalvia. In 2013, Dorr and Lisa M. Campbell moved the species to Harperocallis, along with nine other species.

== Description ==
Harperocallis longiflora is a rhizomatous plant with underground storage organs.
