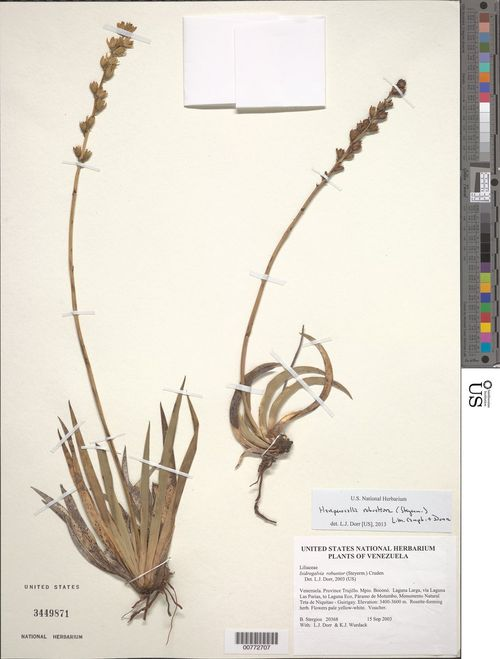

Scientific classification
- Kingdom: Plantae
- Clade: Embryophytes
- Clade: Tracheophytes
- Clade: Spermatophytes
- Clade: Angiosperms
- Clade: Monocots
- Order: Alismatales
- Family: Tofieldiaceae
- Genus: Harperocallis
- Species: H. robustior

Binomial name
- Harperocallis robustior (Steyerm.) L.M.Campb. & Dorr

Synonyms
- Isidrogalvia robustior (Steyerm.) Cruden; Tofieldia sessiliflora var. robustior Steyerm.

= Harperocallis robustior =

Species of flowering plant

Harperocallis robustior is a species of flowering plant in the family Tofieldiaceae. It is a rhizomatous plant native to Venezuela. The species was described in 1951, and was moved to its current genus in 2013.

== Taxonomy ==
In 1951, Julian Alfred Steyermark described Tofieldia sessiliflora var. robustior, a synonym of Harperocallis robustior. In 1991, Robert William Cruden described the taxon as a species, and placed it in the genus Isidrogalvia. The species was known as Isidrogalvia robustior until 2013, when it was moved to the genus Harperocallis.

== Distribution ==
Harperocallis robustior is native to the montane tropical biome of Venezuela. It is present in the states of Lara, Mérida, and Trujillo, at elevations of 2,200–3,700 metres (7,200–12,100 ft).

== Description ==
Harperocallis robustior is a rhizomatous plant with underground storage organs.
