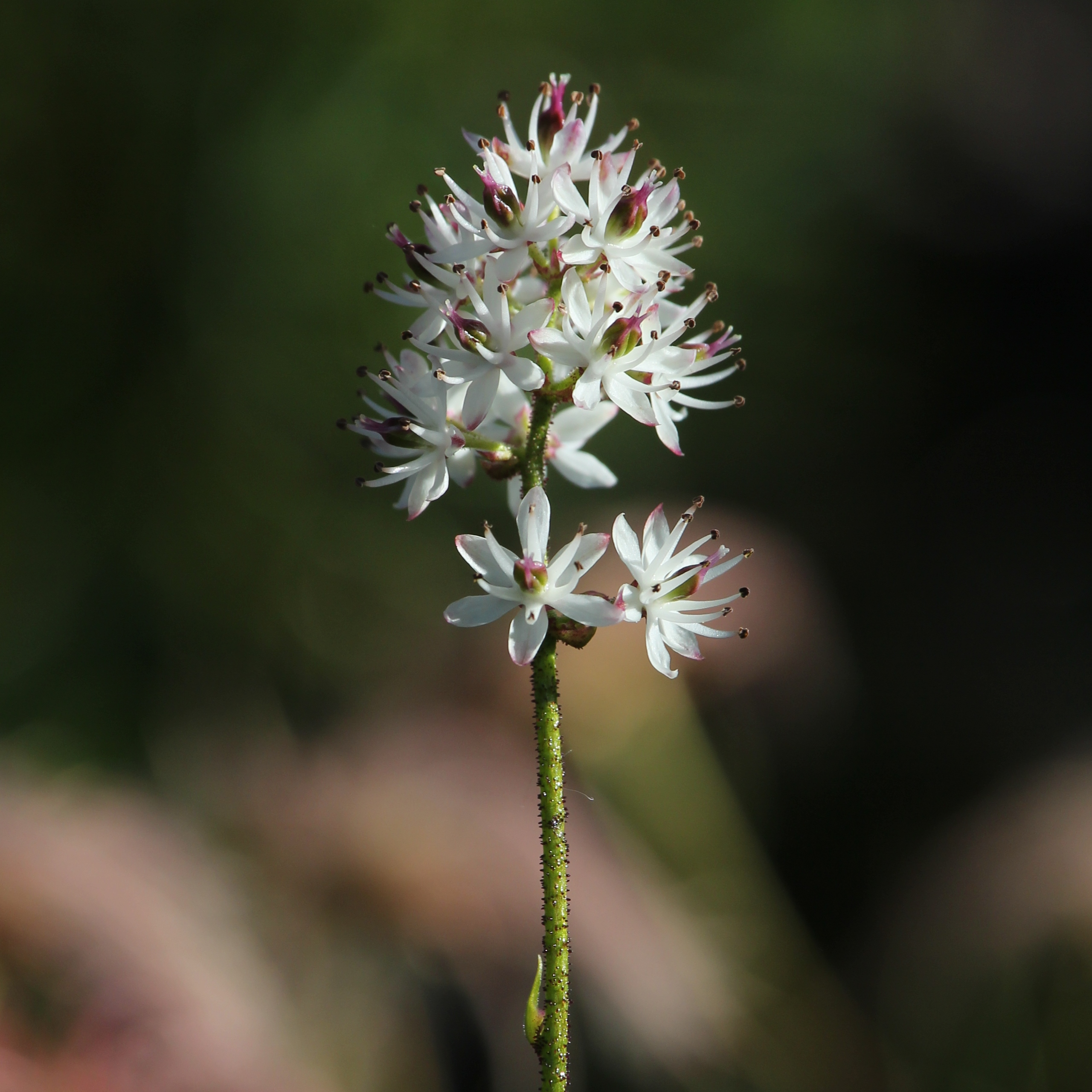

Scientific classification
- Kingdom: Plantae
- Clade: Tracheophytes
- Clade: Angiosperms
- Clade: Monocots
- Order: Alismatales
- Family: Tofieldiaceae
- Genus: Triantha
- Species: T. japonica

Binomial name
- Triantha japonica (Miq.) Baker

= Triantha japonica =

Species of plant

Triantha japonica is a species of flowering plant in the genus Triantha. It is native to Japan, and is the only Triantha species without a presence in North America. It was first described by John Gilbert Baker in 1879.
