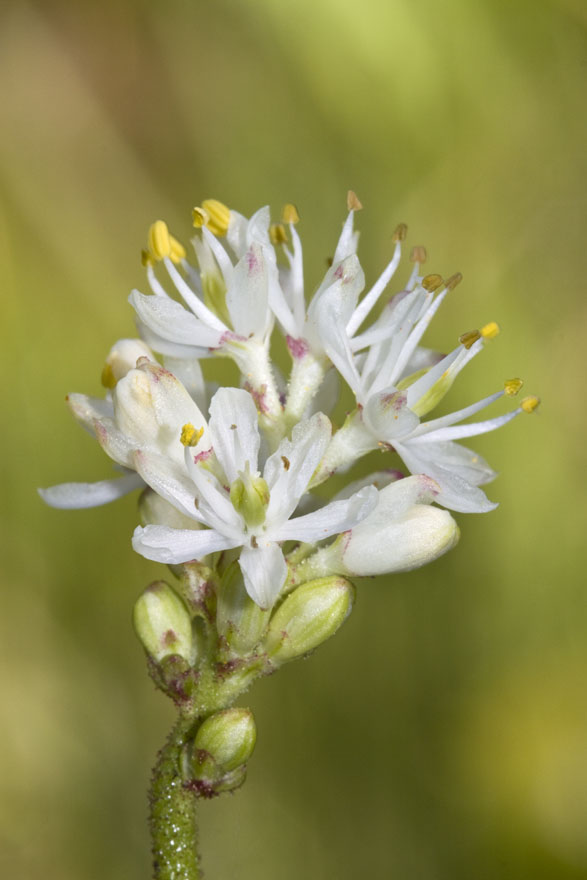

Scientific classification
- Kingdom: Plantae
- Clade: Embryophytes
- Clade: Tracheophytes
- Clade: Angiosperms
- Clade: Monocots
- Order: Alismatales
- Family: Tofieldiaceae
- Genus: Triantha
- Species: T. occidentalis

Binomial name
- Triantha occidentalis (S.Watson) R.R.Gates

Synonyms
- Asphodeliris occidentalis (S.Watson) Kuntze; Tofieldia glutinosa subsp. occidentalis (S.Watson) C.L.Hitchc.; Tofieldia glutinosa var. occidentalis (S.Watson) C.L.Hitchc.; Tofieldia occidentalis S.Watson

= Triantha occidentalis =

Species of flowering plant

Triantha occidentalis, the western false asphodel, is a species of carnivorous flowering plant in the genus Triantha from the family Tofieldiaceae within the order of the Alismatales. It is found in the Pacific Northwest. It was recognised as a carnivorous plant in 2021, a rare occurrence within the Monocot clade.

== Botanical history ==
Triantha occidentalis was described by Sereno Watson in 1879 as Tofieldia occidentalis, and reassigned to Triantha by R. R. Gates in 1918. The carnivorous behavior of the plant was discovered in 2021 by a group of scientists from the University of British Columbia and the University of Wisconsin–Madison.

== Range ==
The native range of Triantha occidentalis is from Southeast Alaska to Central California. The range includes the US states of Alaska, California, Idaho, Montana, Oregon, Washington, and Wyoming and the Canadian provinces of Alberta and British Columbia.

== Carnivory ==
Triantha occidentalis is a carnivorous plant; the flower stems are covered in a sticky substance, and have tiny hairs that produce a digestive enzyme, a phosphatase. The sticky substance is able to trap small insects, which are digested by the enzyme from the hairs, allowing the plant to absorb their nutrients. Other carnivorous plants have insect traps well away from flowers, in positions where pollinating insect such as bees and butterflies are not affected; T. occidentalis's sticky flower stems are only able to trap smaller insects such as fruit flies. It was not suspected that T. occidentalis, which grows near urban centers, was carnivorous until it was found to have a genetic deletion sometimes seen in carnivorous plants, prompting investigation. The plant is, as of 2021, the only one known to trap insects this unsuspected way, but it has been suggested that there may be more.

== Subspecies ==
The following subspecies are accepted:

- Triantha occidentalis subsp. brevistyla (C.L.Hitchc.) Packer
- Triantha occidentalis subsp. montana (C.L.Hitchc.) Packer
- Triantha occidentalis subsp. occidentalis
