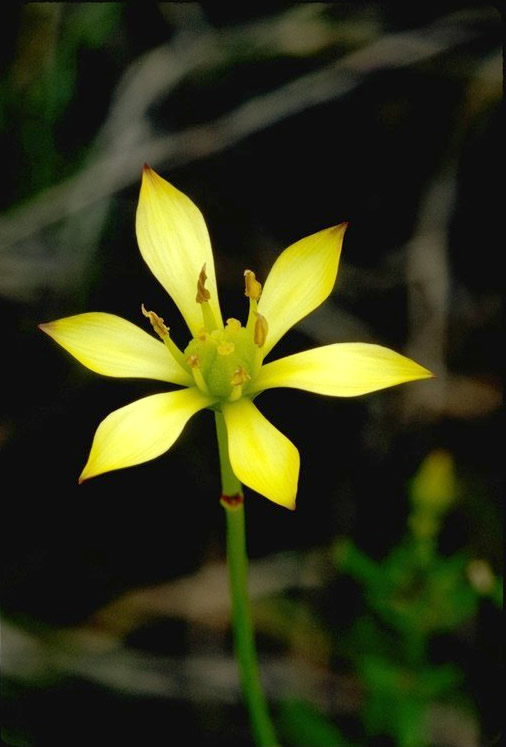

Conservation status
- Imperiled (NatureServe)

Scientific classification
- Kingdom: Plantae
- Clade: Embryophytes
- Clade: Tracheophytes
- Clade: Spermatophytes
- Clade: Angiosperms
- Clade: Monocots
- Order: Alismatales
- Family: Tofieldiaceae
- Genus: Harperocallis
- Species: H. flava

Binomial name
- Harperocallis flava McDaniel

= Harperocallis flava =

Species of flowering plant

Harperocallis flava, known by the common name Harper's beauty, is a species endemic to parts of Florida in the United States, where it is known mainly from the Apalachicola National Forest in the Panhandle. It is seriously endangered and has been on the United States' endangered species list since 1979.

The wildflower was first described in 1968 and by 1979 there were only three known populations totaling fewer than 100 individuals. Two of these populations were actually close enough together to be considered one population. These were all located in the Apalachicola National Forest and the United States Forest Service managed the area specifically for the conservation of this rare plant. More occurrences have been discovered since this time. The plant, previously known from Franklin and Liberty Counties, was found in Bay County in 2003. The population of seventy plants there is located on private property and it is not protected. The original Franklin County occurrence contains about 31 plants. In Liberty County there are about 16 occurrences with an uncertain estimate of over 8,000 plants in total.

This is a rhizomatous perennial herb with tufts of stiff, grasslike leaves up to 21 centimeters long. The inflorescence is a single flower on a long, erect stalk, blooming in April and May. It has yellow tepals up to 1.5 centimeters long which turn green as the plant produces fruit. While the plant can fertilize itself, it may also be pollinated by insects, particularly halictid bees.

This plant's natural habitat is a bog or wet prairie with seeps. The soil is acidic, sandy, and rich in peat. The dominant tree in the area is generally the long-leaf pine (Pinus palustris), and Harperocallis is considered a member of the long-leaf pine ecosystem. At one time there were more buckwheat tree (Cliftonia monophylla) and pond pine (Pinus serotina). The habitat is maintained by wildfire which prevents ecological succession and clears brush, old trees, and tall vegetation to provide the flower and other smaller plants with full sunlight. The fire or other forms of disturbance also prevent mats of grass from becoming too dense, allowing the flower to take hold.

Fire suppression is practiced today, altering the habitat from its natural state of disturbance. This is the main cause of the plant's increasing rarity. Today the plant does best in areas that are kept open by human-caused disturbance, such as roadsides and land that is mowed, but only to a point; severe disturbance from cars and machinery can destroy populations. Other threats include loss of plants to collectors and admirers of wildflowers who pick the blooms, and vandalism. H. flava is listed as an imperiled species and faces threats such as damage to its habitat and industrial forestry, that changes the conditions to water and soil in the plant's habitat. Insect predation serves as another threat. Genetic analysis of plants from different populations has been performed and it reveals that the species has a very low genetic diversity; this is a threat to the species' survival.
