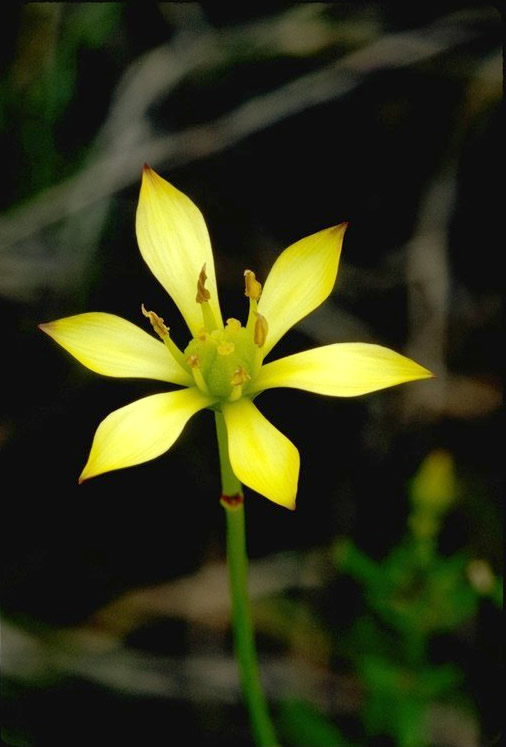
- Flower of Harperocallis flava

Scientific classification
- Kingdom: Plantae
- Clade: Embryophytes
- Clade: Tracheophytes
- Clade: Spermatophytes
- Clade: Angiosperms
- Clade: Monocots
- Order: Alismatales
- Family: Tofieldiaceae
- Genus: Harperocallis; McDaniel

Synonyms
- Isidrogalvia Ruiz & Pav.

= Harperocallis =

Genus of flowering plants

Harperocallis is a genus of flowering plants in the family Tofieldiaceae, native to Florida and northwestern South America. It was originally described as a monotypic genus, based on the Floridian H. flava, in 1968, but was expanded in 2013 to include ten South American species formerly placed in Isidrogalvia.

== Taxonomy ==
The genus was originally described in 1968, incorporating only the newly described type species, Harperocallis flava, an endemic of the Florida panhandle. On the basis of molecular and morphological evidence, H. flava was shown to be derived from or sister to Isidrogalvia, then treated as a genus of ten species native to the Guianas and the northern Andes, and was transferred into that genus in 2011. However, the original description of Isidrogalvia proved to include a European species previously used (under a different name) to typify Tofieldia, thus inadvertently rendering Isidrogalvia a later synonym of Tofieldia. After the rejection of a proposal to conserve the eleven species of Isidrogalvia with a new type, Harperocallis was instead revived with a broader circumscription to include the eleven New World species previously treated as Isidrogalvia.

Species

1. H. duidae (Steyerm.) L.M.Campb. & Dorr - S Venezuela
2. H. falcata (Ruiz & Pav.) L.M.Campb. & Dorr - Ecuador, Peru
3. H. flava McDaniel - Florida Panhandle
4. H. longiflora (Rusby) L.M.Campb. & Dorr - Bolivia
5. H. neblinae (Steyerm. ex L.M.Campb.) L.M.Campb. & Dorr - S Venezuela
6. H. paniculata (L.M.Campb.) L.M.Campb. & Dorr - N Brazil
7. H. penduliflora (L.M.Campb.) L.M.Campb. & Dorr - S Venezuela
8. H. robustior (Steyerm.) L.M.Campb. & Dorr - N Venezuela
9. H. schomburgkiana (Oliv.) L.M.Campb. & Dorr - S Venezuela, N Brazil, Guyana
10. H. sessiliflora (Hook.) L.M.Campb. & Dorr - N Venezuela, Colombia, Ecuador
11. H. sipapoensis (L.M.Campb.) L.M.Campb. & Dorr - S Venezuela
