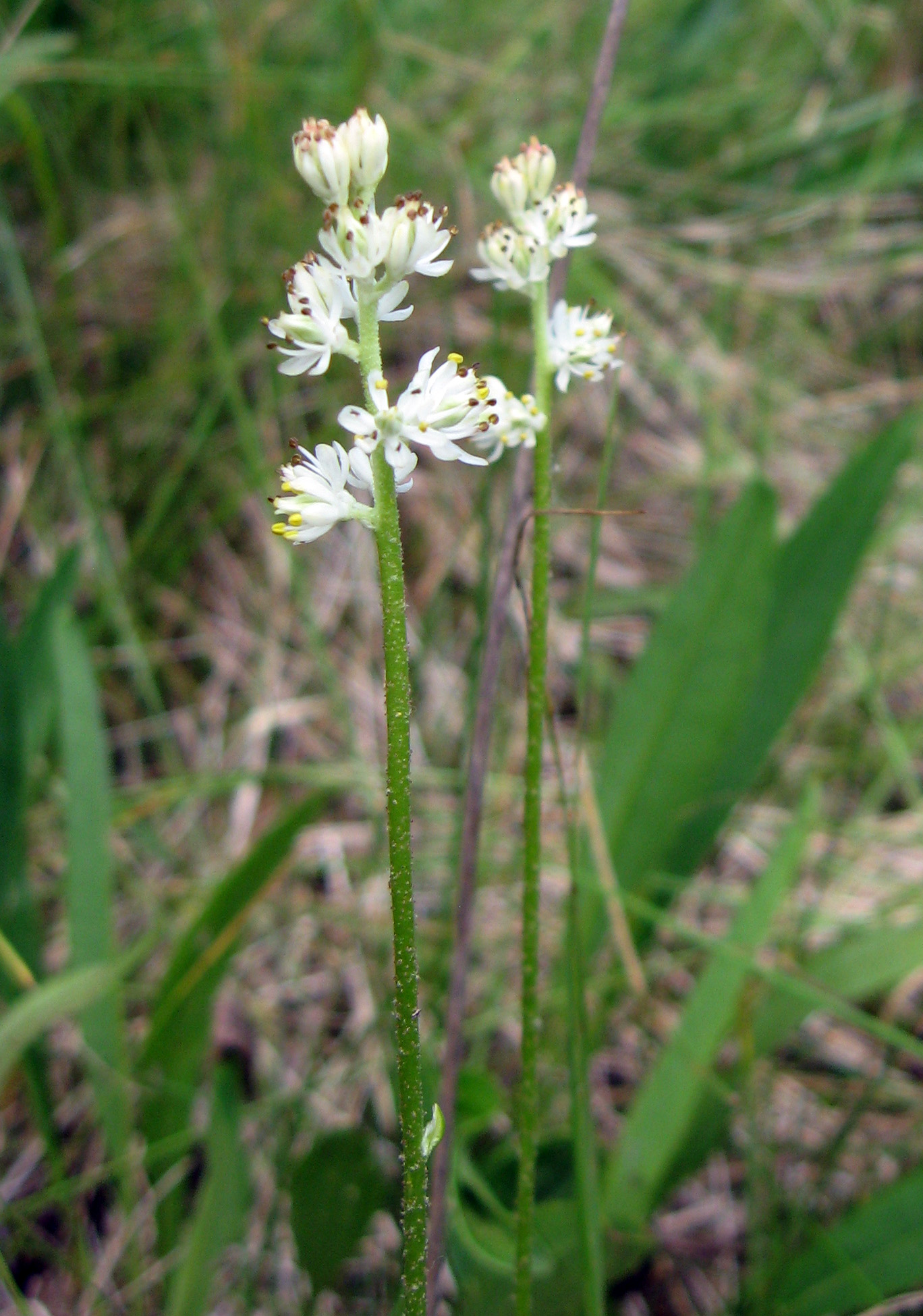

Scientific classification
- Kingdom: Plantae
- Clade: Embryophytes
- Clade: Tracheophytes
- Clade: Angiosperms
- Clade: Monocots
- Order: Alismatales
- Family: Tofieldiaceae
- Genus: Triantha
- Species: T. glutinosa

Binomial name
- Triantha glutinosa (Michx.) Baker

Synonyms
- Amianthium aspericaule (Poir.) A.Gray; Melanthium aspericaule Poir. Abama glutinosa (Michx.) Raf. Narthecium scabrum Raf. Asphodeliris glutinosa (Michx.) Kuntze; Narthecium falcatum Wahlenb. Narthecium glutinosum Michx. Tofieldia glutinosa (Michx.) Pers. Tofieldia glutinosa var. longifolia N.Coleman; Tofieldia glutinosa subsp. typica C.L.Hitchc. Tofieldia racemosa var. glutinosa (Michx.) H.E.Ahles; Trianthella glutinosa (Michx.) House

= Triantha glutinosa =

Species of plant

Triantha glutinosa is a species of flowering plant in the Tofieldiaceae family. It is commonly known as the sticky false asphodel, sticky tofieldia or northern bog asphodel, is a species of flowering plant in the tofieldia family.

It is native primarily to northern North America, where it is found in Canada and the United States. There are also disjunct populations south in the Appalachian Mountains. Its preferred habitat is wet areas such as marshes and seeps, particularly in calcareous soils.

It produces white-yellow flowers in the summer. An intermediate population that suggests a transition to the more southern Triantha racemosa is found in the New Jersey Pine Barrens.
