= Merumea =

Scientific classification
- Kingdom: Plantae
- Clade: Tracheophytes
- Clade: Angiosperms
- Clade: Eudicots
- Clade: Asterids
- Order: Gentianales
- Family: Rubiaceae
- Genus: Merumea; Steyerm.

Type species
- Merumea coccocypseloides Steyerm.

Genus of plants

Merumea is a genus of flowering plants in the family Rubiaceae. It is native to the Guiana Shield.

== Species ==
- Merumea coccocypseloides Steyerm. – southern Venezuela (Cerro Sipapo)
- Merumea plicata Steyerm. – Guyana
