= Fillstabäcken Nature Reserve =

Nature reserve in Sweden

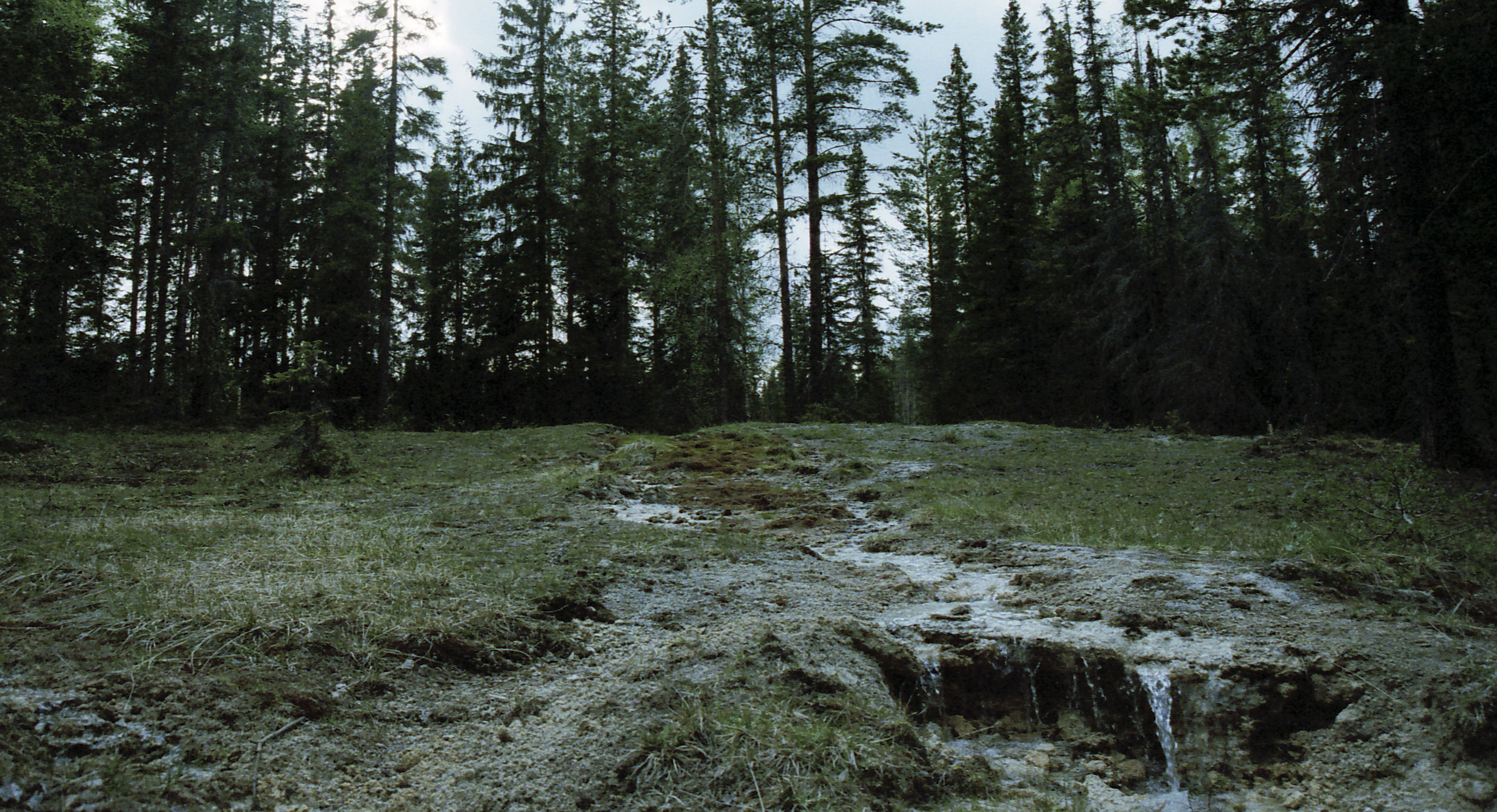

- Location within Jämtland Location within Sweden
- Location: Sweden
- Nearest city: Östersund
- Coordinates: 63°08′N 14°32′E
- Area: 15 ha (37 acres)
- Established: 1982

Fillstabäcken Nature Reserve (Swedish: Fillstabäckens naturreservat) is a nature reserve in Jämtland County in Sweden. It is part of the EU-wide Natura 2000-network.

The nature reserve contains Sweden's most extensive area of tufa, formed by a spring that has deposited calcium carbonate here for around 5,000 years. The spring and tufa is surrounded by an area of forest, and contains several unusual plant species such as fly orchid, birds-eye primrose, Scottish asphodel, fragrant orchid, Pedicularis sceptrum-carolinum and Carex flava and its subspecies jemtlandica.
