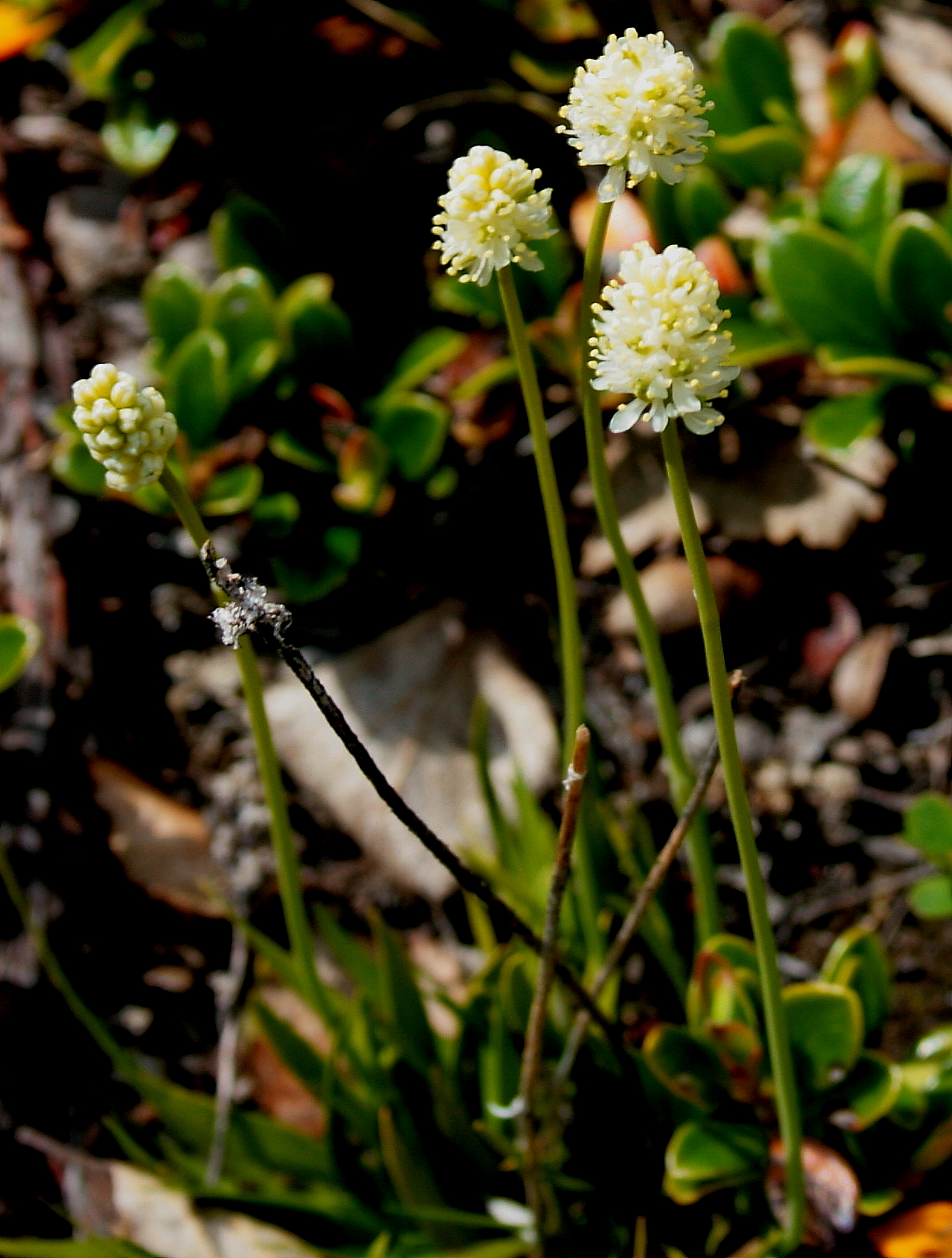

Scientific classification
- Kingdom: Plantae
- Clade: Tracheophytes
- Clade: Angiosperms
- Clade: Monocots
- Order: Alismatales
- Family: Tofieldiaceae
- Genus: Tofieldia
- Species: T. pusilla

Binomial name
- Tofieldia pusilla (Michx.) Pers.

Synonyms
- Narthecium pusillum Michx.

= Tofieldia pusilla =

Species of flowering plant in the family Tofieldiaceae

Tofieldia pusilla is a species of flowering plant in the family Tofieldiaceae. It is also sometimes placed in the lily family, Liliaceae. Its common name is Scottish asphodel in Europe, and Scotch false asphodel in North America. The plant is native to northern North America and parts of Eurasia, its circumpolar distribution extending across Canada and the northern United States to Greenland, Iceland and northern Europe.

== Irritant rejected by grazing stock ==
The plant, when raw, has a very bitter taste, causing numbness, burning and irritation of the mucous membranes of the lips and mouth. Sheep in the pastureland of Iceland which graze inadvertently upon it will spit it out, as evidenced by the fact that broken plants are often to be found discarded in pastures where sheep have been grazing.
This acridity and potential toxicity may be accounted for by the fact that Tofieldia, like other basal monocots (including, most notably, the related plant family Araceae) contains druses of calcium oxalate crystals, noted for just such irritating effects, should raw plant material be consumed.

== In Scottish folk medicine ==
T. pusilla has been used in the traditional medicine of Scotland to treat a variety of ailments, including skin conditions, respiratory problems, and digestive issues. In regard to the third use listed: the roots of the plant have been used to make a tea that is believed to have a soothing effect on the stomach and intestines. Such an apparently anti-inflammatory effect of a Tofieldia tisane is not incompatible with the irritant effect of fresh plant material, given that both heating and steeping can eliminate crystals of calcium oxalate, as demonstrated in the traditional preparation of Araceous vegetables such as taro, which - like Tofieldia - are poisonous when raw. Elimination of calcium oxalate druses would then allow the therapeutic effects of other compounds present in T. pusilla to manifest, unimpaired by the irritant effect of the toxic crystals.

== In Scottish folklore ==
In Scotland, the plant had the alternative common name "King's Knot" and was believed in folk tradition to have apotropaic powers. For this reason, it was often deliberately planted near homes and farms to ward off evil spirits and bring good luck.

== Chemistry ==
Zomlefer, in her 1997 paper on the Tofieldiaceae, lists the following compounds as being present in plants belonging to the family: calcium oxalate (in the form of druses and cuboidal (prismatic) crystals), chelidonic acid, tannins, saponins, and the flavonoids kaempferol and quercetin.
