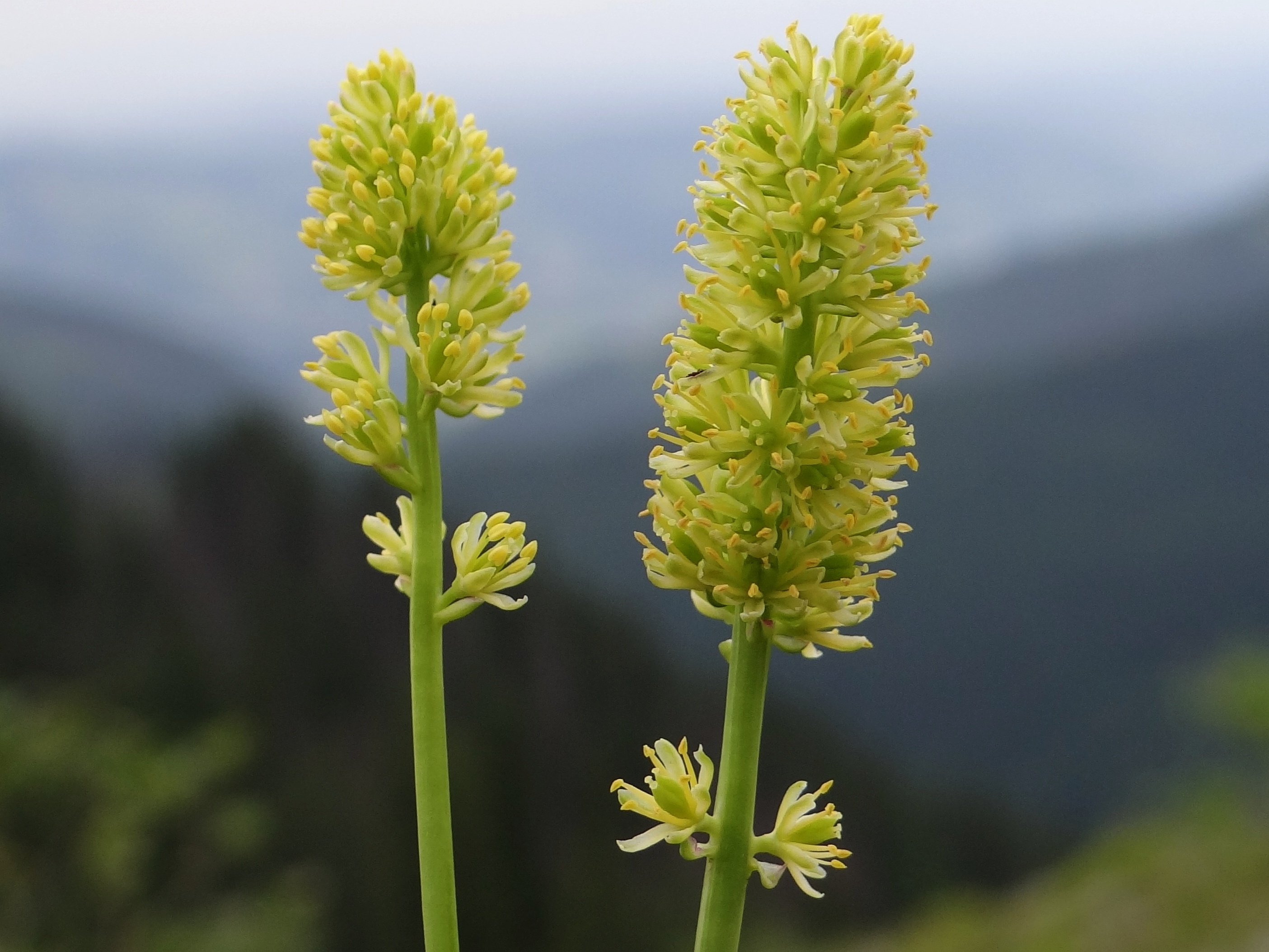

Scientific classification
- Kingdom: Plantae
- Clade: Tracheophytes
- Clade: Angiosperms
- Clade: Monocots
- Order: Alismatales
- Family: Tofieldiaceae
- Genus: Tofieldia
- Species: T. calyculata

Binomial name
- Tofieldia calyculata (L.) Wahlenb.

= Tofieldia calyculata =

Species of flowering plant

Tofieldia calyculata is a species of flowering plant belonging to the family Tofieldiaceae.

Its native range is Gotland to Pyrenees and Ukraine.
