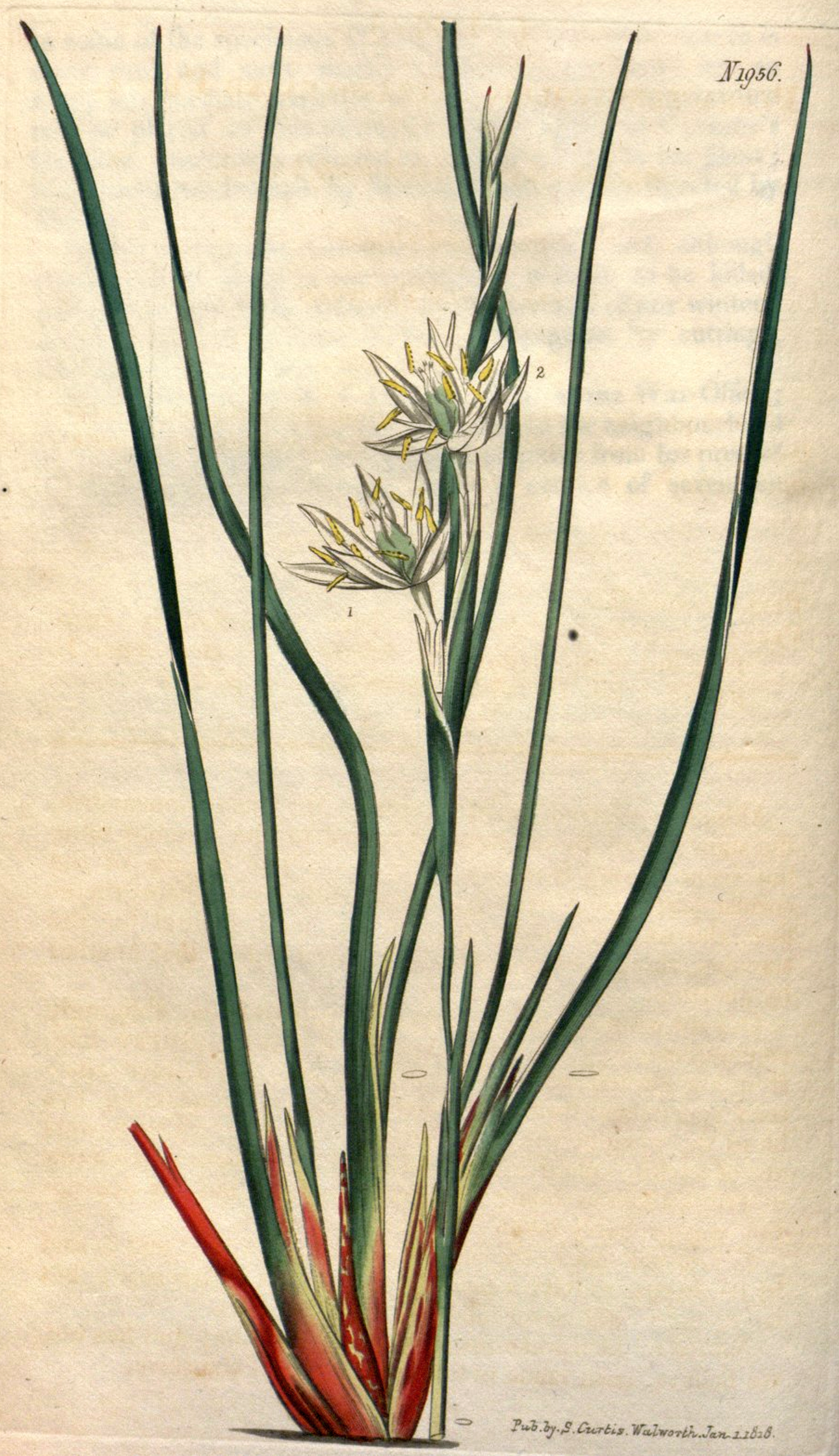
- 1818 illustration

Scientific classification
- Kingdom: Plantae
- Clade: Tracheophytes
- Clade: Angiosperms
- Clade: Monocots
- Order: Alismatales
- Family: Tofieldiaceae
- Genus: Pleea; Michx.
- Species: P. tenuifolia

Binomial name
- Pleea tenuifolia Michx.

Synonyms
- Ennearina Raf.; Tofieldia tenuifolia (Michx.) Utech; Ennearina pleiana Raf.

= Pleea =

Genus of flowering plants

Pleea is a small genus of flowering plants described as a genus in 1803. There is only one known species, Pleea tenuifolia, the rush featherling, native to the southeastern United States (Florida, Alabama, North Carolina, and South Carolina).
