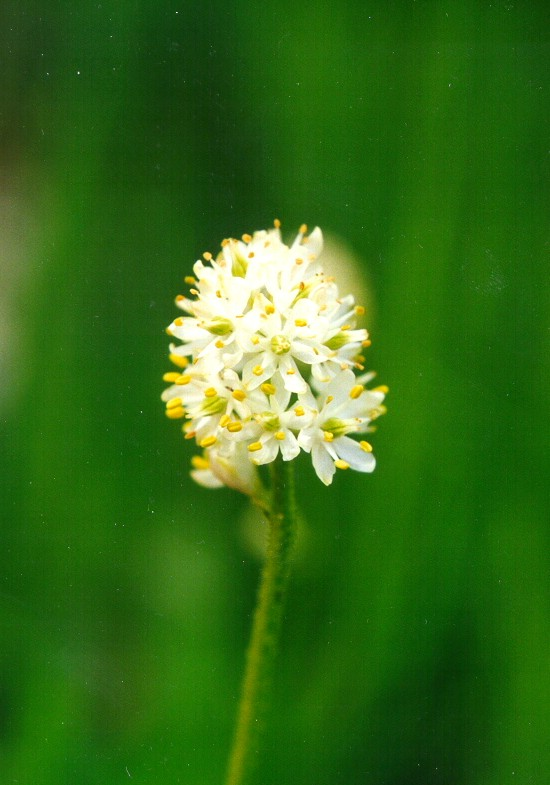
- Triantha occidentalis

Scientific classification
- Kingdom: Plantae
- Clade: Tracheophytes
- Clade: Angiosperms
- Clade: Monocots
- Order: Alismatales
- Family: Tofieldiaceae
- Genus: Triantha (Nutt.) Baker

Synonyms
- Tofieldia section Triantha Nutt.; Trianthella House 1921 not Hook.f. 1846

= Triantha =

Genus of flowering plants

Triantha is a small genus of flowering plants in the family Tofieldiaceae, first described as a genus in 1879. False asphodel is a common name for plants in this genus.

Triantha has four known species. One of these is endemic to Japan. The other three are native to North America.

A comparison of DNA sequences has indicated that Triantha glutinosa might be two species.

Before the family Tofieldiaceae was established in 1995, Triantha and related genera were usually placed in Nartheciaceae, Liliaceae, or Melanthiaceae, but molecular phylogenetic studies of monocots and Alismatales have shown that inclusion of Triantha etc. in these families makes them polyphyletic.

Some authors have included Triantha within the genus Tofieldia. Triantha is distinguished from Tofieldia by its glandular-pubescent stems and by the presence of seed appendages. In 2011, a study of two nuclear genes and ten chloroplast genes showed that Triantha and Tofieldia are monophyletic and closely related sister clades. The species of Triantha are so closely related that the authors could not resolve any relationships among them.

== Carnivory ==
Triantha occidentalis is a carnivorous plant; the flower stems are covered in a sticky substance, and have tiny hairs that produce a digestive enzyme, a phosphatase. The sticky substance is able to trap small insects, which are digested by the enzyme from the hairs, allowing the plant to absorb their nutrients. Other carnivorous plants have insect traps well away from flowers, in positions where pollinating insect such as bees and butterflies are not affected; T. occidentalis's sticky flower stems are only able to trap smaller insects such as fruit flies. It was not suspected that T. occidentalis, which grows near urban centers, was carnivorous until it was found to have a genetic deletion sometimes seen in carnivorous plants, prompting investigation. The plant is, as of 2021, the only one known to trap insects this unsuspected way, but it has been suggested that there may be more.

== Species ==
1. Triantha glutinosa (Michx.) Baker - sticky asphodel - Canada, Alaska, Great Lakes region, Maine, scattered other spots in USA
2. Triantha japonica (Miq.) Baker - Honshu
3. Triantha occidentalis (S.Wats.) R.R.Gates-western false asphodel - Western Canada (Alb, BC), western United States (AK WA OR CA ID MT WY)
4. Triantha racemosa (Walter) Small-coastal false asphodel - Coastal Plain of United States from TX to NJ
