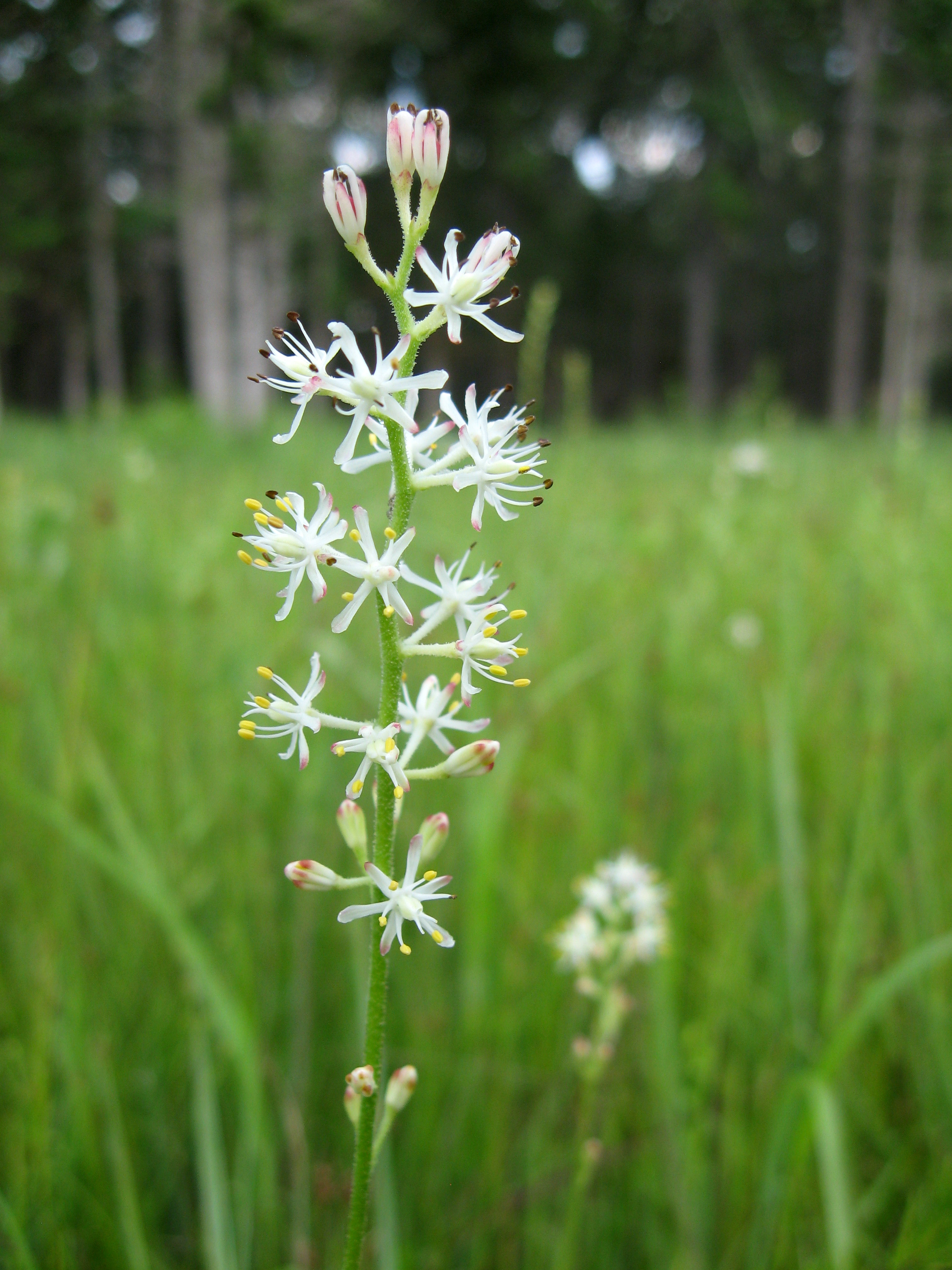

Scientific classification
- Kingdom: Plantae
- Clade: Tracheophytes
- Clade: Angiosperms
- Clade: Monocots
- Order: Alismatales
- Family: Tofieldiaceae
- Genus: Triantha
- Species: T. racemosa

Binomial name
- Triantha racemosa (Walter) Small

= Triantha racemosa =

Species of flowering plant

Triantha racemosa, commonly called the coastal false asphodel or southern bog asphodel, is a species of flowering plant in the Tofieldia family. It is native to the Coastal Plain of the Southeastern United States, although there are a few disjunct populations inland. It is found in acidic wetlands, including wet barrens and savannas.

Triantha racemosa produces a raceme of white flowers in mid-summer. An intermediate population that suggests a transition to the more northern Triantha glutinosa is found in the New Jersey Pine Barrens.
