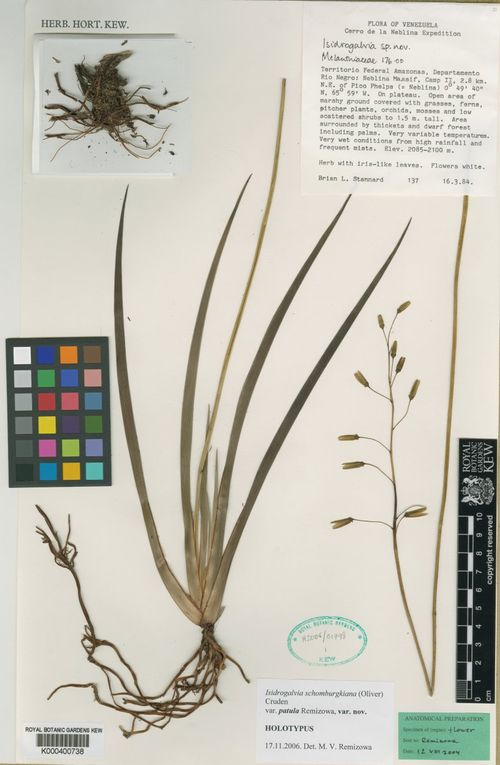

Scientific classification
- Kingdom: Plantae
- Clade: Embryophytes
- Clade: Tracheophytes
- Clade: Spermatophytes
- Clade: Angiosperms
- Clade: Monocots
- Order: Alismatales
- Family: Tofieldiaceae
- Genus: Harperocallis
- Species: H. penduliflora

Binomial name
- Harperocallis penduliflora (L.M.Campb.) L.M.Campb. & Dorr

Synonyms
- Isidrogalvia penduliflora L.M.Campb.; Isidrogalvia schomburgkiana var. patula Remizowa

= Harperocallis penduliflora =

Species of flowering plant

Harperocallis penduliflora is a species of flowering plant in the family Tofieldiaceae. The species is native to the Venezuelan portion of Cerro de la Neblina.

H. penduliflora is 55–100 centimetres (1.80–3.28 ft) tall. It has white tepals, and pendent (hanging) flowers. The species is named after its hanging flowers.

The species was described in 2010, and moved to its current genus in 2013.

== Taxonomy ==
Harperocallis penduliflora was described in 2010, as Isidrogalvia penduliflora, by Lisa Campbell. In 2013, Campbell and Laurence Joseph Dorr moved the species, along with nine others, to the genus Harperocallis.

The species is known only from its type locality.

== Distribution ==
The species is native to the wet tropical biome of Venezuela, and grows in woody shrublands. It is endemic to Cerro de la Neblina, and has been collected at elevations of 1,800–2,100 metres (5,900–6,900 ft).

The species may occur on the Brazilian portion of Cerro de la Neblina.

== Description ==
Harperocallis penduliflora is 55–100 centimetres (1.80–3.28 ft) tall. It is a perennial or rhizomatous plant with underground storage organs and coarse roots.

The leaves are 15.5–26 centimetres (6.1–10.2 in) long, and 5–9 millimetres (0.20–0.35 in) wide. They may be sickle-shaped.

H. penduliflora has pendent (hanging) flowers. The inflorescences have eleven to eighteen flowers. The tepals are elliptical and white, and the outer whorl has a green to yellow-midrib.

The fruits are capsules, which have nine prominent ribs.

== Etymology ==
The specific epithet of Harperocallis penduliflora refers to its pendulous flowers.
