= Cuao Massif =

- Cuao-Sipapo Massif, Macizo del Cuao
- Location within Venezuela

Highest point
- Elevation: 1,773 m (5,817 ft)
- Coordinates: 5°4′30″N 67°25′5″W

Geography
- Country: Venezuela
- State: Amazonas

The Cuao Massif or Cuao-Sipapo Massif is a complex of tepuis (table-top mountain) in southern Amazonas state of Venezuela. It includes several small sandstone tepuis and granitic mountaintops, including Cerro Cuao and Cerro Sipapo, which reach elevations between 1,400 and 2,000 meters. The massif is westernmost of the Western Pantepui District, which lies east of the Orinoco River, southwest of the Caura River, and north of the Ventuari River.

Tepuis are isolated flat-topped sandstone mountains with a montane flora and fauna distinct from the surrounding lowlands. Habitats in the massif include wet meadows, high-tepui shrub, and open rock habitats. Cuao Massif is home to many tepui-endemic species animals and plants.

The massif is within Macizo Cuao-Sipapo y Cerro Moriche Natural Monument, which was established in 1990 and covers an area of 3150.55 km^{2}. It is also within the Sipapo Reserve Forest, which covers an area of 12155.0 km^{2} and includes both highlands and lowlands extending west to the Orinoco.
