= Alismatid monocots =

Grade of flowering plant orders within Lilianae

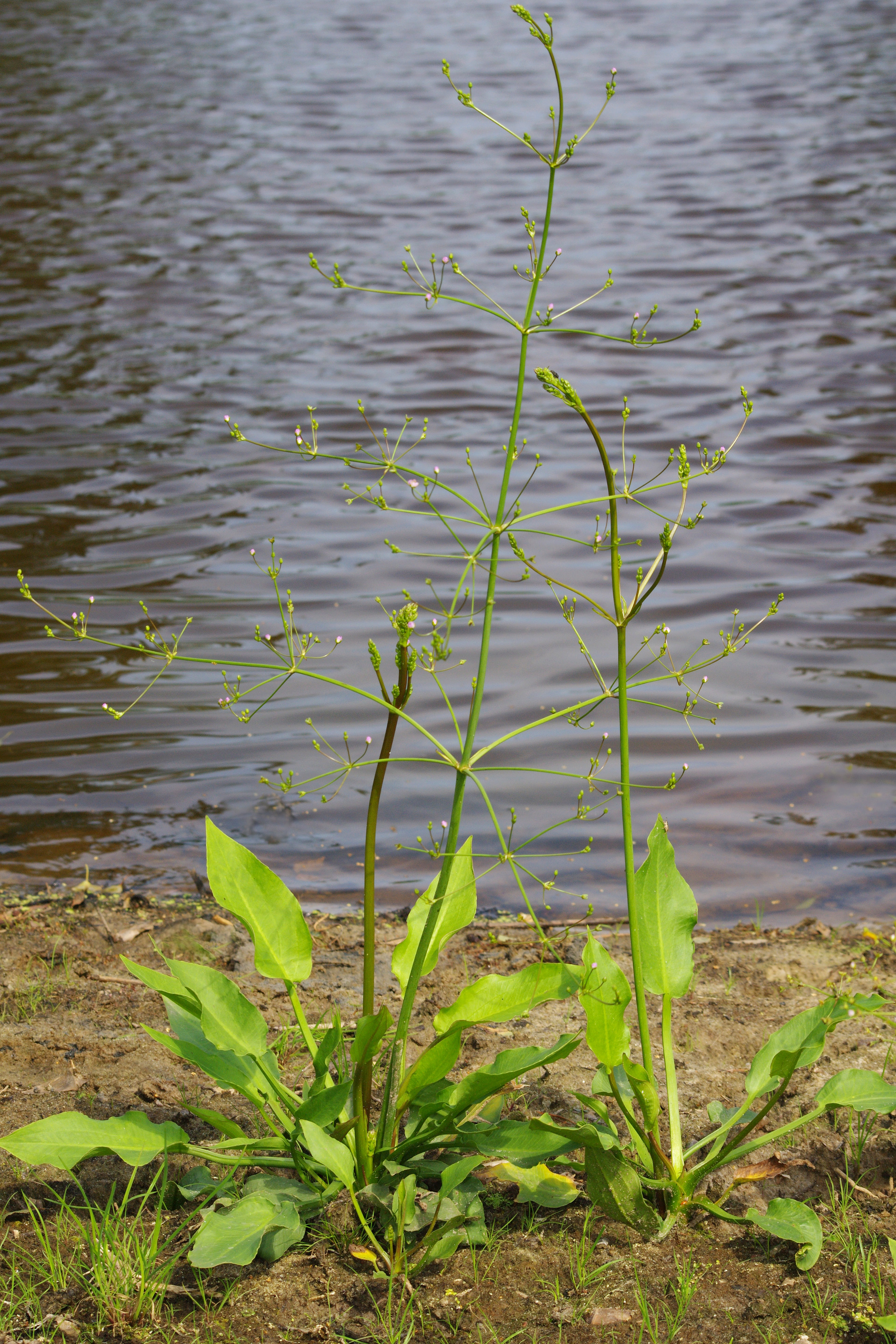
Alisma plantago-aquatica

Alismatid monocots (alismatids, basal monocots) is an informal name for a group of early branching (hence basal) monocots, consisting of two orders, the Acorales and Alismatales. The name has also been used to refer to the Alismatales alone. Monocots are frequently treated as three informal groupings based on their branching from ancestral monocots and shared characteristics: alismatid monocots, lilioid monocots (the five other non-commelinid monocots) and commelinid monocots. Research at the Royal Botanical Gardens, Kew is organised into two teams I: Alismatids and Lilioids and II: Commelinids. A similar approach is taken by Judd in his Plant systematics.

== Phylogeny ==
Cladogram showing the orders of monocots (Lilianae sensu Chase & Reveal) based on molecular phylogenetic evidence according to the Angiosperm Phylogeny Group IV (APG IV).

- Lilianae sensu Chase & Reveal
  - Acorales
  - - Alismatales
    - - Petrosaviales
      - - - Dioscoreales
          - Pandanales
        - - Liliales
          - - Asparagales
            - - Arecales
              - - Poales
                - - Zingiberales
                  - Commelinales

== Subdivision ==
Of the two orders, the Acorales is monotypic, consisting of a single family, the Acoraceae, which in turn has a single genus, Acorus with two species. By contrast, the Alismatales is a much larger grouping, with about 13 families, 165 genera and about 4,500 species.

== Bibliography ==
- Royal Botanic Gardens, Kew (2016), Monocots I: General Alismatids & Lilioids, archived from the original on 2015-09-14
- Judd, Walter S.; Campbell, Christopher S.; Kellogg, Elizabeth A.; Stevens, Peter F.; Donoghue, Michael J. (2007), Plant systematics: a phylogenetic approach. (1st ed. 1999, 2nd 2002) (3 ed.), Sinauer Associates, ISBN 978-0-87893-407-2
- Chase, Mark W; Reveal, James L (2009), "A phylogenetic classification of the land plants to accompany APG III" (PDF), Botanical Journal of the Linnean Society, 161 (2): 122–127, doi:10.1111/j.1095-8339.2009.01002.x
- Angiosperm Phylogeny Group (2016), "An update of the Angiosperm Phylogeny Group classification for the orders and families of flowering plants: APG IV", Botanical Journal of the Linnean Society, 181 (1): 1–20, doi:10.1111/boj.12385, S2CID 7498637
- POWO (2019). "Plants of the World Online". London: Royal Botanic Gardens, Kew. Archived from the original on March 22, 2017.(see also Plants of the World Online)
