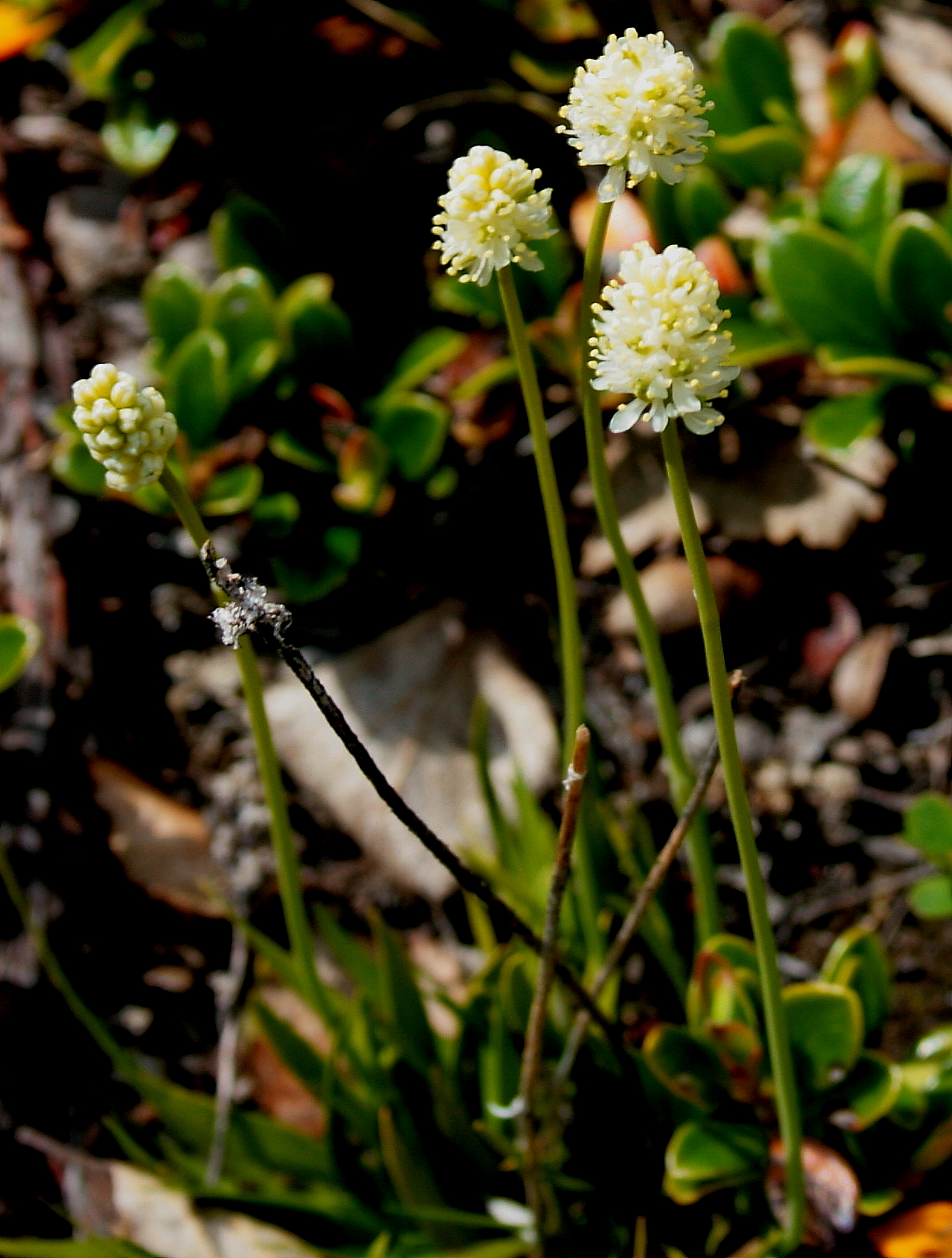
- Tofieldia pusilla

Scientific classification
- Kingdom: Plantae
- Clade: Tracheophytes
- Clade: Angiosperms
- Clade: Monocots
- Order: Alismatales
- Family: Tofieldiaceae
- Genus: Tofieldia; Huds.

Type species
- Tofieldia palustris Huds.

Synonyms
- Cymba Dulac; Asphodeliris Möhring ex Kuntze; Narthecium Gérard 1761, rejected name, not Huds. 1762 (Nartheciaceae); Heriteria ^{Schrank}; Hebelia C.C.Gmel.; Conradia Raf.; Leptilix Raf.

= Tofieldia =

Genus of flowering plants

Tofieldia is a small genus of flowering plants described as a genus in 1778. It is widespread across much of Europe, Asia, and North America.

Tofieldia was once placed in the lily family, but is now generally included in the newer family Tofieldiaceae. The genus sometimes includes species of genus Triantha. Tofieldia are rhizomatous perennial herbs with spikes or racemes of lily-like flowers.

The name Tofieldia commemorates the British botanist Thomas Tofield.

== Description ==
Green glabrous perennials from short creeping rhizomes; leaves mostly radical, 2-ranked, laterally flattened, linear; scapes slender, few-leaved or naked; racemes sometimes spikelike, the flowers small, on short pedicels, in axils of bracts, solitary or in 3’s, bracteolate; tepals 6, persistent, linear-oblong to oblanceolate, white, greenish, or brownish red; stamens 6, the filaments linear-subulate, the anthers ovate, introrse, 2-locular; ovary superior, sessile, ovoid, 3-lobed at apex, the ovules numerous; styles short, the stigma introrse; capsules septicidal, 3-locular, the seeds small, narrowly oblong, caudate at one end or without appendage. About 20 species, in the temperate and northern regions of the N. Hemisphere.

Species

- Tofieldia calyculata (L.) Wahlenb. ("German Asphodel") - much of Europe from Spain to Ukraine
- Tofieldia cernua Sm. - Siberia + Russian Far East
- Tofieldia coccinea Richardson - Russia, Mongolia, China, Japan, Korea, Alaska, Canada
- Tofieldia divergens Bureau & Franch. - China (Guizhou, Sichuan, Yunnan)
- Tofieldia furusei (Hiyama) M.N.Tamura & Fuse - Honshu
- Tofieldia glabra Nutt. - North and South Carolina
- Tofieldia himalaica Baker - Nepal, Bhutan, Sikkim, Arunachal Pradesh
- Tofieldia × hybrida A.Kern. ex Asch. & Graebn. - Austrian and Italian Alps
- Tofieldia nuda Maxim. - Honshu, Kyushu
- Tofieldia okuboi Makino - Japan, Kuril Islands
- Tofieldia pusilla (Michx.) Pers. ("Scottish Asphodel") - Subarctic + Subalpine Europe, Asia and North America
- Tofieldia thibetica Franch. - Guizhou, Sichuan, Yunnan
- Tofieldia yoshiiana Makino - Korea, Japan

== Use in systems of traditional medicine ==
At least three species of Tofieldia have been used in traditional medicine:

- T. pusilla was used in Scotland to treat a variety of ailments, including skin conditions, respiratory problems, and digestive issues. The plant's roots have been used to make a tea believed to have a soothing effect on the stomach and intestines.
- T. thibetica is one of the frequently-used ingredients in poly-herbal alcoholic extracts used topically to treat herpes, shingles, wounds, and snake bites. by the Naxi people of the Hengduan Mountains of Northwestern Yunnan. This species has also been recorded (under the older synonym of T. iridacea Franch.) as one the medicinal plants of Mount Emei (in Sichuan) : a decoction of the plant has been used locally as an emmenagogue and a remedy for leukorrhea, although it is not used in mainstream Chinese medicine.

== Use in folk magic ==
In Scotland, the species T. pusilla (under the honorific common name of "King's Knot") was formerly believed to have apotropaic powers. For this reason, it was often deliberately planted near homes and farms to ward off evil spirits and bring good luck.

== Ornamental use ==
The European T. calyculata and the American species formerly known as T. racemosa (now correctly known as Triantha racemosa) have both occasionally been cultivated as ornamentals, while T. pusilla has been deemed too small and easily overlooked to have any garden value.

== Toxicity when raw ==
The acridity and potential toxicity of Tofieldia spp., when raw, may be accounted for by the fact that the genus, like other basal monocots (including, most notably, the related plant family Araceae) contains calcium oxalate crystals, present, in the case of Tofieldia, arranged in druses and as cuboidal crystals, rather than the raphides more usual in the Araceae. In this connection, it may be noted that the species T. pusilla, when used in Scottish traditional medicine is prepared as a herbal tea and thus subjected to both heat and steeping - both of which are used in the preparation of calcium oxalate-containing plants for food, as a means of eliminating the irritating oxalate crystals - most notably in the case of the popular tropical vegetable taro.

== Gallery ==
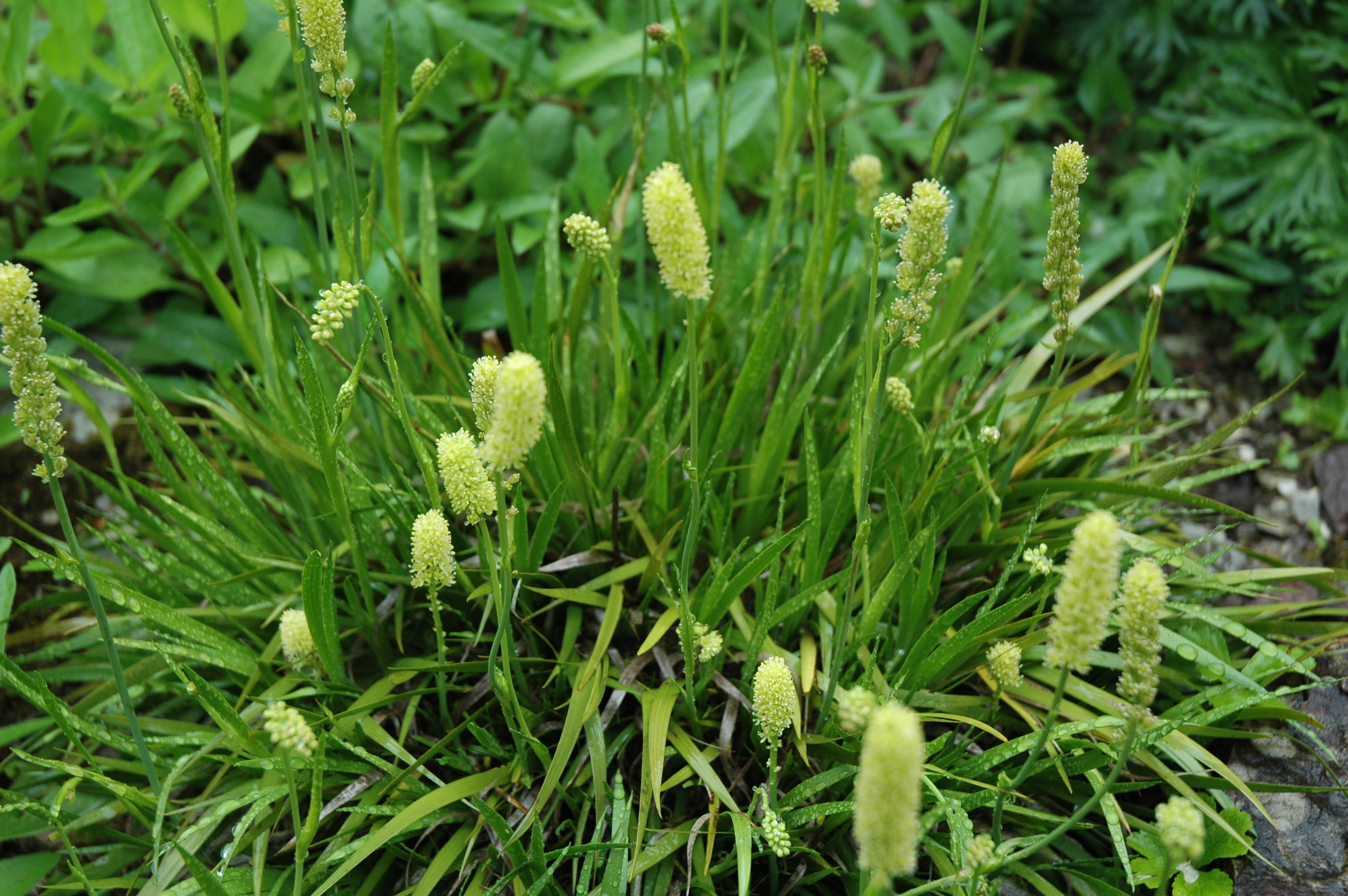
T. calyculata, "German asphodel"

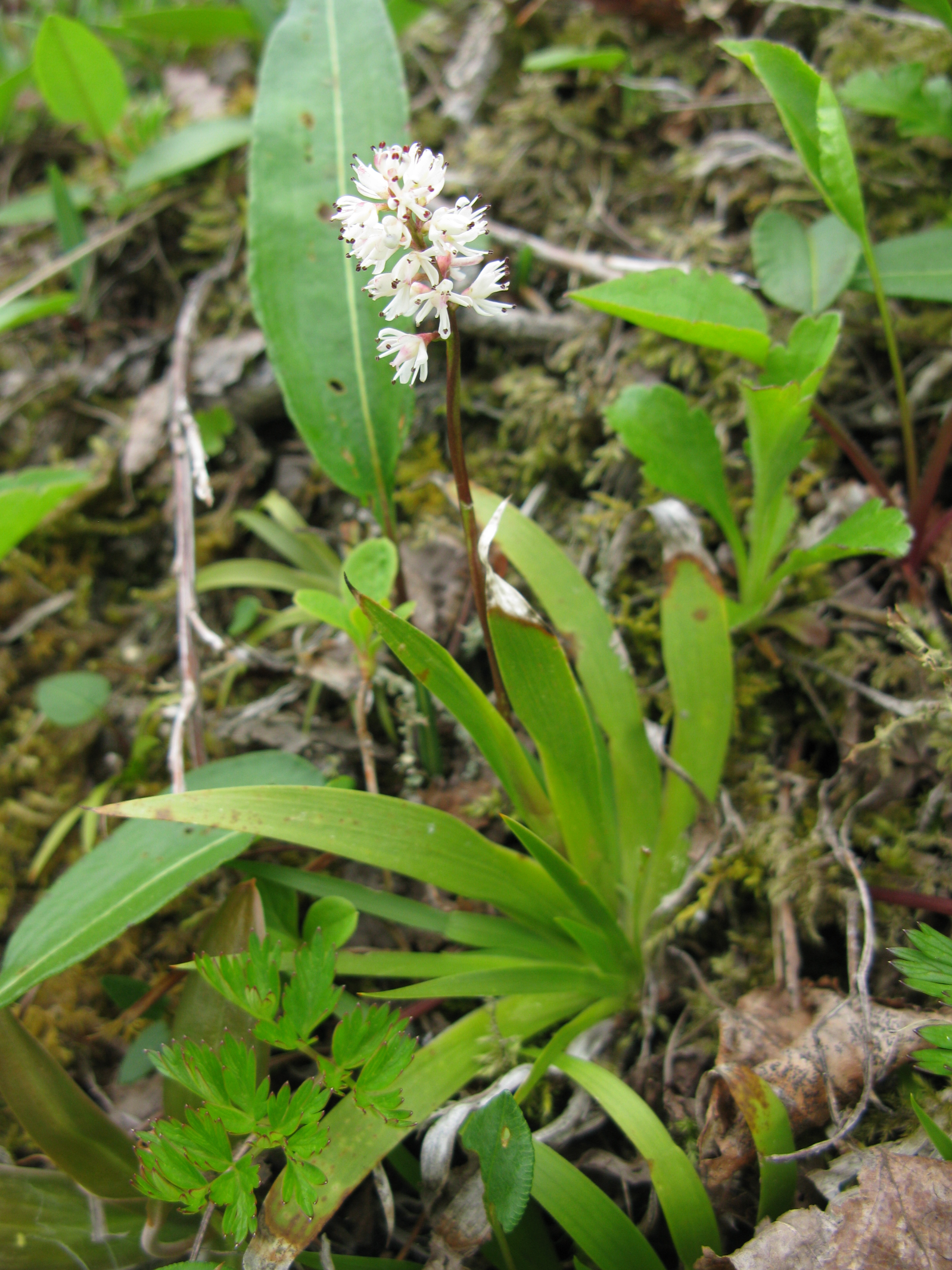
T. coccinea flowering in Japan

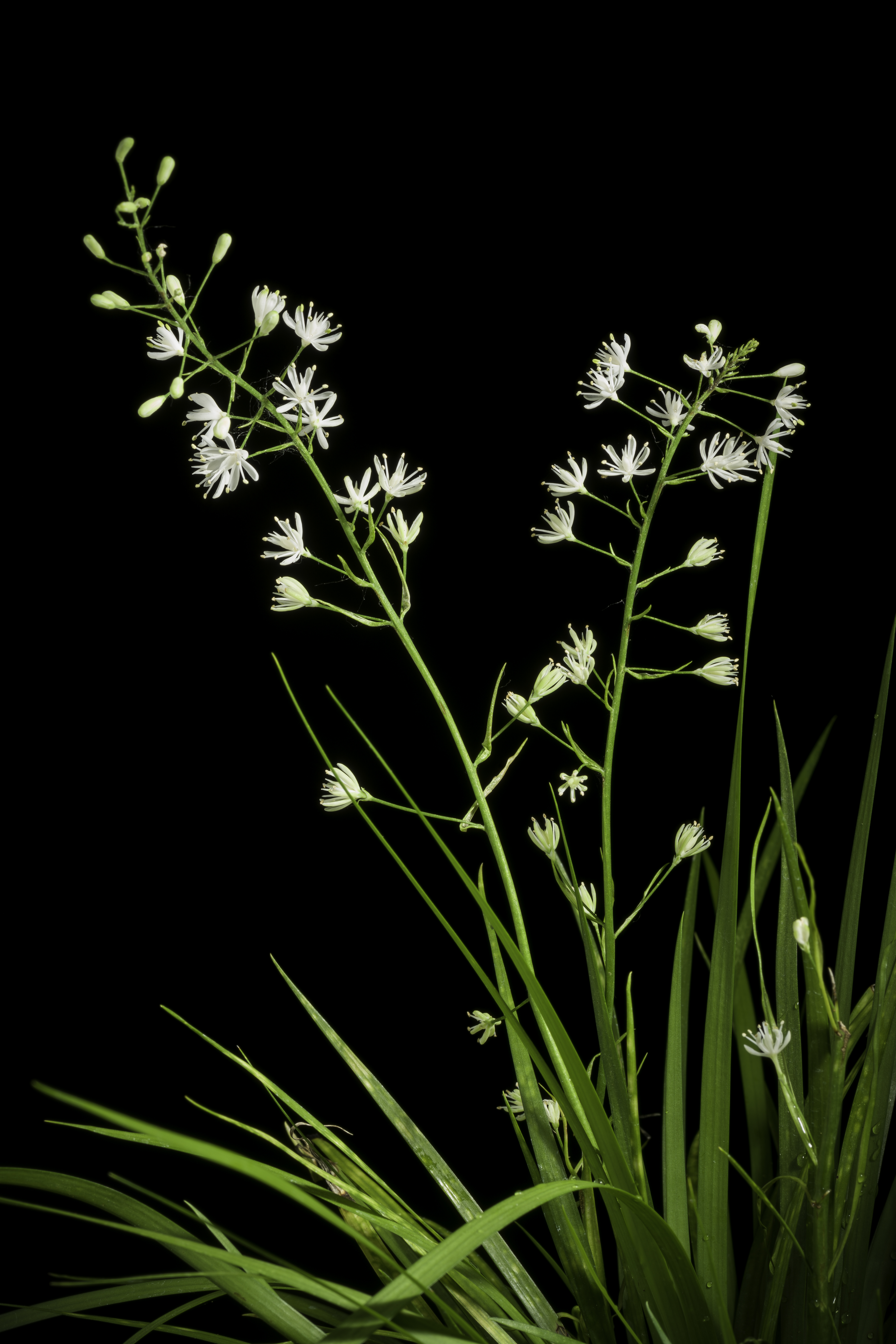
T. furusei

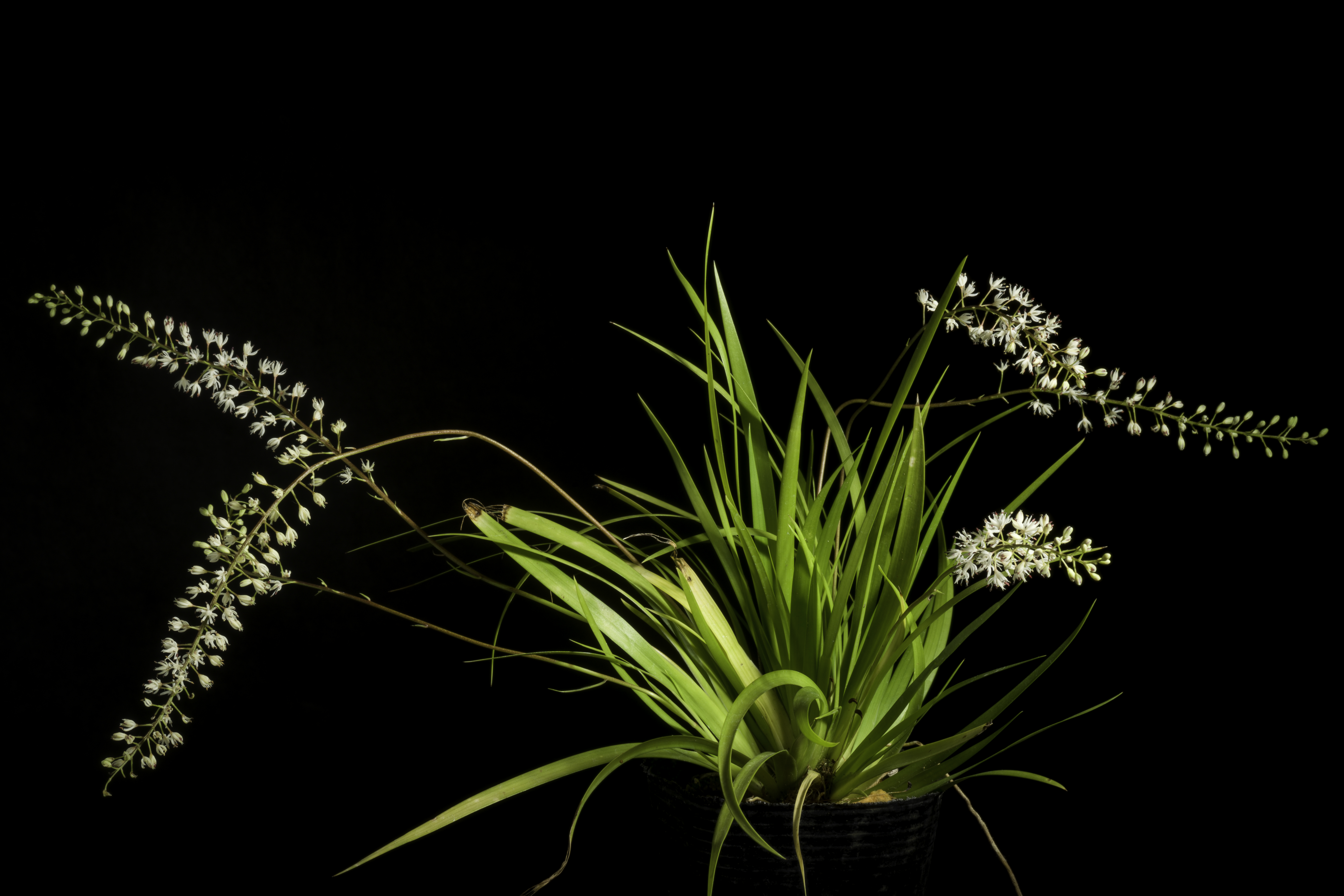
T. nuda cv. 'Kurokami'

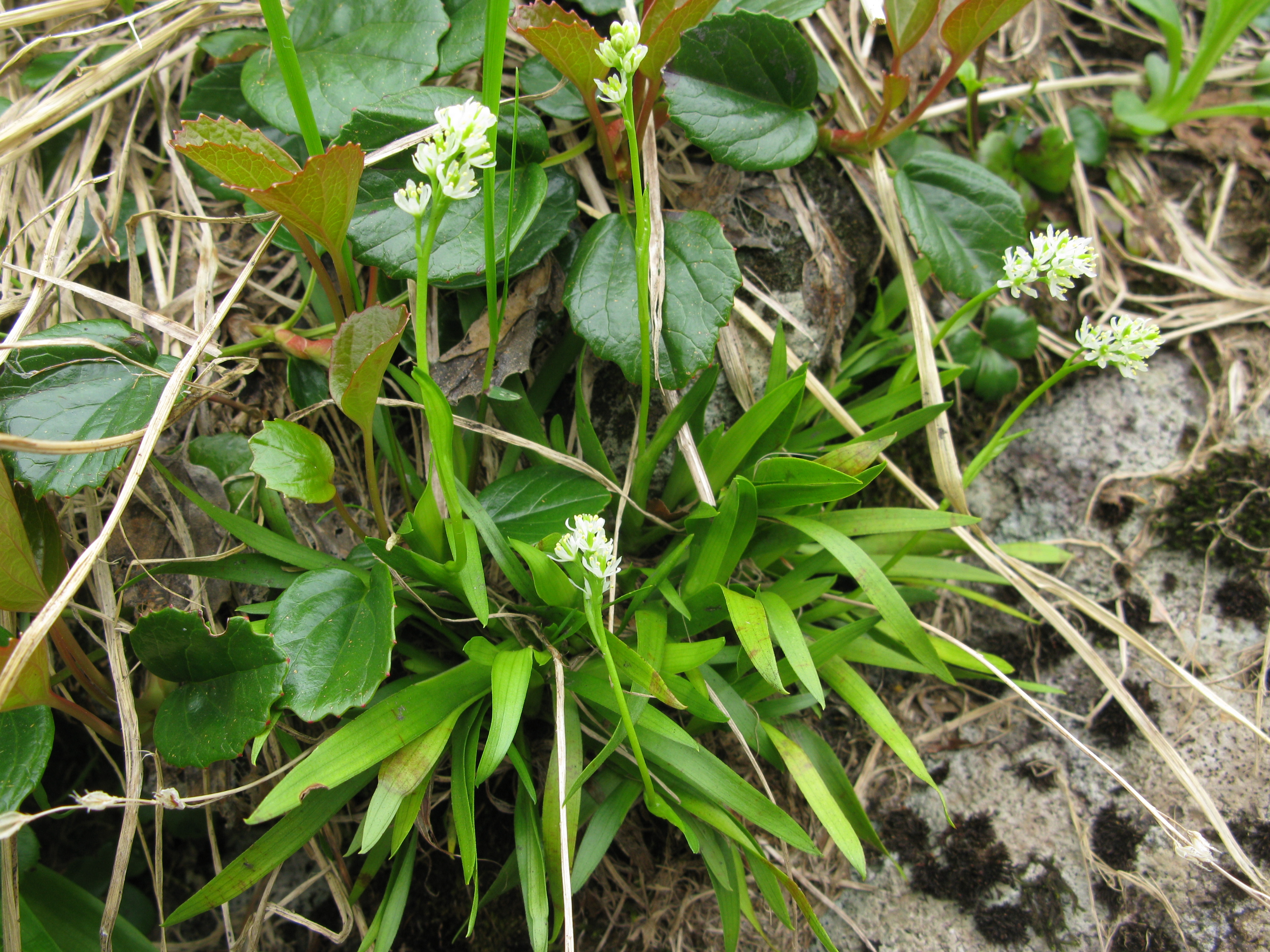
T. okuboi flowering in Japan
