= Laurence Joseph Dorr =

American botanist and plant collector

Laurence Joseph Dorr (born September 18, 1953) is an American botanist and plant collector. He specializes in the systematics of the order Malvales and the family Ericaceae.

== Biography ==
In 1971 Dorr graduated from Roxbury Latin School and matriculated at Washington University in St. Louis. By his junior year, he took a break for a year, hiked the entire Appalachian Trail in five months, and then went plant collecting in British Columbia and Alaska. In 1976 he received a bachelor's degree in earth sciences and planetology from Washington University in St. Louis. In 1980 he received a master's degree in botany from the University of North Carolina at Chapel Hill. In 1983 he received a Ph.D. From University of Texas at Austin with dissertation "The Systematics and Evolution of the Genus Callirhoe (Malvaceae)".

Having received ... a Ph.D. from the University of Texas, Austin (where he met his wife, Lisa Barnett, who is also a botanist), Dorr worked three years in Madagascar for the Missouri Botanical Garden, returning briefly to Austin so his wife could complete her Ph.D. Then the New York Botanical Garden offered Dorr a job in the Andes; for the next five years, Dorr and Barnett divided time among New York, Venezuela, Ecuador, and Bolivia.

He set up a program of research and exploration in Madagascar for the Missouri Botanical Garden from 1983 to 1986, was a lecturer in organismal biology at the University of Texas at Austin in 1987, and explored for plants in the northern Andes for the New York Botanical Garden from 1988 to 1991. At the Smithsonian Institution's National Museum of Natural History, he became in 1991 an associate curator in the botany department as an associate curator. There he works on systematic botany and floristic accounts of Malvales and Ericaceae, biocomplexity of flora of the northern Andes, and history of botanical investigation in Madagascar and neighboring islands, as well as natural history during the 19th century in the United States.

Dorr and his colleagues have done considerable work in improving the U.S. National Herbarium. He was from 1992 to 1996 editor-in-chief of the ASPT Newsletter. He has served on the editorial boards of BioLlania, BioScience, Brittonia, Flora Neotropica, and Taxon. He is the author or coauthor of over 100 scientific articles and has written or edited several books. Eleven plant species are named in his honor. His elder son often accompanied him on collecting expeditions.

Laurence J. Dorr married Lisa Ceryle Barnett in 1984. They have two sons.

== Selected publications ==
=== Articles ===
- Dorr, Laurence J. (1981). "The Pollination Ecology of Zenobia (Ericaceae)". American Journal of Botany. 68 (10): 1325–1332. Bibcode:1981AmJB...68.1325D. doi:10.1002/j.1537-2197.1981.tb07843.x.
- Dorr, Laurence J.; Barnett, Lisa C. (1989). "A Revision of Melochia Section Physodium (Sterculiaceae) from Mexico". Brittonia. 41 (4): 404. Bibcode:1989Britt..41..404D. doi:10.2307/2807556. JSTOR 2807556. S2CID 38193383.
- Luteyn, James L.; Judd, Walter S.; Vander Kloet, Sam P.; Dorr, Laurence J.; Wallace, Gary D.; Kron, Kathleen A.; Stevens, Peter F.; Clemants, Steven E. (1996). "Ericaceae of the Southeastern United States". Castanea. 61 (2): 101–144. JSTOR 4033868.
- Dorr, L. J. (1999). "Notes on Begonia (Begoniaceae) in the Venezuelan Andes". Harvard Papers in Botany. 4 (1): 253–264. JSTOR 41761305.
- Dorr, Laurence J.; Stergios, Basil; Smith, Alan R.; Cuello a., Nidia L.; Strong, M. T.; Reznicek, A.; Feuillet, C. (2000). "Catalogue of the Vascular Plants of Guaramacal National Park, Portuguesa and Trujillo States, Venezuela". Contributions from the United States National Herbarium. 40: 1–155. JSTOR 23493174.
- Marhold, Karol; Stuessy, Tod; Agababian, Mariam; Agosti, Donat; Alford, Mac H.; Crespo, Ana; Crisci, Jorge V.; Dorr, Laurence J.; Ferencová, Zuzana; Frodin, David; Geltman, Dmitry V.; Kilian, Norbert; Linder, H. Peter; Lohmann, Lucia G.; Oberprieler, Christoph; Penev, Lyubomir; Smith, Gideon F.; Thomas, Wayt; Tulig, Melissa; Turland, Nicholas; Zhang, Xian-Chun (2013). "The Future of Botanical Monography: Report from an international workshop, 12-16 March 2012, Smolenice, Slovak Republic". Taxon. 62 (1): 4–20. Bibcode:2013Taxon..62....4M. doi:10.1002/tax.621003. hdl:2263/37251.
- Wen, Jun; Ickert-Bond, Stefanie M.; Appelhans, Marc S.; Dorr, Laurence J.; Funk, Vicki A. (2015). "Collections-based systematics: Opportunities and outlook for 2050". Journal of Systematics and Evolution. 53 (6): 477–488. Bibcode:2015JSyEv..53..477W. doi:10.1111/jse.12181. ISSN 1674-4918. S2CID 83558717.
- Jiménez-Mejías, Pedro; Martinetto, Edoardo; Soldano, Adriano; Dorr, Laurence J. (2019). "The problematic history of the name Carex elata All. (Cyperaceae) and its neotypification". Taxon. 68 (3): 580–583. Bibcode:2019Taxon..68..580J. doi:10.1002/tax.12088. S2CID 201211775.

=== Books ===
- Laurence J. Dorr (1997). Plant Collectors in Madagascar and the Comoro Islands: A Biographical and Bibliographical Guide to Individuals and Groups who Have Collected Herbarium Material of Algae, Bryophytes, Fungi, Lichens, and Vascular Plants in Madagascar and the Comoro Islands. Royal Botanic Gardens, Kew. ISBN 978-1-900347-18-1.
