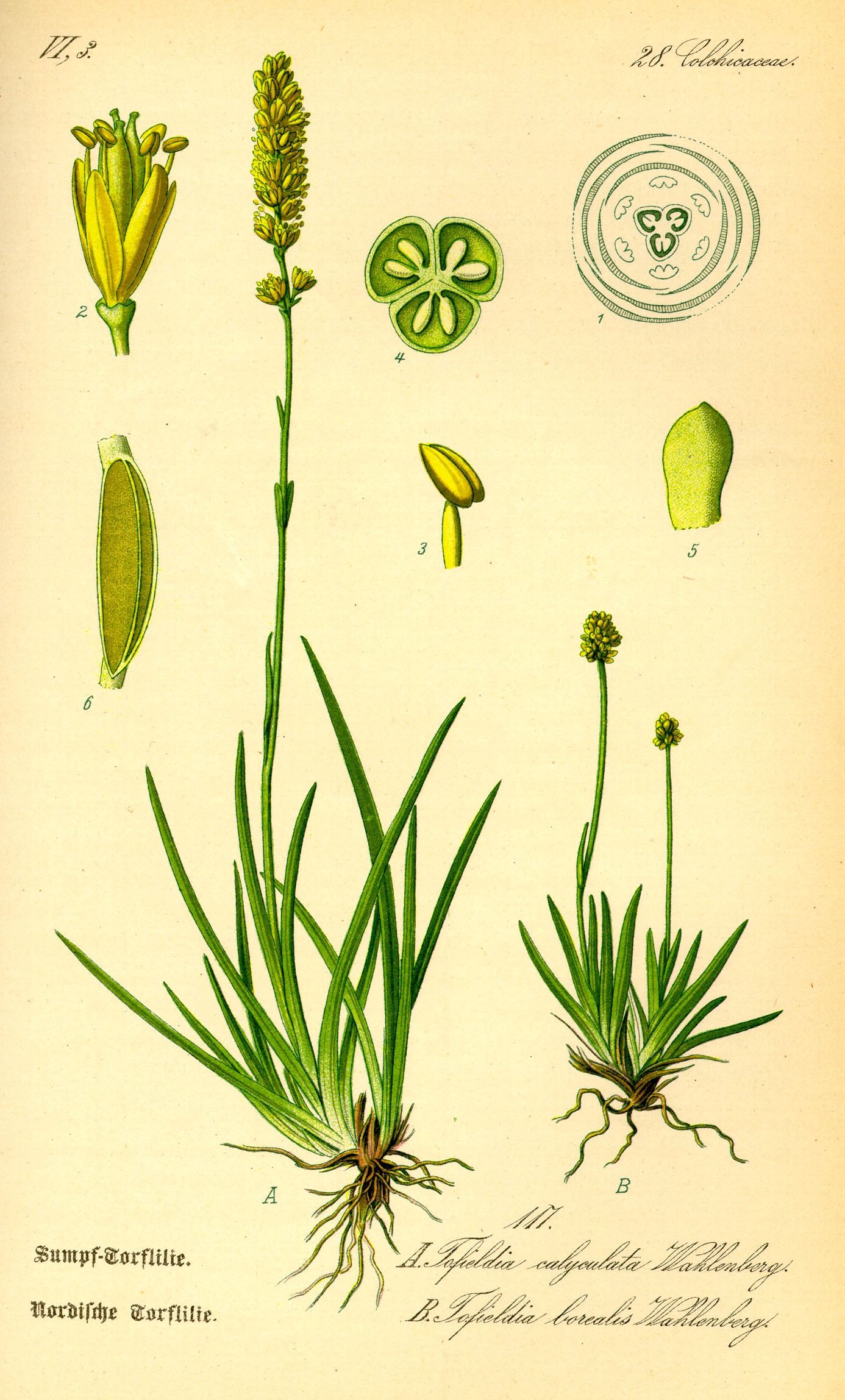
- 2 species of Tofieldia from: Thomé (1885)

Scientific classification
- Kingdom: Plantae
- Clade: Embryophytes
- Clade: Tracheophytes
- Clade: Spermatophytes
- Clade: Angiosperms
- Clade: Monocots
- Order: Alismatales
- Family: Tofieldiaceae; Takht.

= Tofieldiaceae =

Family of flowering plants

Tofieldiaceae is a family of flowering plants in the monocot order Alismatales. The family is divided into four genera, which together comprise 28 known species (Christenhusz & Byng 2016). They are small, herbaceous plants, mostly of arctic and subarctic regions, but a few extend further south, and one genus is endemic to northern South America and Florida. Tofieldia pusilla is sometimes grown as an ornamental.

William Hudson (1730-1793) named Tofieldia for the British botanist Thomas Tofield (1730–1779). The family Tofieldiaceae was erected by Armen Takhtajan in 1995. Molecular phylogenetic studies of DNA sequences have shown it to be the second diverging clade in Alismatales, after the most basal clade, the family Araceae. Before the segregation of Tofieldiaceae was confirmed by cladistic methods, its genera had usually been assigned to Nartheciaceae, Liliaceae, or Melanthiaceae. Tofieldiaceae is recognized by the Angiosperm Phylogeny Group in their APG III system of plant classification.

The circumscription of genera in Tofieldiaceae has been controversial. Many authors do not recognize Triantha as a separate genus from Tofieldia. A few authors have sunk other genera into Tofieldia as well. A phylogenetic analysis, based on two nuclear genes and ten chloroplast genes, has confirmed that all five of the genera are monophyletic and that Triantha and Tofieldia are close sister taxa.

== Description ==
Tofieldiaceae are small herbaceous perennials. The leaves are equitant (distichous and overlapping), and unifacial. A calyculus is present. The inflorescence is a raceme. The tepals are free. The fruit is a capsule, which is usually septicidal.

== Genera ==
- Harperocallis McDaniel
- Pleea Michx.
- Tofieldia Huds.
- Triantha (Nutt.) Baker
- †Dicolpopollis

== Phylogeny ==
The following phylogenetic tree is based on a DNA paper that was published in 2011, modified to accommodate the transfer of the species in Isidrogalvia to Harperocallis.

- Tofieldiaceae
  - Pleea
  - - Harperocallis
    - - Triantha
      - Tofieldia
