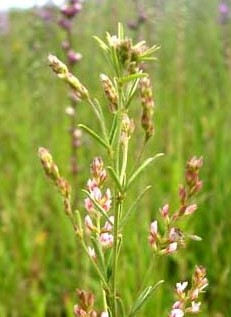

Conservation status
- Vulnerable (NatureServe)

- Threatened (ESA)

Scientific classification
- Kingdom: Plantae
- Clade: Embryophytes
- Clade: Tracheophytes
- Clade: Spermatophytes
- Clade: Angiosperms
- Clade: Eudicots
- Clade: Rosids
- Order: Fabales
- Family: Fabaceae
- Subfamily: Faboideae
- Genus: Lespedeza
- Species: L. leptostachya

Binomial name
- Lespedeza leptostachya Engelm. ex A.Gray (1877)

Synonyms
- Despeleza leptostachya (Engelm. ex A. Gray) Nieuwl. (1914)

= Lespedeza leptostachya =

Species of plant

Lespedeza leptostachya is a rare species of flowering plant in the legume family known by the common names prairie lespedeza and prairie bush-clover. It occurs in the Upper Midwest region of the United States. The flowers are creamy-white to purplish and arranged into a narrow terminal spikes.

== Description ==
Lespedeza leptostachya is a long-lived perennial herb growing up to a meter tall. The pubescent leaves are compound, each made up of three linear or linear-oblong shaped leaflets. The herbage is coated in whitish hairs, giving the plant a silvery look. The inflorescence is a terminal spike of cream to yellowish or pale pink flowers. Each flower is only half a centimeter long. There are both cleistogamous flowers which never open, and chasmogamous flowers which open and allow insects inside; both types produce seed. Blooming occurs in July through September, with peak bloom in mid-July. The plant does not produce flowers until its maturity at the age of 6 to 9 years. The fruit is a legume pod. One plant can produce over 500 pods, however, many of them contain no viable seeds.

== Distribution and habitat ==
It is endemic to the Upper Midwest, where it occurs in the Upper Mississippi Valley in the states of Minnesota, Iowa, Wisconsin, and Illinois. Most occurrences are in northern Iowa and southern Minnesota, and it is rare across its known range. It is federally listed as a threatened species in the US.

Lespedeza leptostachya grows only in the tallgrass prairie, mainly in dry areas. The soils may be gravelly, sandy, and/or calcareous, and are generally well-drained. It prefers sloped areas that are north-facing. It is found in association with other plants including big bluestem (Andropogon gerardi), little bluestem (Schizachyrium scoparium), yellow Indian grass (Sorghastrum nutans), side-oats grama (Bouteloua curtipendula), prairie dropseed (Sporobolus heterolepis), porcupine grass (Stipa spartea), Penn sedge (Carex pennsylvanica), copper-shouldered sedge (Carex bicknellii), sand-bracted sedge (Carex muhlenbergii), flowering spurge (Euphorbia corollata), prairie phlox (Phlox pilosa), lead plant (Amorpha canescens), rough blazing star (Liatris aspera), purple prairie clover (Dalea purpurea), showy goldenrod (Solidago speciosa), grass-leaved goldenrod (S. graminifolia), prairie gentian (Gentiana puberulenta), hoary puccoon (Lithospermum canescens), blue-eyed grass (Sisyrinchium albidum), cream wild indigo (Baptisia leucophaea), flax-leaved aster (Ionactis linariifolius), silky aster (Symphyotrichum sericeum), pale prairie coneflower (Echinacea pallida), milkwort (Polygala polygama), prairie violet (Viola pedatifida), and bird's foot violet (Viola pedata). It can be found alongside its relative, Lespedeza capitata (which has shorter and dense flower spikes and wider leaflets), and it has been known to hybridize with it producing plants that have intermediate flower spike lengths and leaf widths, though this is rare.

== Conservation ==
There are 32 to 36 occurrences of the plant remaining in widely scattered locations, and most populations are small, containing fewer than 150 individuals. There are many more historical occurrences which no longer exist. The plant is threatened by the loss and degradation of its prairie habitat. Much of it has been consumed for development and converted to agriculture. The prevention of agents of natural disturbance, such as wildfire and the grazing of wild ungulates, has allowed ecological succession to occur, turning native prairie to shrubland. The plant does not compete well with woody shrubs. The plant can tolerate an amount of disturbance, and probably requires it; it was likely adapted to a landscape regularly trampled and grazed by bison.

Other threats include quarry mining, herbicides and surface runoff, mowing, and weeds. Heavy herbivory by insects and small mammals has been observed on the plants, including invasion of the pods by beetles. The plant does not reproduce until at least its sixth year, and when it does reproduce, it usually self-fertilizes, contributing to a low genetic diversity in populations.

The plant has been reintroduced at one site in Iowa. As the plant probably benefited from the presence of bison, researchers are putting cattle on one site to test the effects of their grazing.
