= Wilbur Howard Duncan =

American botanist

- Born: October 15, 1910; Buffalo, New York, United States
- Died: March 25, 2005 (aged 94)
- Education: Indiana University Bloomington, Duke University
- Scientific career
- Fields: botanist
- Author abbrev. (botany): W.H.Duncan

Wilbur Howard Duncan (October 15, 1910 – March 25, 2005) was a botany professor at the University of Georgia for 40 years where he oversaw an expansion in the school's herbarium collection and described three new plant species. Duncan also authored several books on plant species of the Eastern and Southeastern United States.

== Biography ==
Duncan was born in Buffalo, New York, on October 15, 1910. He attend Bloomington High School in Indiana. He received his bachelor's and master's degrees, in 1932 and 1933, from Indiana University Bloomington, then his PhD in botany from Duke University in 1938. He then began a forty-year period in the faculty at the University of Georgia. As Curator of the UGA Herbarium, he increased the collection size from 16,000 to 135,000 specimens. He personally collected over thirty thousand specimens, which he shared with herbaria across the country.

During World War II, Duncan served in the United States Public Health Service, in which he earned the rank of Major. His duties during this period included directing mosquito control for Charleston, South Carolina and serving as state entomologist for Kentucky.

Duncan was married for 64 years (from 1941 until his death) to botanist Marion Bennett Duncan, with whom he collaborated on several books, including Wildflowers of the Eastern United States.

== Species described ==
Duncan is the botanical authority who first described three plant species: Quercus oglethorpensis, Trillium persistens, and Baptisia arachnifera. All of these species are endangered.

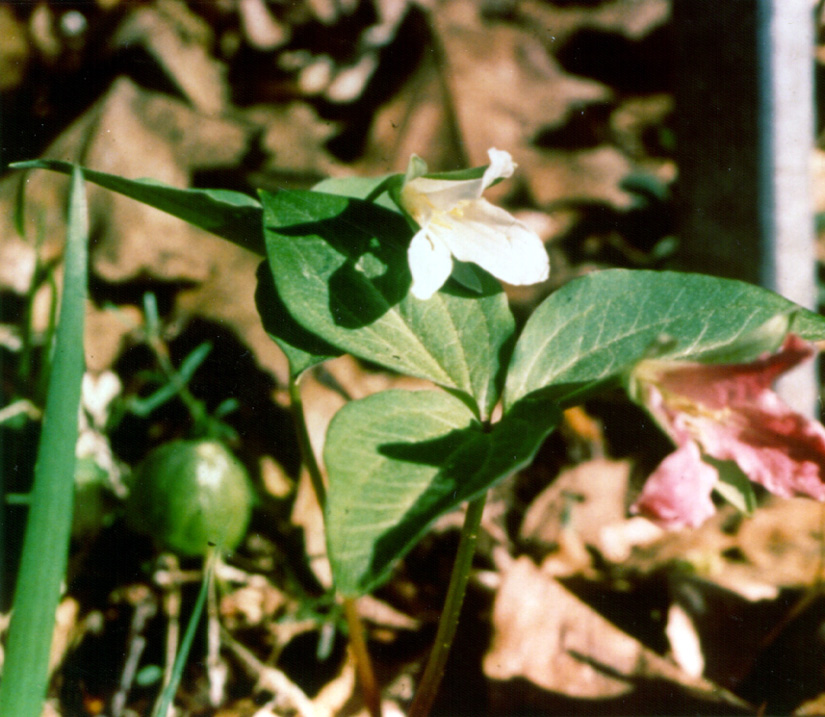
Trillium persistens

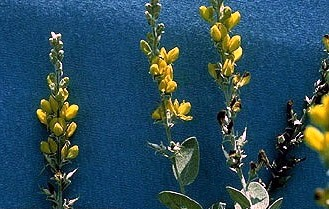
Baptisia arachnifera

== Associations and honors ==
Duncan was a Fellow of the American Association for the Advancement of Science.

== Partial bibliography ==
- Duncan, W. H. 1940. A new species of oak from Georgia. Amer. Midland Naturalist 24: pages 755–756.
- Duncan, Wilbur H. (1941). Guide to Georgia Trees. Athens, Georgia: University of Georgia Press. p. 63. ISBN 0-8203-2271-7. OCLC 1107690.
- Duncan, W. H. 1944. A new species of Baptisia. Rhodora 46: pages 29–31.
- Duncan, W. H. 1950. Quercus oglethorpensis – range extensions and phylogenetic relationships. Lloydia 13: pages 243–248.
- Duncan, W. H., J. F. Garst, and G. A. Neece. 1971. Trillium persistens (Liliaceae), a new pedicellate-flowered species form northeastern Georgia and adjacent North Carolina. Rhodora 73: pages 244–248.
- Duncan, Wilbur H. (1975). Woody Vines of the Southeastern United States. Athens, Georgia: University of Georgia Press. p. 84. ISBN 978-0-8203-0348-2.
- Duncan, Wilbur H.; Leonard E. Foote (1975). Wildflowers of the Southeastern United States. Athens, Georgia: The University of Georgia Press. pp. 296. ISBN 0-8203-0347-X.
- Duncan, W. H. 1977. A new species of Galactia (Fabaceae) in the southeastern United States. Phytologia 37: pages 59–61.
- Duncan, Wilbur H. & John T. Kartesz, Vascular Flora of Georgia: An Annotated Checklist, 1981, UGA Press
- Duncan, Wilbur H. (1982). The Vascular Vegetation of Sapelo Island, Georgia. Athens, Georgia and Atlanta, Georgia: Botany Department, University of Georgia and Georgia Department of Natural Resources. p. 75. OCLC 8822120.
- Duncan, Wilbur H.; Marion B. Duncan (1988). Trees of the Southeastern United States. Athens, Georgia: The University of Georgia Press. pp. 322. ISBN 0-8203-0954-0.
- Duncan, Wilbur H. & Marion B. Duncan, The Smithsonian Guide to Seaside Plants of the Gulf and Atlantic Coasts, 140 pp, Smithsonian, 1987, ISBN 978-0-87474-387-6
- Duncan, Wilbur H.; Marion B. Duncan (March 2005). Wildflowers of the Eastern United States. Athens, Georgia: University of Georgia Press. p. 380. ISBN 0-8203-2747-6.

== See also ==
- List of University of Georgia people
