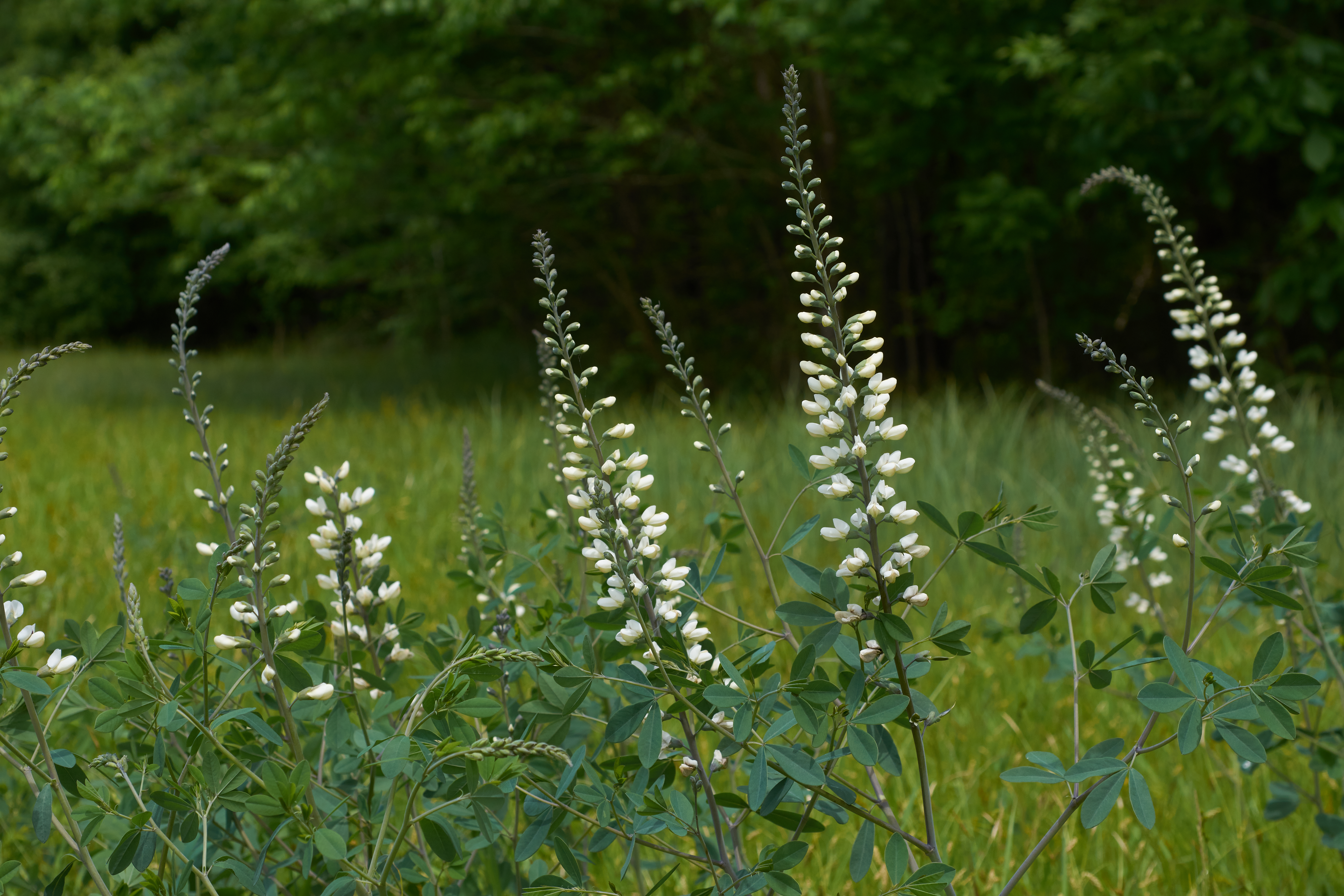
- Baptisia alba var. macrophylla
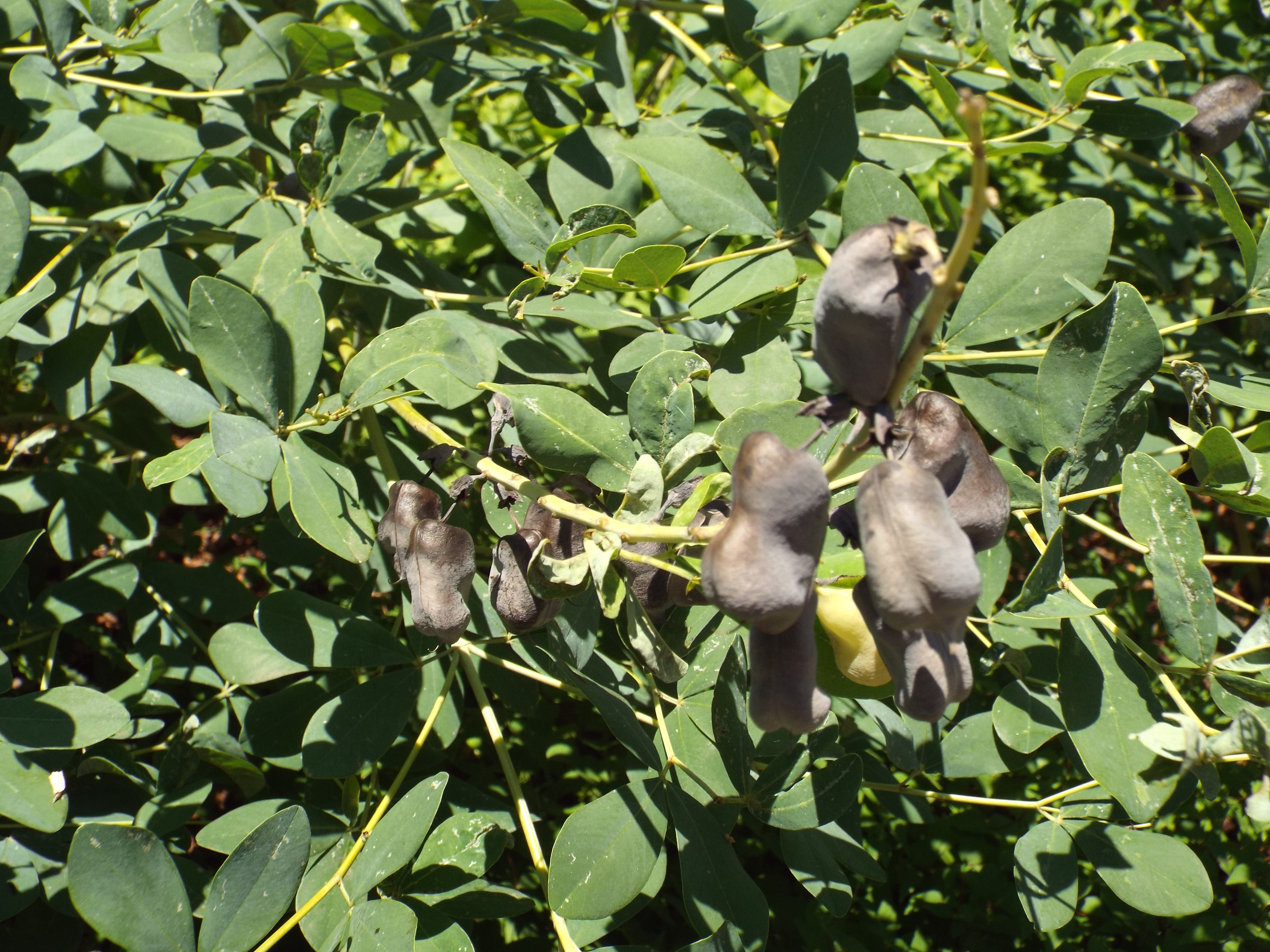
- Baptisia alba var. alba

Scientific classification
- Kingdom: Plantae
- Clade: Tracheophytes
- Clade: Angiosperms
- Clade: Eudicots
- Clade: Rosids
- Order: Fabales
- Family: Fabaceae
- Subfamily: Faboideae
- Genus: Baptisia
- Species: B. alba

Binomial name
- Baptisia alba (L.) Vent.

Synonyms
- Baptisia lactea (Raf.) Thieret; Baptisia leucantha Torr. & Gray; Baptisia pendula var. macrophylla Larisey

= Baptisia alba =

Species of legume

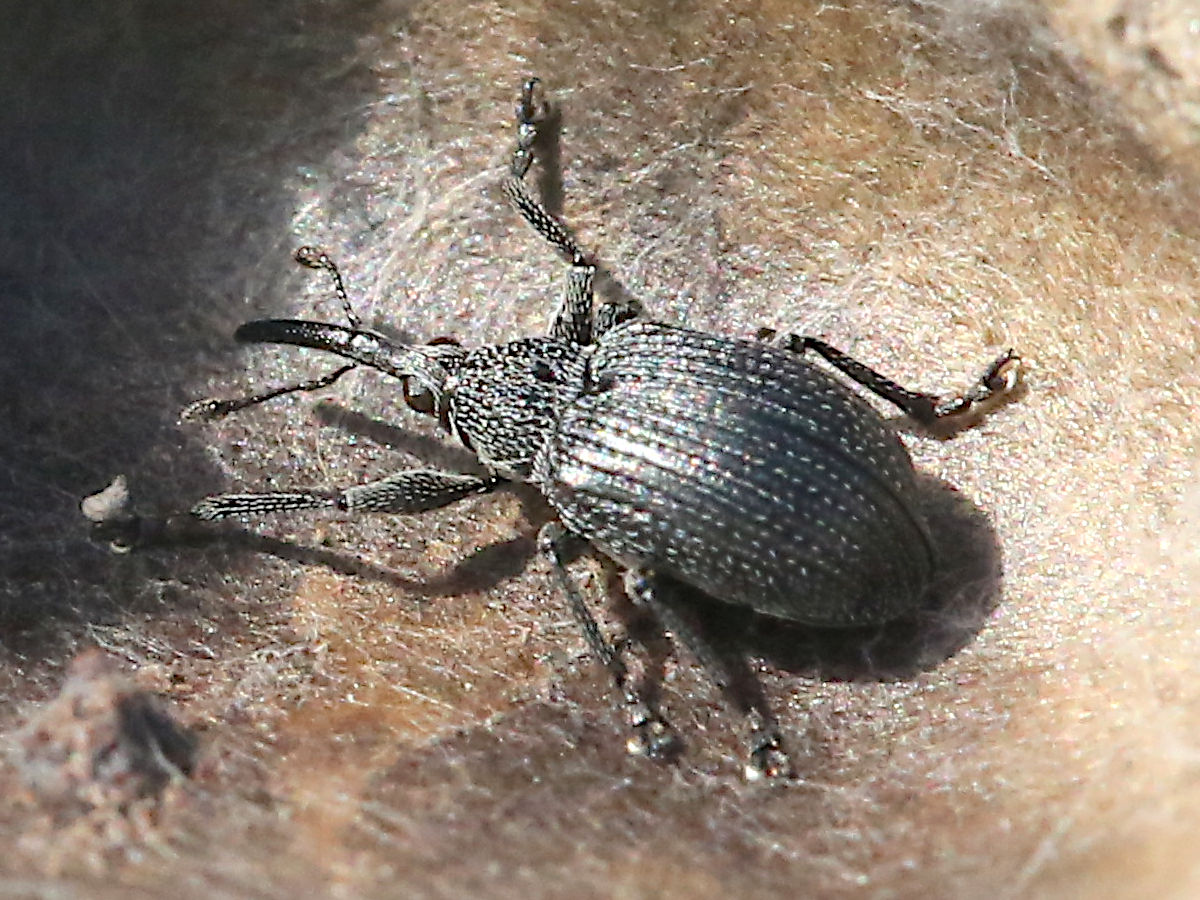
Baptisia alba Seed Pod Weevil larvae inside of plant legume. Baptisia Seed Pod Weevil (Trichapion rostrum)

Baptisia alba, commonly called white wild indigo or white false indigo, is a herbaceous perennial plant in the bean family Fabaceae. It is native in central and eastern North America, and is typically found in open woodland areas and prairies with tall grasslands.

The plant is typically 2 to 3 feet (0.61 to 0.91 m) tall, but can be taller, with white, pealike flowers.

There are two varieties, Baptisia alba var. alba and Baptisia alba var. macrophylla.

== Description ==
Leaves have alternate arrangement, and are trifoliate, narrow, and oblong. The leaves are compound and share a common stalk. White flowers occur from a long spike inflorescence. The white flowers that bloom from the spike inflorescence are paplilonaceous flowers which are identifiable by their irregular shape and five flower petals that have bilateral symmetry. Blooming occurs from April to July, earlier in the southern part of the range. The species is native to grasslands, but is grown in some gardens. It can also be found in disturbed habitats, such as along roadsides, hiking trails, and railways. It favors moist soils.

Baptisia alba var. alba (syn. B. pendula) can be differentiated from B. alba var. macrophylla (syn. B. lactea and B. leucantha) on the basis that the former occurs only in the southeastern US and has fruits that hang downward when ripe.

Baptisia alba is described as a facultative upland plant in all parts of its range.

== Ecology ==
B. alba is a host plant for caterpillars of the wild indigo duskywing butterfly and the indigo stem borer moth. Bumblebees pollinate the flowers.

Baptisia alba is insect pollinated and is recorded to have been visited in northern Florida by the bee species Andrena hilaris, Augochloropsis metallica, Bombus griseocollis, Bombus impatiens, Bombus pensylvanicus, Eucera dubitata, Habropoda laboriosa, Hoplitis pilosifrons, Hoplitis truncata, Lasioglossum reticulatum, Lasioglossum trigeminum, Lasioglossum weemsi/leviense, Megachile georgica, Megachile mucida, Megachile pseudobrevis, Osmia inspergens, and Osmia sandhouseae.

== Predation ==
One of the main predators and factors in the reproduction of B. alba are the weevil Trichapion rostrum, commonly referred to as the Wild Indigo Weevil, or Baptisia Seed Pod Weevil which are a type of beetle with an elongated snout that predate on the pre-dispersed B. alba seeds. The weevils utilize the B. alba flowers and seeds by inserting their eggs into the fruit of the B. alba plant by creating an opening at the base and pushing their eggs into the fruit itself where they feed on the seeds of the plant until they develop and emerge from the fruit. The weevils can be found on the pods of the B. alba, inserting their eggs, just before their pods open up and begin to bloom. The inserted weevil offspring uses the seeds of the B. alba pod while they grow inside the pod until they reach full development. The seed production of B. alba is impacted by seed predation which can cause B. alba to abort damaged fruits that are frequented by predators in order to give more nutrients to healthier seed pods to increase their chance of survival.

== Toxicity ==
The species can be fatal to cows that ingest the plant. It can cause irritation to humans and is possibly poisonous.
