= Euxoa catenula =

Scientific classification
- Kingdom: Animalia
- Phylum: Arthropoda
- Class: Insecta
- Order: Lepidoptera
- Superfamily: Noctuoidea
- Family: Noctuidae
- Genus: Euxoa
- Species: E. catenula

Binomial name
- Euxoa catenula Grote, 1879

Synonyms
- Agrotis catenula; Porosagrotis catenula; Carneades contagionis; Euxoa lindseyi

Species of moth

Euxoa catenula is a species of moth of the family Noctuidae first described by Augustus Radcliffe Grote in 1879. It is found in North America from southern Saskatchewan west to southern Vancouver Island, south to Kansas, New Mexico, Arizona and southern California.

The wingspan is 34–37 mm. Adults are on wing from August to September.

The larvae feed on Oxytropis, Melilotus alba, Lupinus, Salsola kali and Viola pedatifida.
