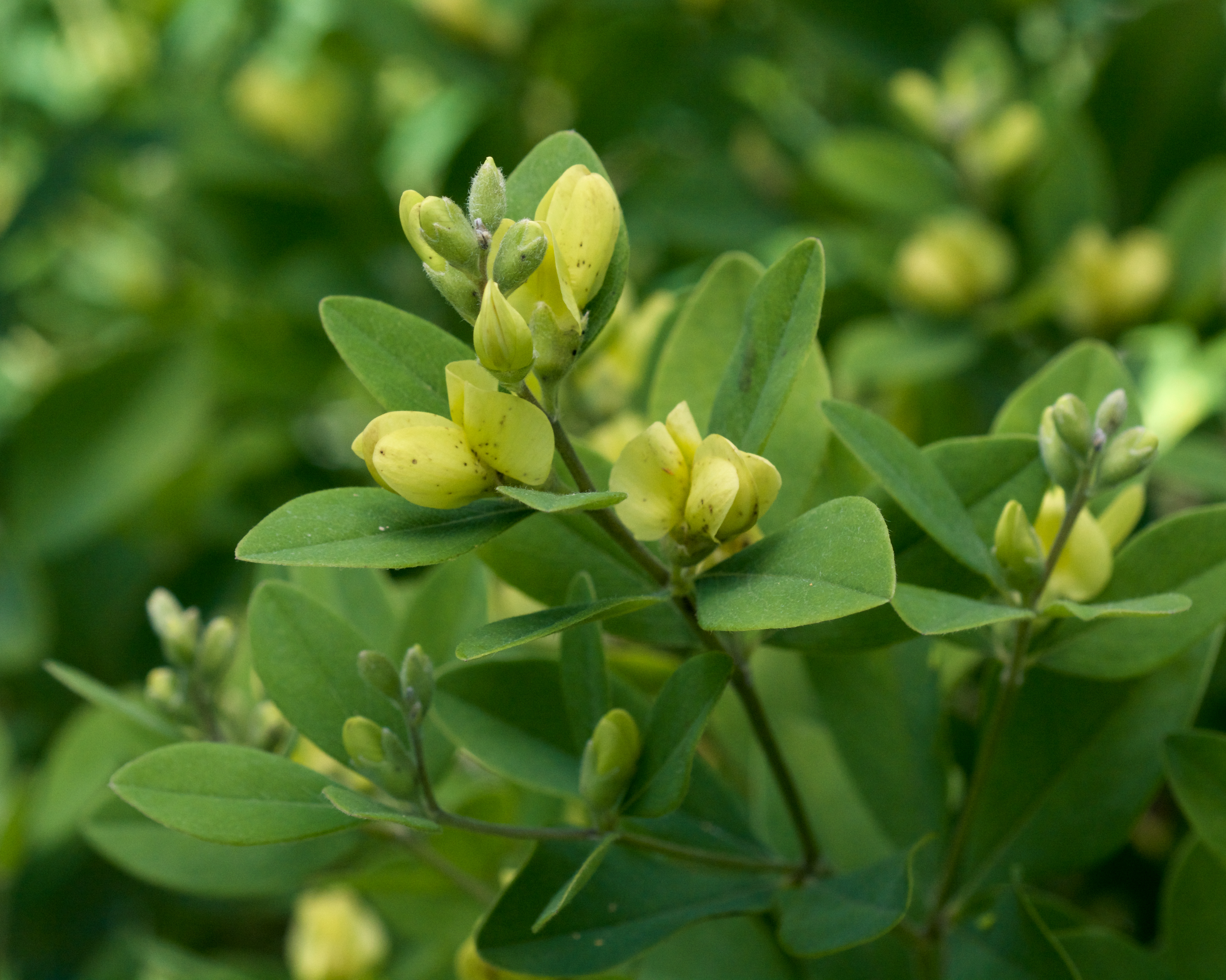

Conservation status
- Secure (NatureServe)

Scientific classification
- Kingdom: Plantae
- Clade: Tracheophytes
- Clade: Angiosperms
- Clade: Eudicots
- Clade: Rosids
- Order: Fabales
- Family: Fabaceae
- Subfamily: Faboideae
- Genus: Baptisia
- Species: B. nuttalliana

Binomial name
- Baptisia nuttalliana Small

= Baptisia nuttalliana =

Species of legume

Baptisia nuttalliana is a species of flowering plant in the legume family known by the common name Nuttall's wild indigo. It is found in the south-central United States.
