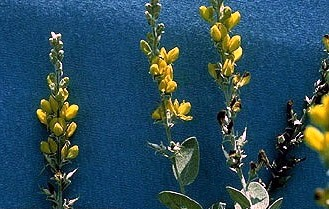

Conservation status
- Critically Imperiled (NatureServe)

Scientific classification
- Kingdom: Plantae
- Clade: Tracheophytes
- Clade: Angiosperms
- Clade: Eudicots
- Clade: Rosids
- Order: Fabales
- Family: Fabaceae
- Subfamily: Faboideae
- Genus: Baptisia
- Species: B. arachnifera

Binomial name
- Baptisia arachnifera W.H.Duncan

= Baptisia arachnifera =

Species of legume

Baptisia arachnifera, commonly known as hairy rattleweed, cobwebby wild indigo, hairy wild indigo, and hairy false indigo, is an endangered species of flowering plant in the legume family. Its native habitat is limited to sandy soils in pinewoods along the coastal plain of the U.S. state of Georgia.

== Taxonomy ==
Wilbur H. Duncan first described this species in 1944 after collecting a specimen in 1942 from a site in Wayne County, Georgia.

== Description ==
Baptisia arachnifera is a perennial that grows to a height of forty to eighty centimeters and is "covered with grayish-white, cobwebby hairs". Blue-green, simple leaves are alternate and heart-shaped. They range in size from 2–6 cm long by 1.5–5 cm wide.

Flowers form in terminal racemes with five bright yellow petals and bloom in late June through early August. Fruits are woody pods 8–15 mm long and 6–9 mm wide with stalks and beaks, forming in August through October.

== Distribution and conservation ==
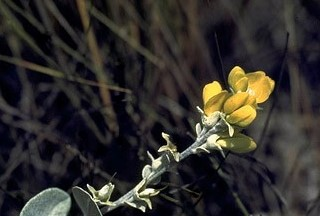

95 to 99% of the species' native habitat has been destroyed and replanted with plantations of pine trees. It now remains in patchy areas among these stands and in nearby forest and even roadsides. Fire suppression in areas of silviculture may be detrimental to the plant, but specimens growing among the pines encounter less competition with other plants and may grow bigger.

Baptisia arachnifera has been listed by the U.S. Fish and Wildlife Service as endangered since 1978. It is known from two counties, Brantley and Wayne, in the coastal plain of Georgia.

In addition to protecting its habitat from being drained or developed, prescribed burning may benefit the species. Timber company, Rayonier, received a Leadership in Conservation Award for its use of prescribed fire to help the species.
