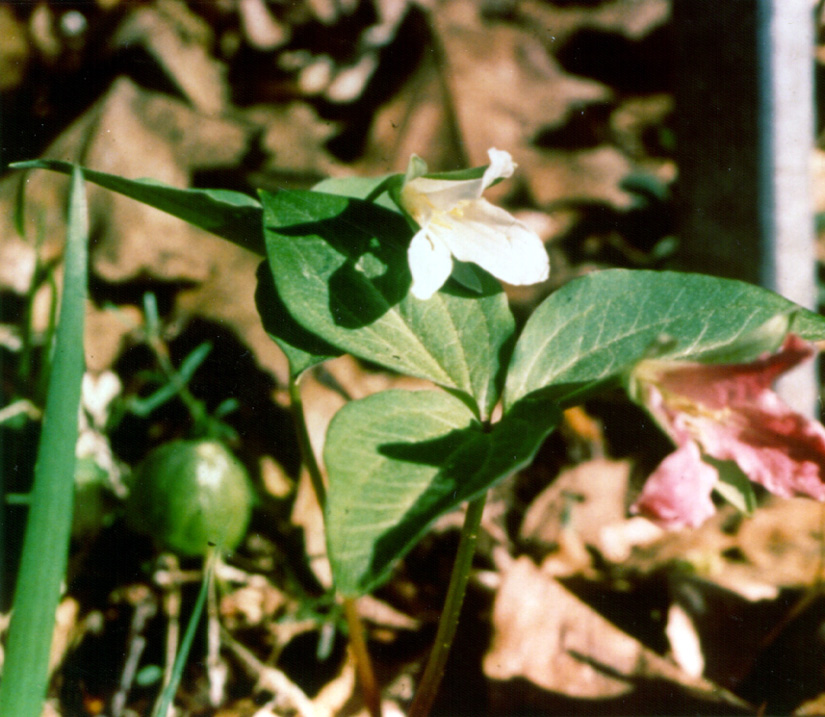

Conservation status
- Vulnerable (IUCN 3.1)

- Critically Imperiled (NatureServe)

Scientific classification
- Kingdom: Plantae
- Clade: Tracheophytes
- Clade: Angiosperms
- Clade: Monocots
- Order: Liliales
- Family: Melanthiaceae
- Genus: Trillium
- Species: T. persistens

Binomial name
- Trillium persistens Duncan, 1971

= Trillium persistens =

Persistent trillium

Species of flowering plant

Trillium persistens, the persistent trillium, is a North American species of flowering plants in the genus Trillium of family Melanthiaceae (formerly Trilliaceae). The plant is also called the persistent wakerobin.

Persistent trillium is an endangered herbaceous perennial plant that grows to a height of 20–30 cm, with three leaves in a whorl near the top of the stem just below the flower; each leaf is broad lanceolate, 3–9 cm long and 1.5–3.5 cm broad. The white flower has three petals, each petal 2–3.5 cm long and 0.5–1 cm broad.

This plant has a limited range in parts of the United States in the northeastern Georgia and northwestern South Carolina.
