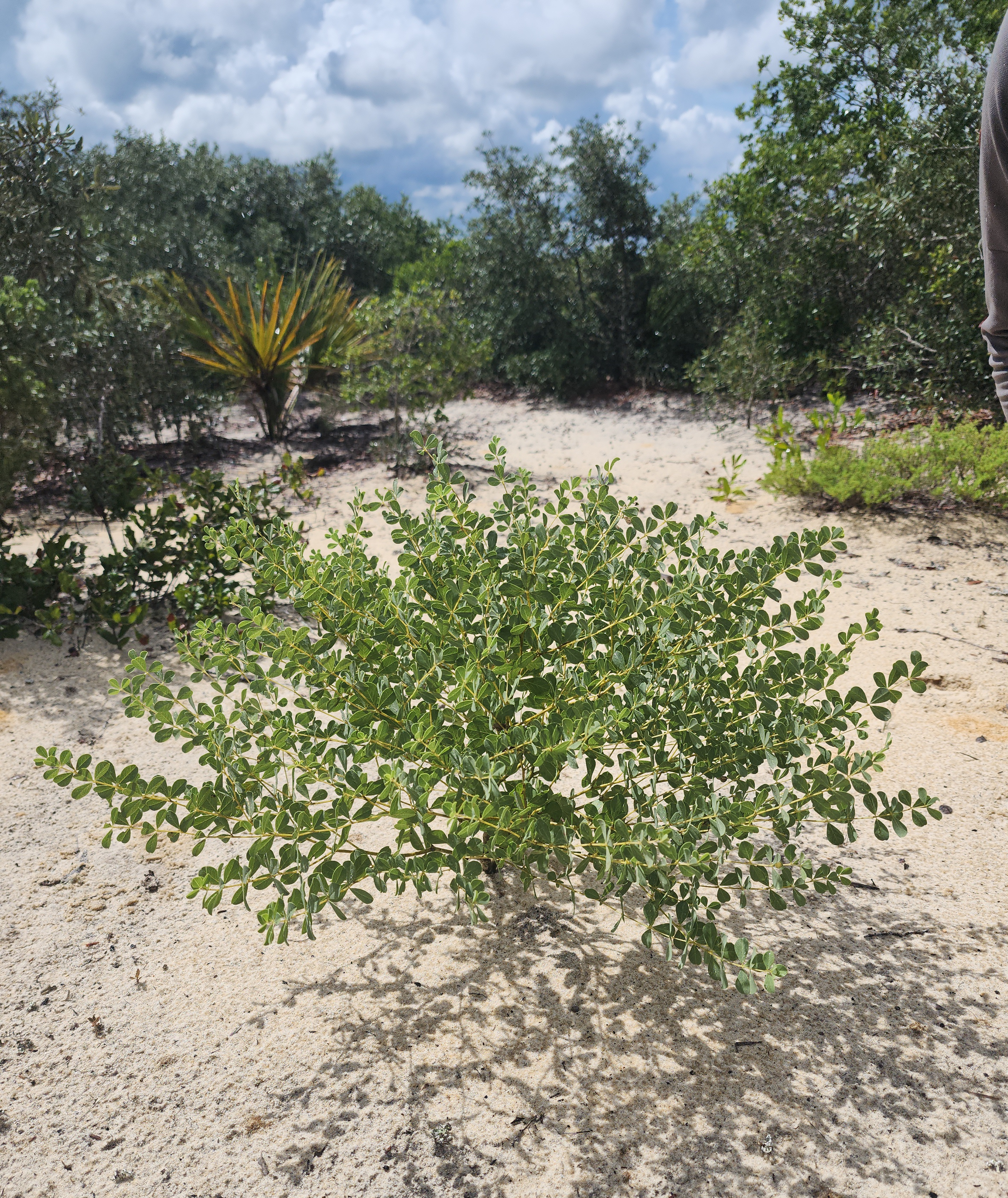

Conservation status
- Apparently Secure (NatureServe)

Scientific classification
- Kingdom: Plantae
- Clade: Tracheophytes
- Clade: Angiosperms
- Clade: Eudicots
- Clade: Rosids
- Order: Fabales
- Family: Fabaceae
- Subfamily: Faboideae
- Genus: Baptisia
- Species: B. lecontei

Binomial name
- Baptisia lecontei Torr. & A.Gray

= Baptisia lecontei =

Species of flowering plant

Baptisia lecontei, commonly referred to as pineland wild indigo or Le Conte's wild indigo, is a species of perennial flowering plant native to the U.S. southeast coastal plain in the states of Florida and Georgia.

== Habitat ==
It occurs in sandy, fire-dependent pine habitats of the southeast including longleaf pine sandhill and pine flatwoods.

== Conservation ==
The species is considered rare in Georgia. In Florida, it is considered more common, sometimes locally abundant to the point of being weedy.

== Gallery ==
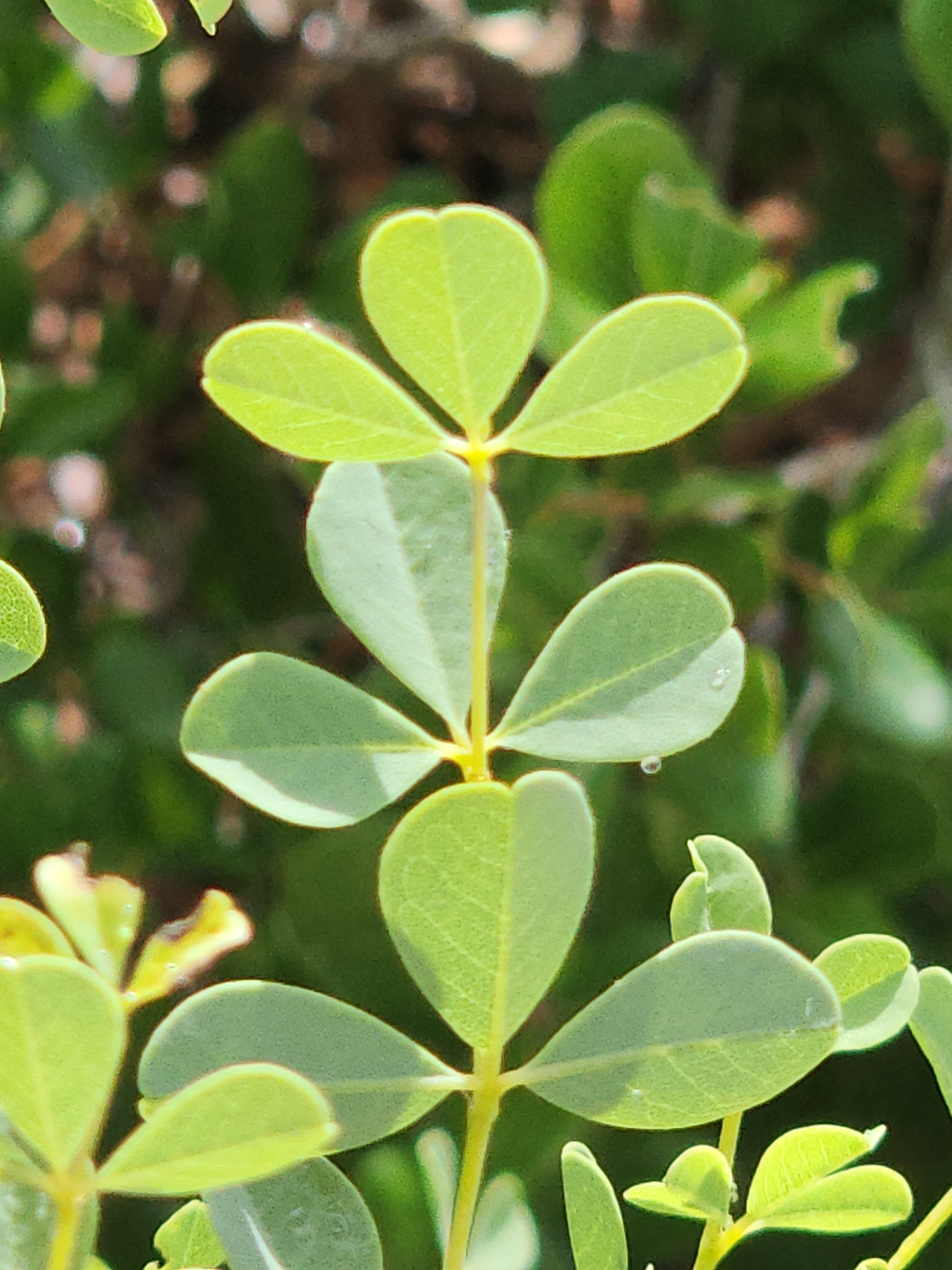
Closeup of foliage

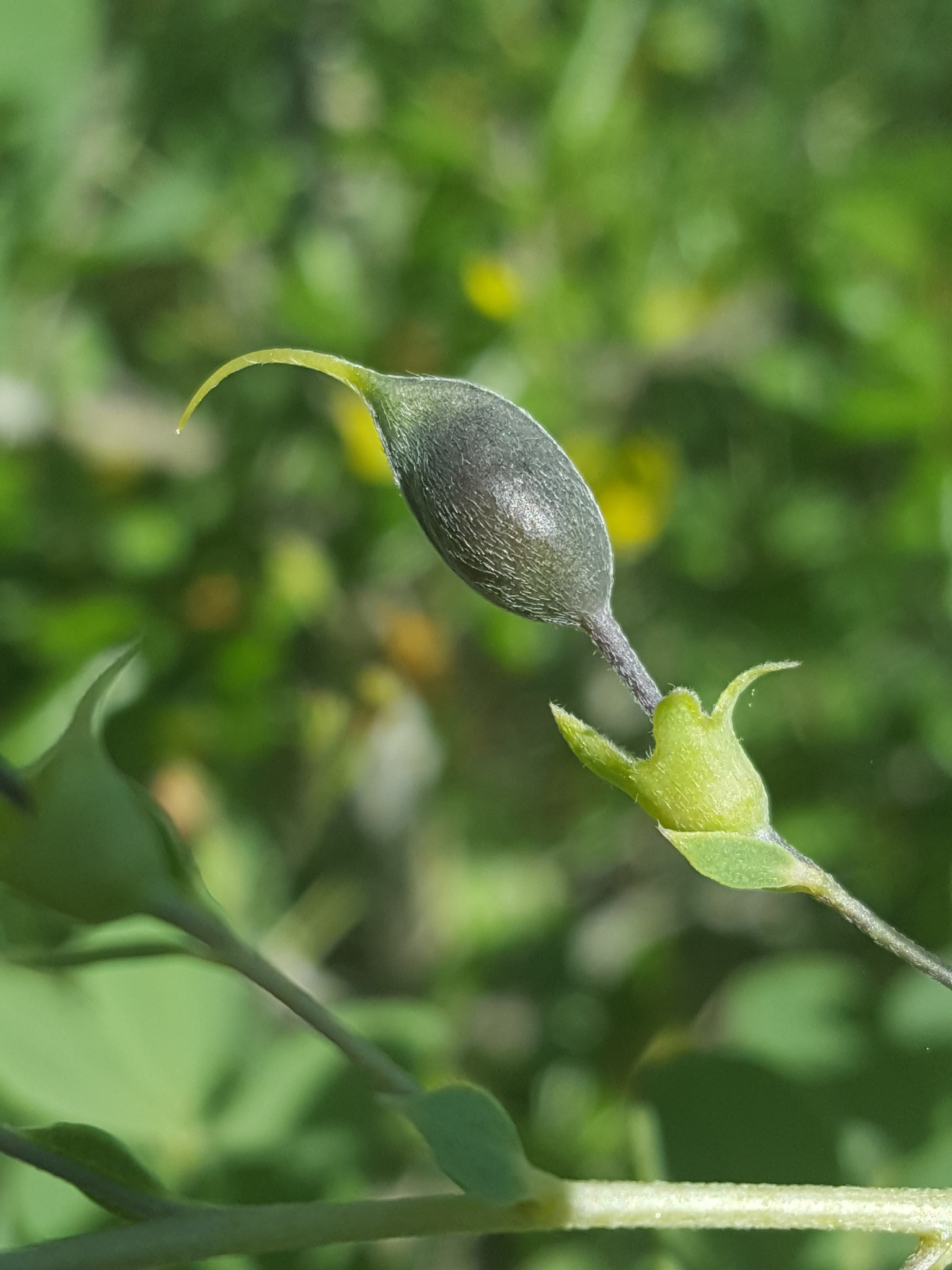
Fruit
