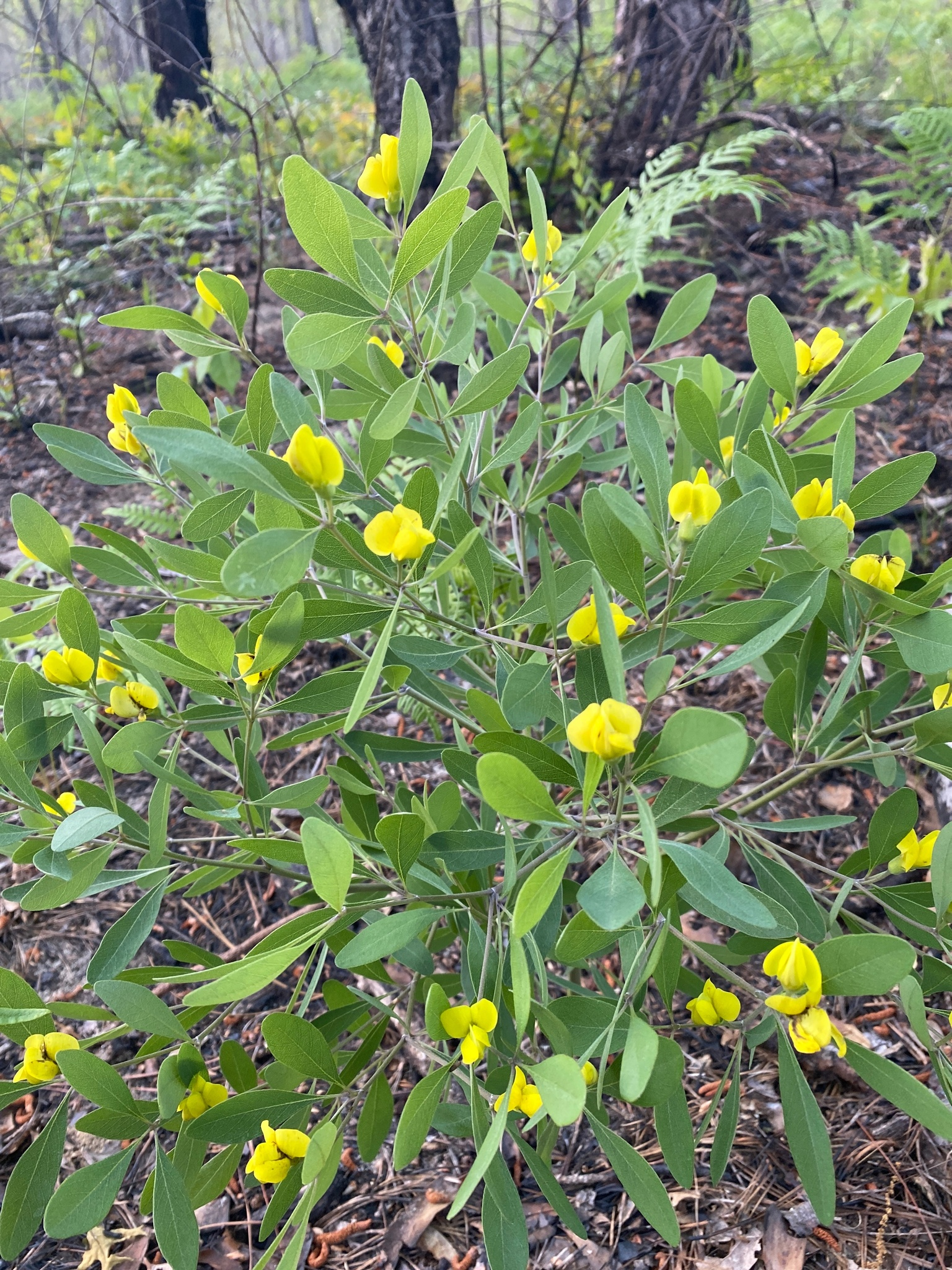
- In the George L. Smith State Park, Georgia

Scientific classification
- Kingdom: Plantae
- Clade: Tracheophytes
- Clade: Angiosperms
- Clade: Eudicots
- Clade: Rosids
- Order: Fabales
- Family: Fabaceae
- Subfamily: Faboideae
- Genus: Baptisia
- Species: B. lanceolata

Binomial name
- Baptisia lanceolata (Walter) Elliott

Synonyms
- Baptisia elliptica Small; Baptisia elliptica var. tomentosa Larisey; Baptisia lanceolata var. tomentosa (Larisey) Isely; Baptisia uniflora (Michx.) Sm.; Lasinia reticulata Raf.; Podalyria uniflora Michx.; Sophora lanceolata Walter

= Baptisia lanceolata =

Species of plant

Baptisia lanceolata, the gopherweed, is a species of flowering plant in the family Fabaceae. It is native to the US states of Alabama, Florida, Georgia, and South Carolina. A perennial reaching 3 ft (1 m), it is found in dry sandy areas such as the Carolina sand hills and open piney woodlands such as the longleaf pine ecosystem. It has bright yellow pea like flowers which attract insect pollinators and bees. The Latin specific epithet lanceolata refers to the shape of the foliage.

== Subtaxa ==
The following varieties are accepted:

- Baptisia lanceolata var. elliptica (Small) B.L.Turner – Alabama, Florida, Georgia
- Baptisia lanceolata var. lanceolata – Florida, Georgia, South Carolina
