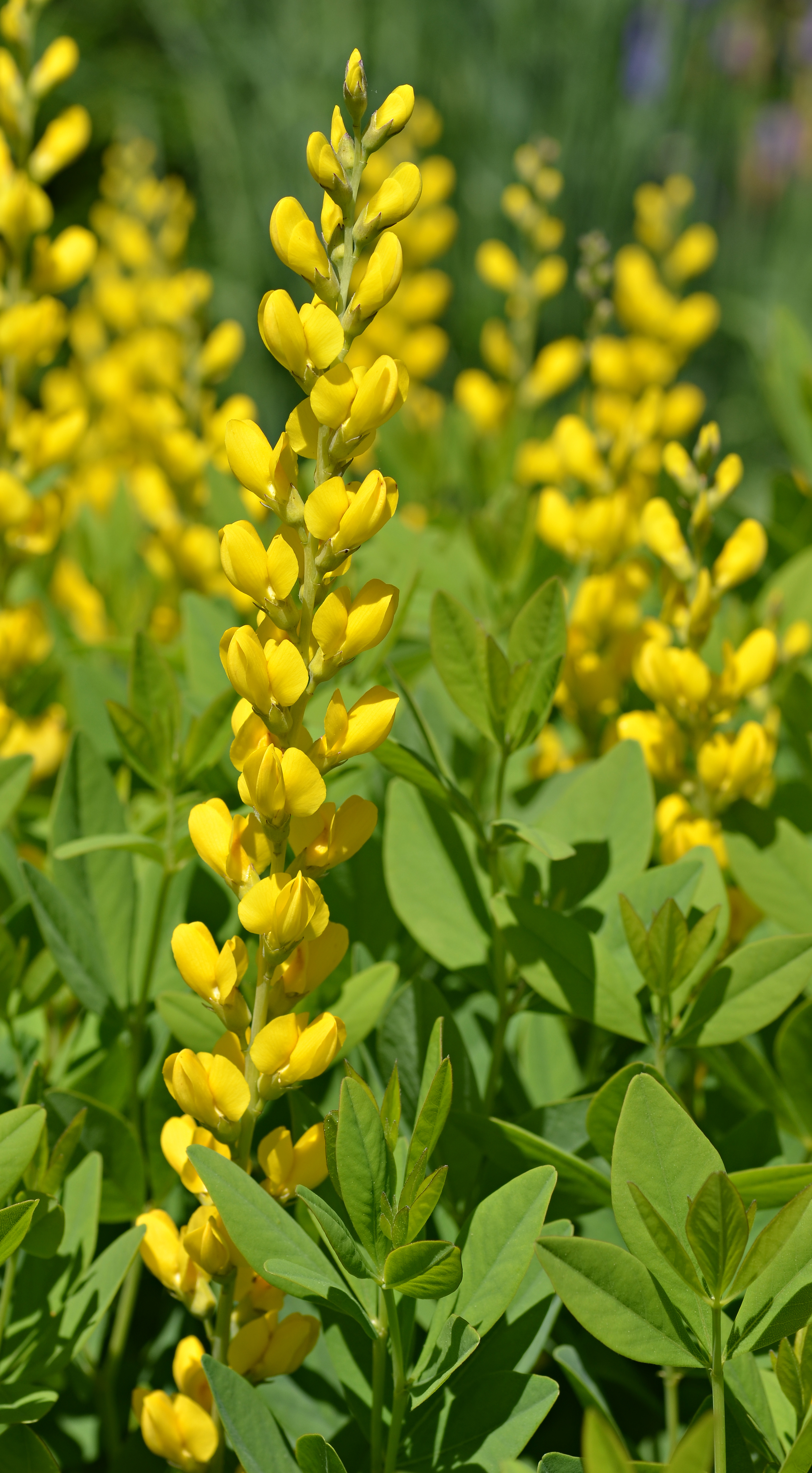

Scientific classification
- Kingdom: Plantae
- Clade: Tracheophytes
- Clade: Angiosperms
- Clade: Eudicots
- Clade: Rosids
- Order: Fabales
- Family: Fabaceae
- Subfamily: Faboideae
- Genus: Baptisia
- Species: B. sphaerocarpa

Binomial name
- Baptisia sphaerocarpa Nutt.

= Baptisia sphaerocarpa =

Species of legume

Baptisia sphaerocarpa (common names include yellow wild indigo) is a herbaceous perennial plant in the family Fabaceae. It is native to southern North America.
