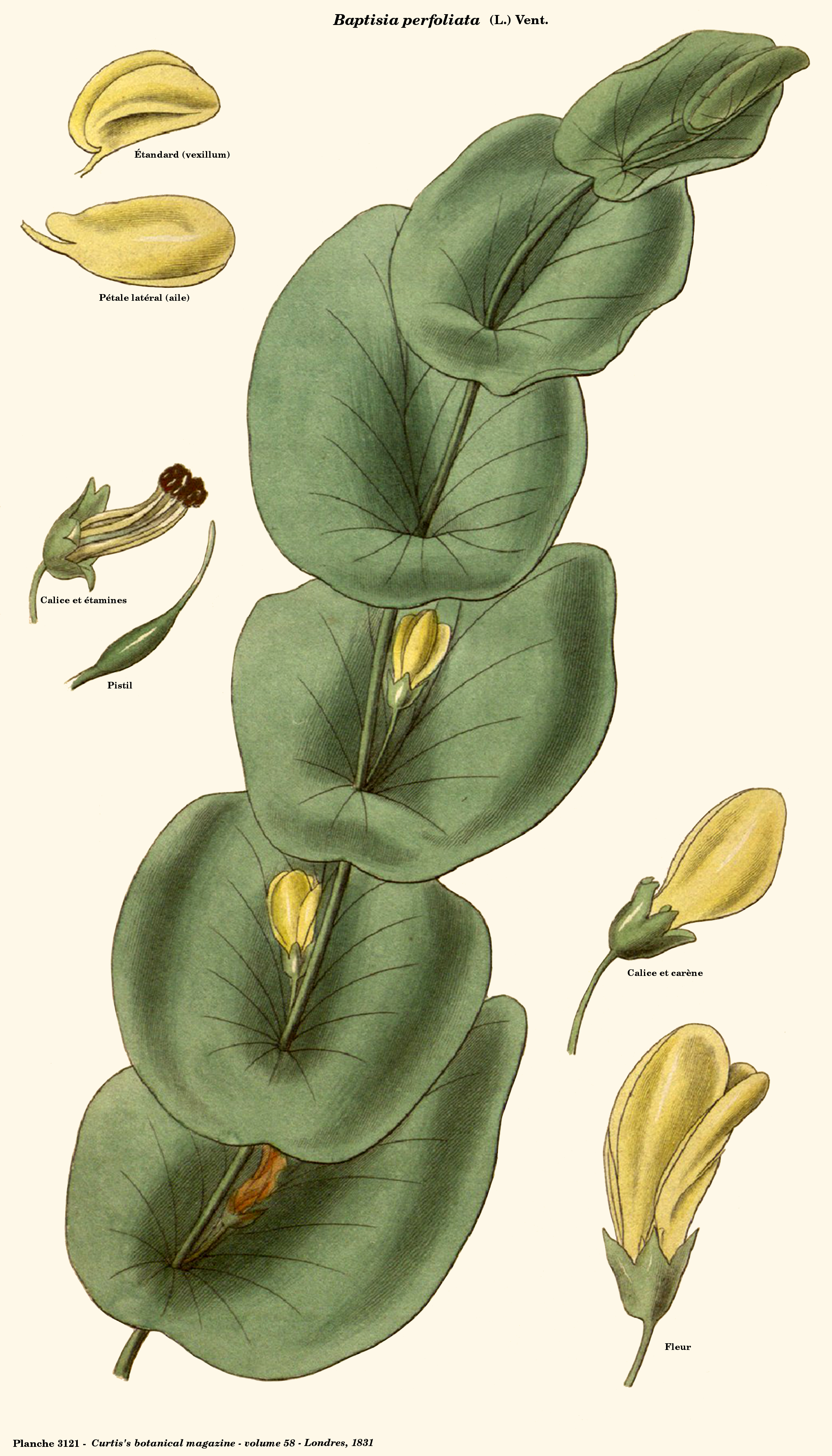
- Botanical illustration

Scientific classification
- Kingdom: Plantae
- Clade: Tracheophytes
- Clade: Angiosperms
- Clade: Eudicots
- Clade: Rosids
- Order: Fabales
- Family: Fabaceae
- Subfamily: Faboideae
- Genus: Baptisia
- Species: B. perfoliata

Binomial name
- Baptisia perfoliata (L.) R.Br.

Synonyms
- Crotalaria perfoliata L.; Pericaulon cordatum Raf.; Pericaulon perfoliatum (L.) Raf.; Podalyria perfoliata (L.) Michx.; Rafnia perfoliata (L.) Willd.; Sophora perfoliata Walter

= Baptisia perfoliata =

Species of plant

Baptisia perfoliata, the catbells, is a species of flowering plant in the family Fabaceae. It is native to the US states of Alabama, Florida, Georgia, and South Carolina. A perennial reaching 3 ft (1 m), its yellow flowers appear in July and August.
