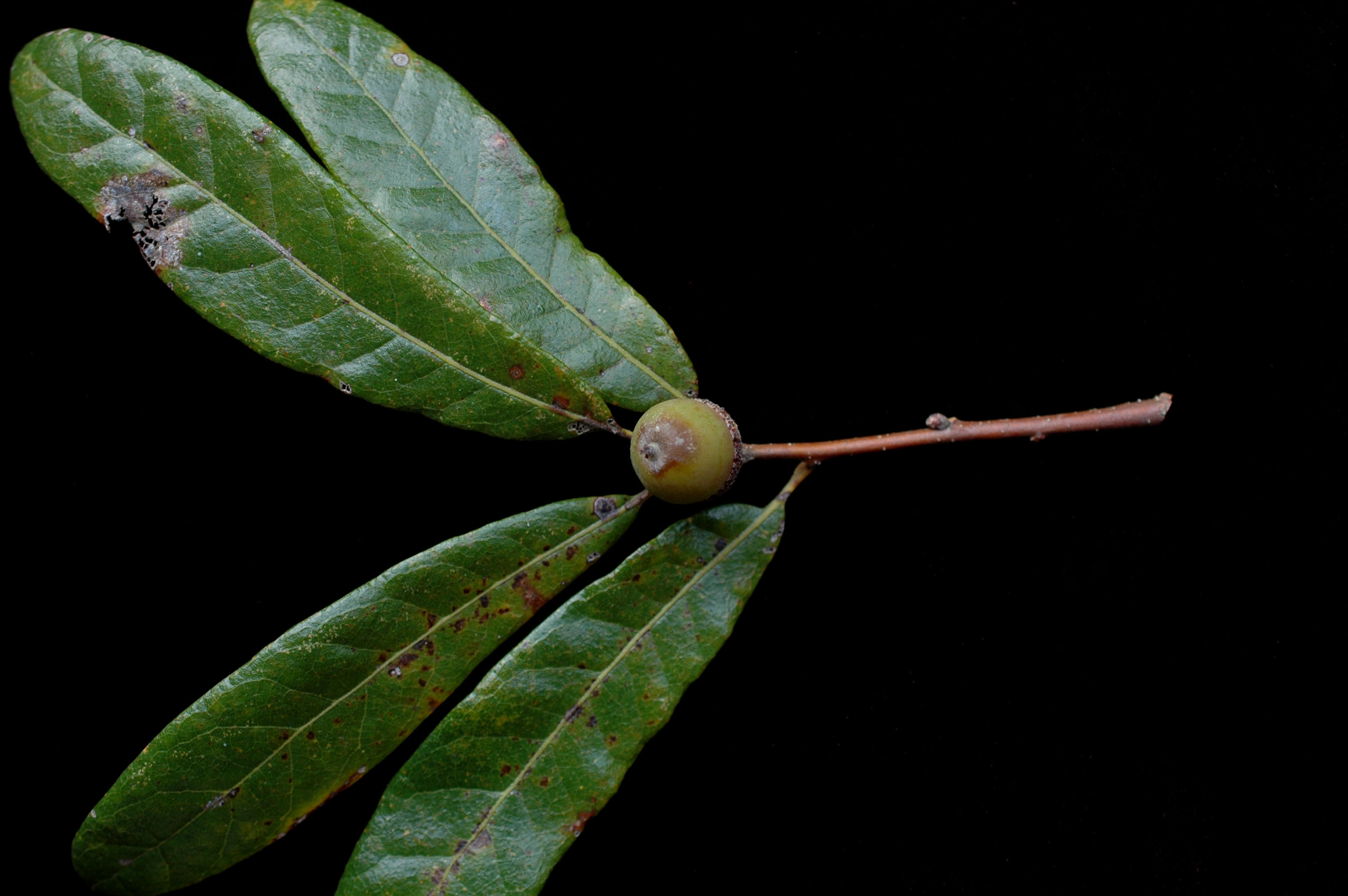

Conservation status
- Endangered (IUCN 3.1)

Scientific classification
- Kingdom: Plantae
- Clade: Tracheophytes
- Clade: Angiosperms
- Clade: Eudicots
- Clade: Rosids
- Order: Fagales
- Family: Fagaceae
- Genus: Quercus
- Subgenus: Quercus subg. Quercus
- Section: Quercus sect. Quercus
- Species: Q. oglethorpensis

Binomial name
- Quercus oglethorpensis W.H.Duncan
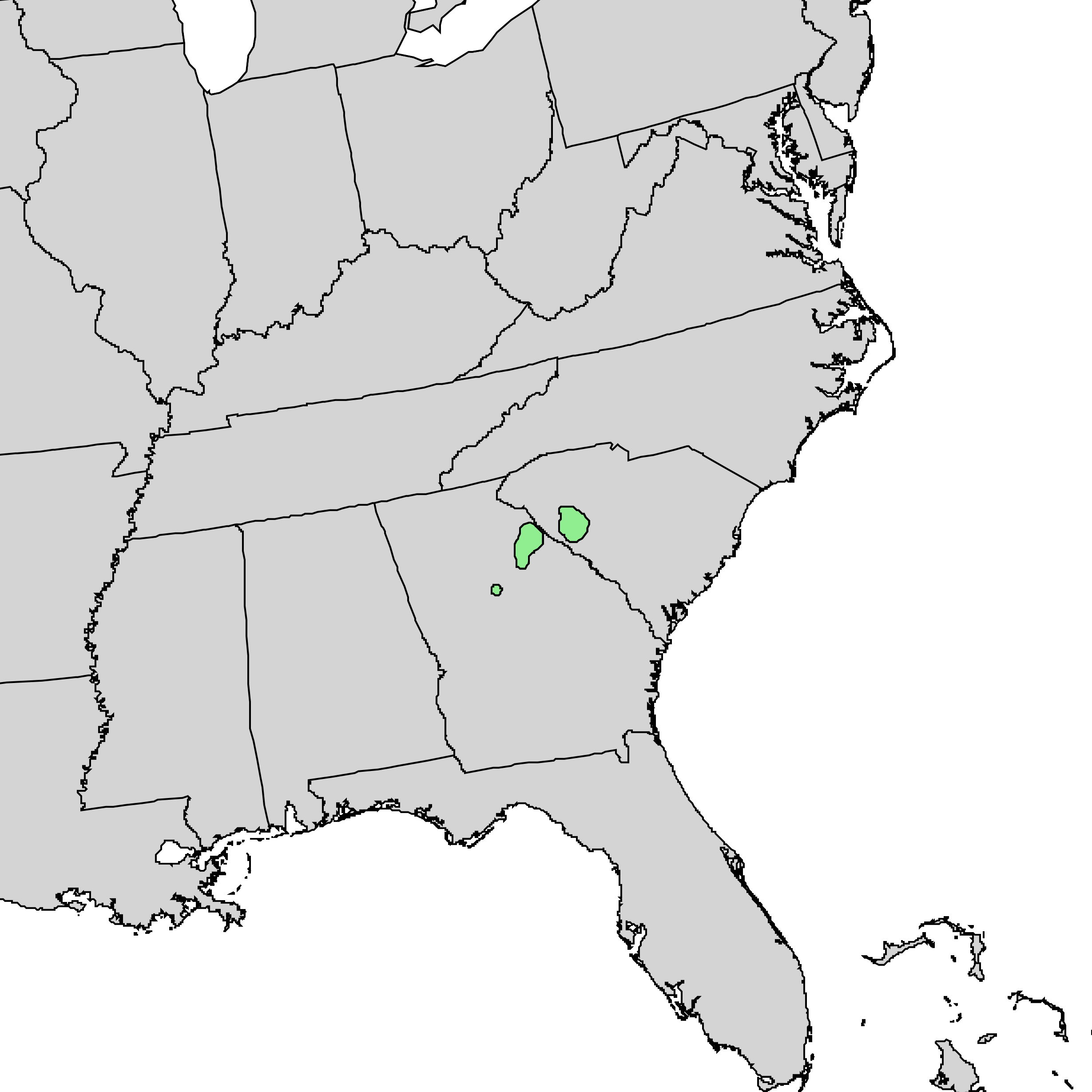
- Natural range of Quercus oglethorpensis

= Quercus oglethorpensis =

Species of oak tree

Quercus oglethorpensis (also called Oglethorpe oak) is a species of plant in the beech family. It is endemic to the United States. It is named for Oglethorpe County, Georgia, where it was first discovered. The county, in turn, is named for James Oglethorpe, the founder of Georgia Colony in the 18th century.

== Description ==
Quercus oglethorpensis is a tree growing to approximately 25 meters (83 feet) in height, with a diameter at breast height of about 80 centimetres (31 inches). The bark is white or pale gray. The leaves are narrowly elliptical, up to 15 cm (6 in) long, usually flat rather than cupped, usually with no lobes.

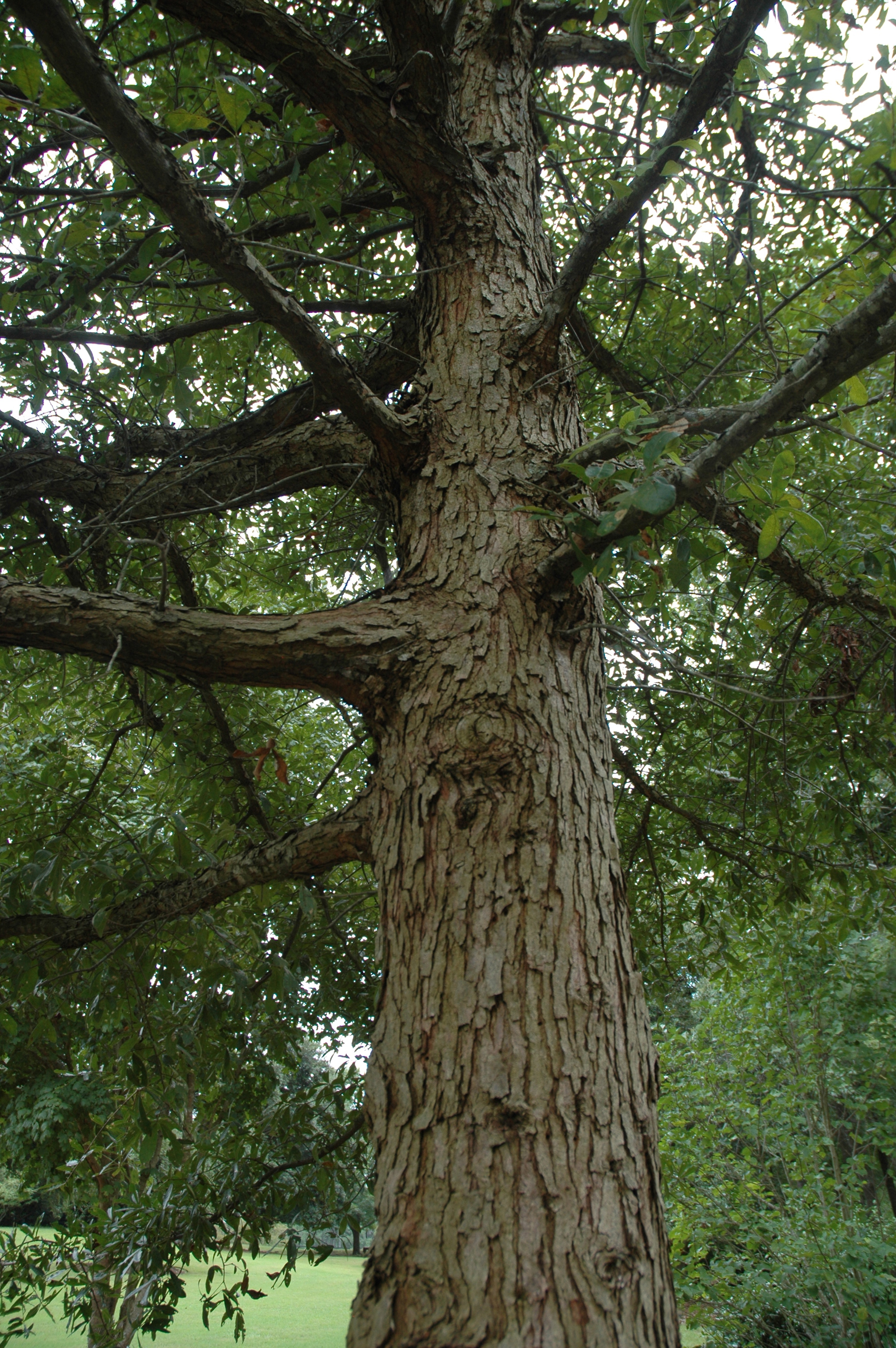
Mature tree

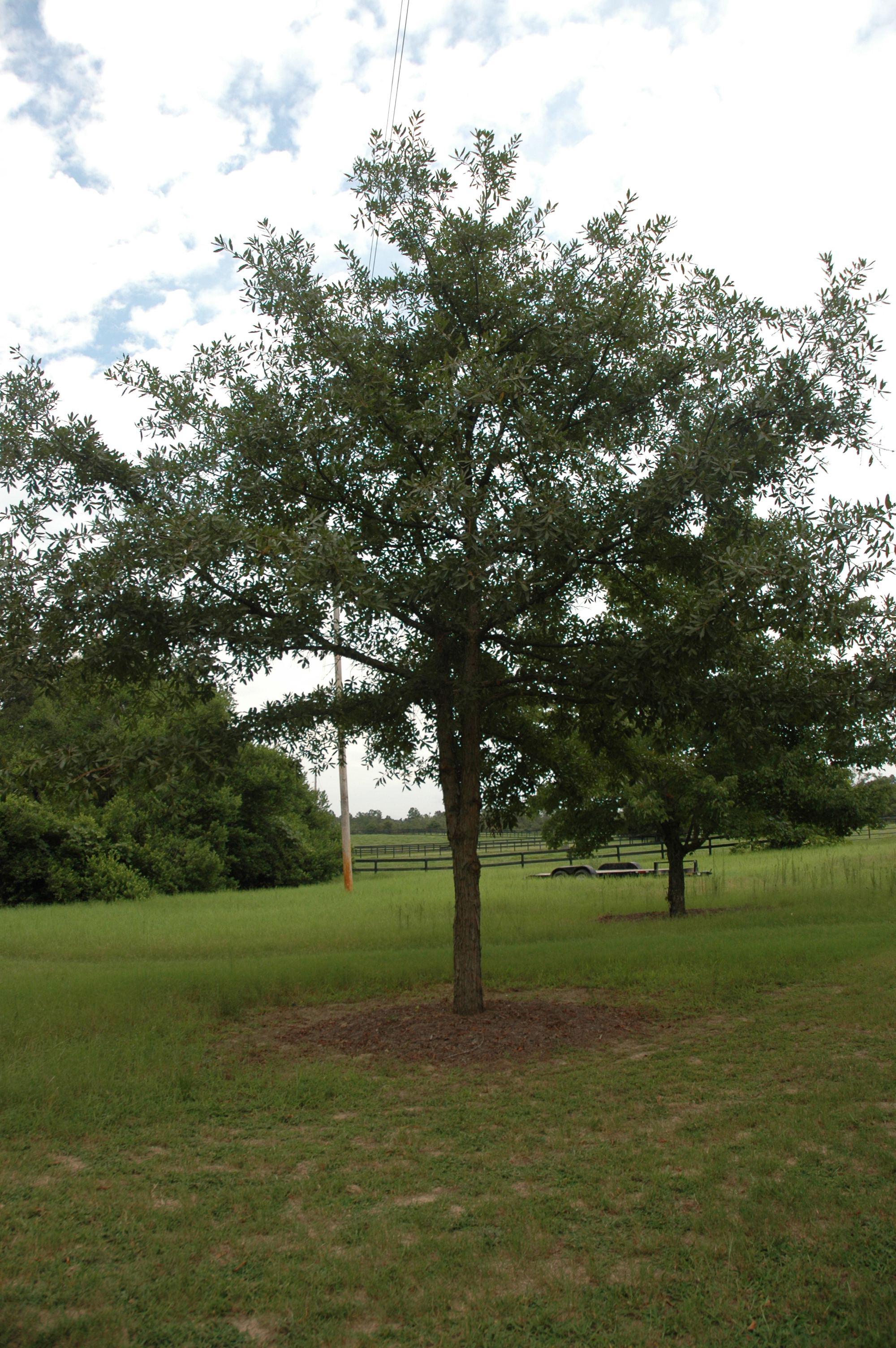
In cultivation

== Distribution ==
Quercus oglethorpensis is endemic to the southeastern United States, found only in the Piedmont of Georgia and South Carolina, and in Alabama, Louisiana and Mississippi.

== Diseases ==
This species is commonly affected by chestnut blight.
