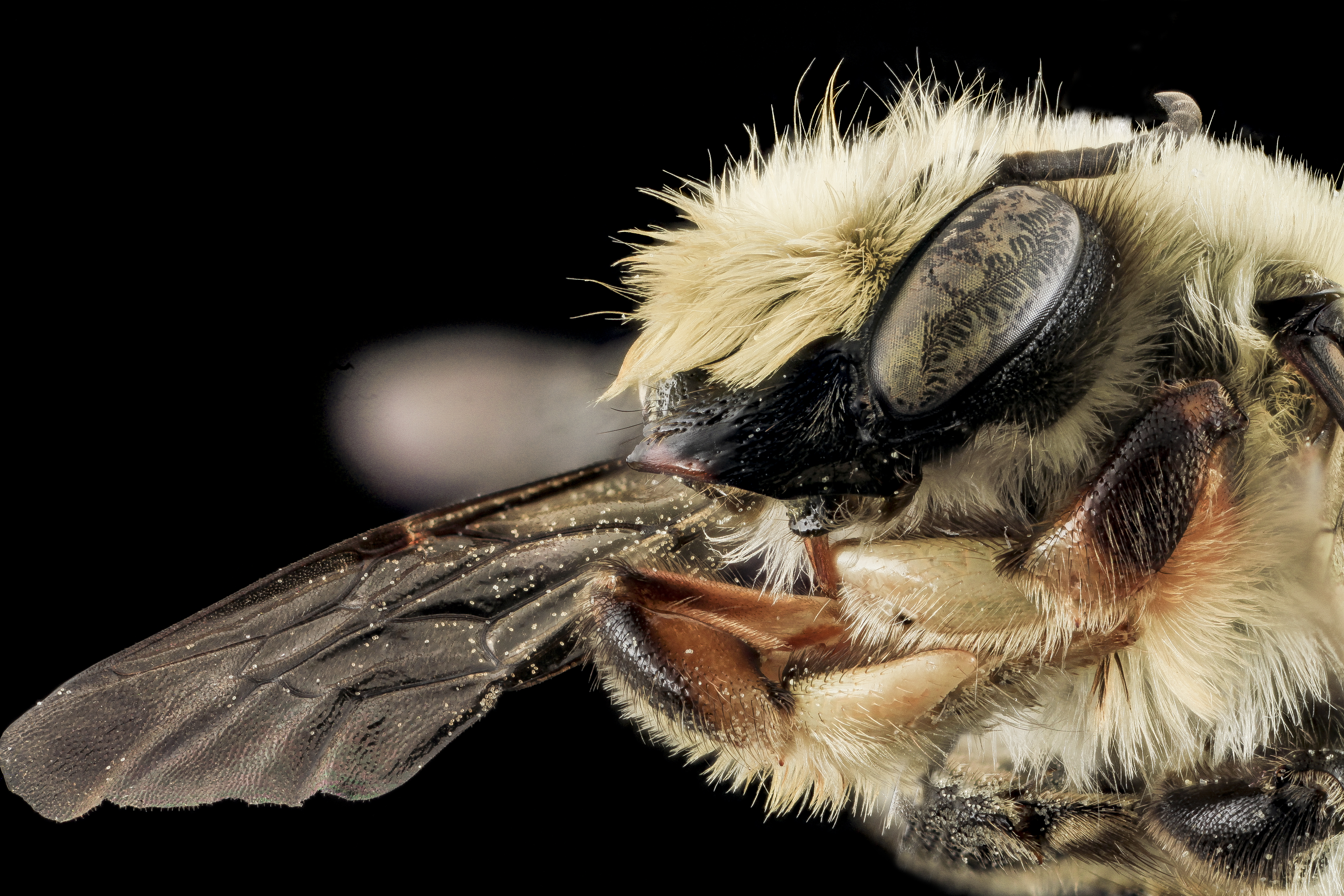
- Head of a male M. mucida

Scientific classification
- Domain: Eukaryota
- Kingdom: Animalia
- Phylum: Arthropoda
- Class: Insecta
- Order: Hymenoptera
- Family: Megachilidae
- Genus: Megachile
- Species: M. mucida

Binomial name
- Megachile mucida Cresson, 1878

= Megachile mucida =

Species of leafcutter bee (Megachile)

Megachile mucida is a species of bee in the family Megachilidae. It was described by Cresson in 1878.
