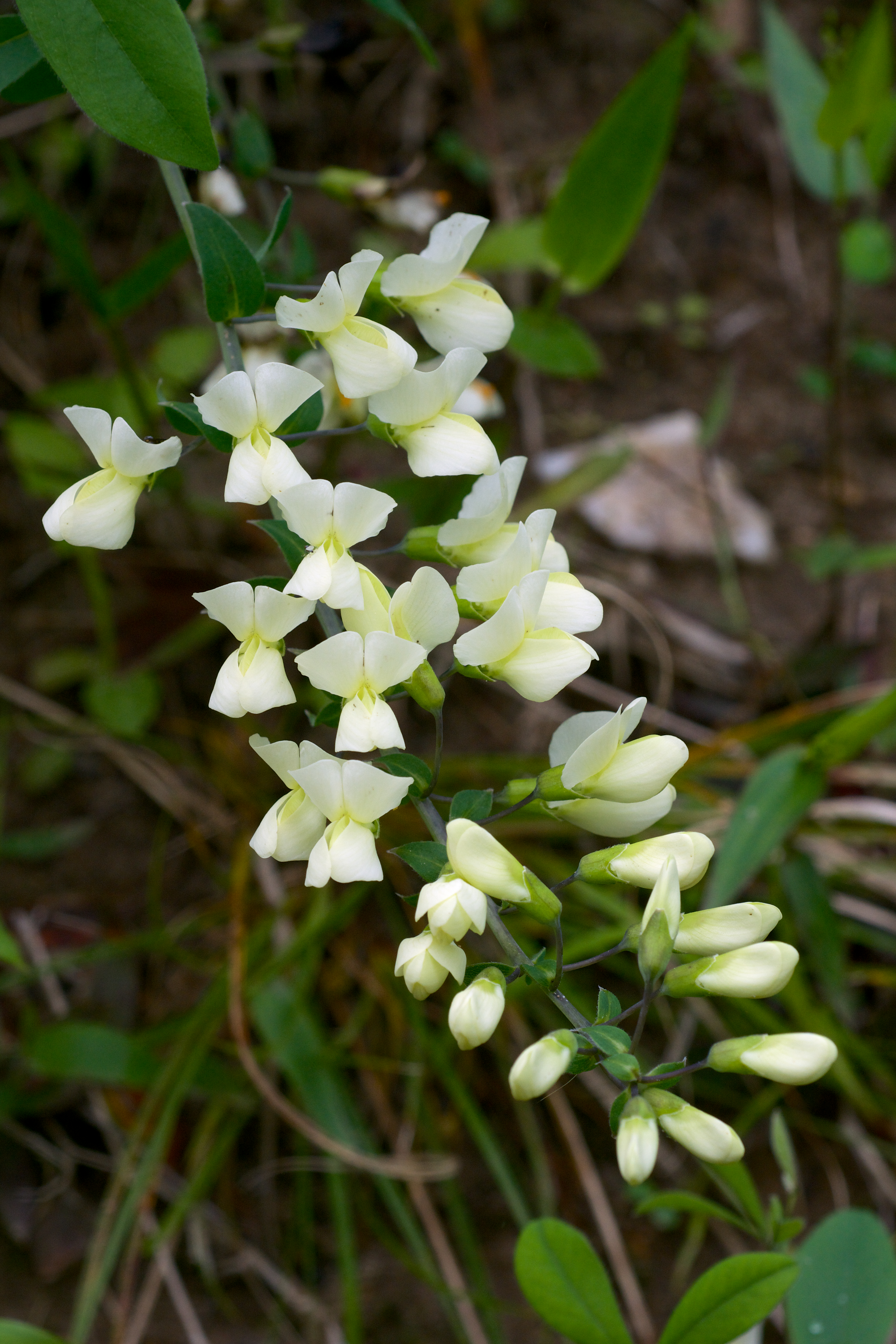

Conservation status
- Apparently Secure (NatureServe)

Scientific classification
- Kingdom: Plantae
- Clade: Tracheophytes
- Clade: Angiosperms
- Clade: Eudicots
- Clade: Rosids
- Order: Fabales
- Family: Fabaceae
- Subfamily: Faboideae
- Genus: Baptisia
- Species: B. bracteata

Binomial name
- Baptisia bracteata Elliot

= Baptisia bracteata =

Species of legume

Baptisia bracteata, otherwise known as longbract wild indigo, long-bract wild indigo, long-bracted wild indigo, plains wild indigo, cream false indigo, or cream wild indigo, is a perennial herbaceous plant in the Fabaceae (bean) family that is native to the central and eastern United States. It is one of the earliest blooming species of Baptisia, beginning to bloom in March in certain areas of the United States. The flower clusters (racemes) spread out sideways or sprawl across the ground, unlike most other Baptisia species, which have vertical racemes.

== Description ==
Baptisia bracteata grows as one or more stems from its root system, up to 46 cm (1.5 ft) tall. It is a bushy plant with stems that branch occasionally, and it can be up to 91 cm (3 ft) wide. The stems are round and light green to purple. Leaves are arranged alternately along the stem and are divided into 3 leaflets, which are 3–8 cm (1–3 in) long and 1–3 cm (0.5–1 in) across. They have smooth margins and are usually oblanceolate in shape.

The inflorescence is a long raceme, 10–30 cm (4–12 in) long, drooping below the foliage due to its weight. Each raceme has few to many pea-type flowers and leaflike, lanceolate bracts, 10–30 cm (4–12 in) long. The bloom color ranges from white to creamy yellow. After blooming, oval to cylindrical seed pods that are 3–5 cm (1–2 in) are formed.

Extrafloral nectaries have been found on the plant.

== Etymology ==
The genus name Baptisia comes from the Greek word meaning "to dye". The specific epithet bracteata is from a Latin word meaning "having bracts".

== Distribution and habitat ==
B. bracteata is native in the United States from Minnesota to the north, Texas to the west and south, and North Carolina to the east. It can be found in prairies, rocky woods, fields, and along streams.

== Ecology ==
The flowers bloom April to June and are pollinated by bumblebees, which are active making their nests at this time. The caterpillars of several skippers eat the leaves, including the wild indigo duskywing and hoary edge. The plant is poisonous to mammalian herbivores.
