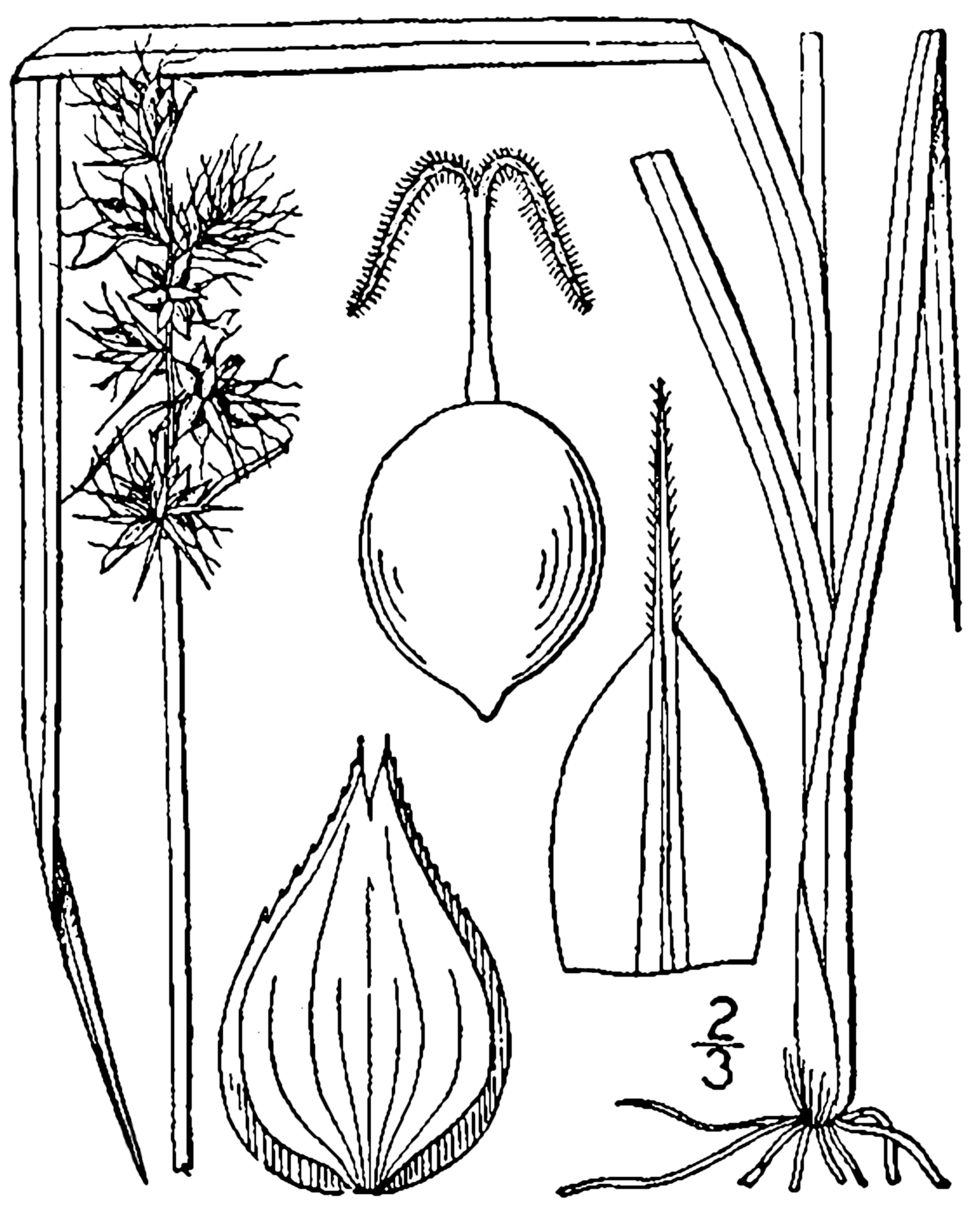

Scientific classification
- Kingdom: Plantae
- Clade: Tracheophytes
- Clade: Angiosperms
- Clade: Monocots
- Clade: Commelinids
- Order: Poales
- Family: Cyperaceae
- Genus: Carex
- Species: C. muehlenbergii

Binomial name
- Carex muehlenbergii Willd.

Synonyms
- List: Carex muehlenbergii var. muehlenbergii; Carex pinetorum Willd. ex Kunth; Carex piniaria Bosc ex Boott; Vignea muhlenbergii (Willd.) Raf.

= Carex muehlenbergii =

Species of grass-like plant

Carex muehlenbergii is a species of flowering plant, it is a type of sedge. It is a grass-like plant in the family Cyperaceae. Its common names include sand sedge, Muhlenberg's sedge.

== Description ==
Carex muehlenbergii is a perennial monocot growing 20–90 cm tall. Plants form tufts of foliage arising from a short, dark, woody rhizome. The Inflorescences have 3–10 flower spikes, is green or yellow or brown in color.

== Distribution and habitat ==
Carex muehlenbergii lives in dry sandy fields, on dunes, banks, and at the edges of oak and aspen forests. It is also found in dry woods and on sand prairies.

It is listed as a threatened species in the US states of Maine and Vermont.

There are two varieties in North America:

- Carex muehlenbergii var. enervis Boott
  - Which is different than the other variety by having smaller carpellate scales and smaller perigynia, it also lacks veins on the adaxial side of the perigynium.
- Carex muehlenbergii var. muehlenbergii
