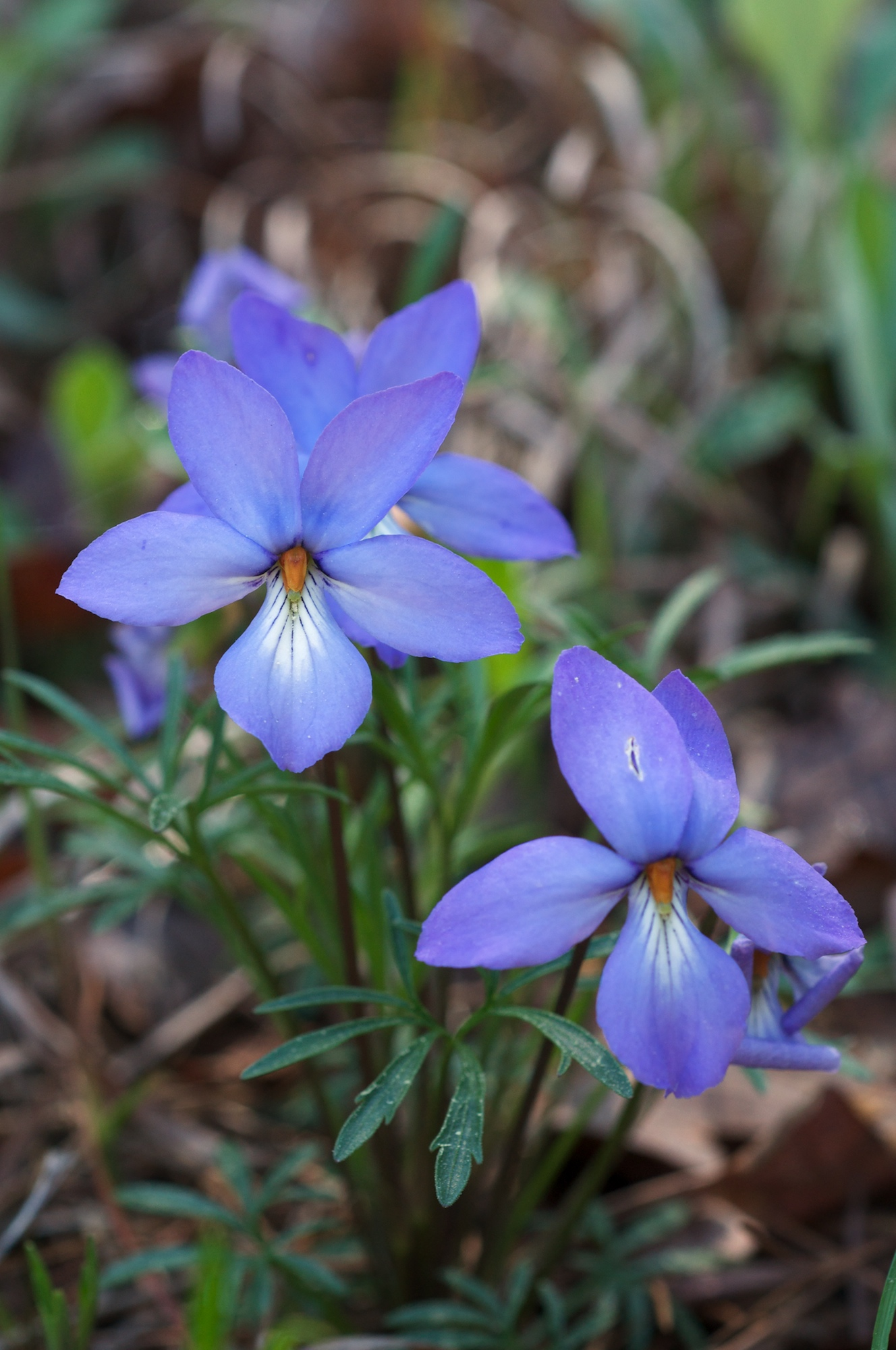
- Photographed in Hobbs State Park / Conservation Management Area, northwestern Arkansas

Conservation status
- Secure (NatureServe)

Scientific classification
- Kingdom: Plantae
- Clade: Tracheophytes
- Clade: Angiosperms
- Clade: Eudicots
- Clade: Rosids
- Order: Malpighiales
- Family: Violaceae
- Genus: Viola
- Species: V. pedata

Binomial name
- Viola pedata L.

= Viola pedata =

Species of flowering plant

Viola pedata, the birdsfoot violet, bird's-foot violet, or mountain pansy, is a violet native to sandy areas in central and eastern North America.

== Varieties ==
Two primary color forms exist, Viola pedata var. lineariloba ("concolor"), which is a solid pink-lilac-lavender color, and var. pedata ("bicolor"), in which the superior petals are a deep red-purple and the lateral and interior petals are similar to the concolor variety. Less common is Viola pedata var. linearloba forma alba, which is a white flowered form.

== Cultivation ==
Birdsfoot violet favors well drained, acidic soils in full to partial sun environments. It is difficult to cultivate in typical garden environments because it does not tolerate rich, organic garden soils and excess moisture.

== Gallery ==
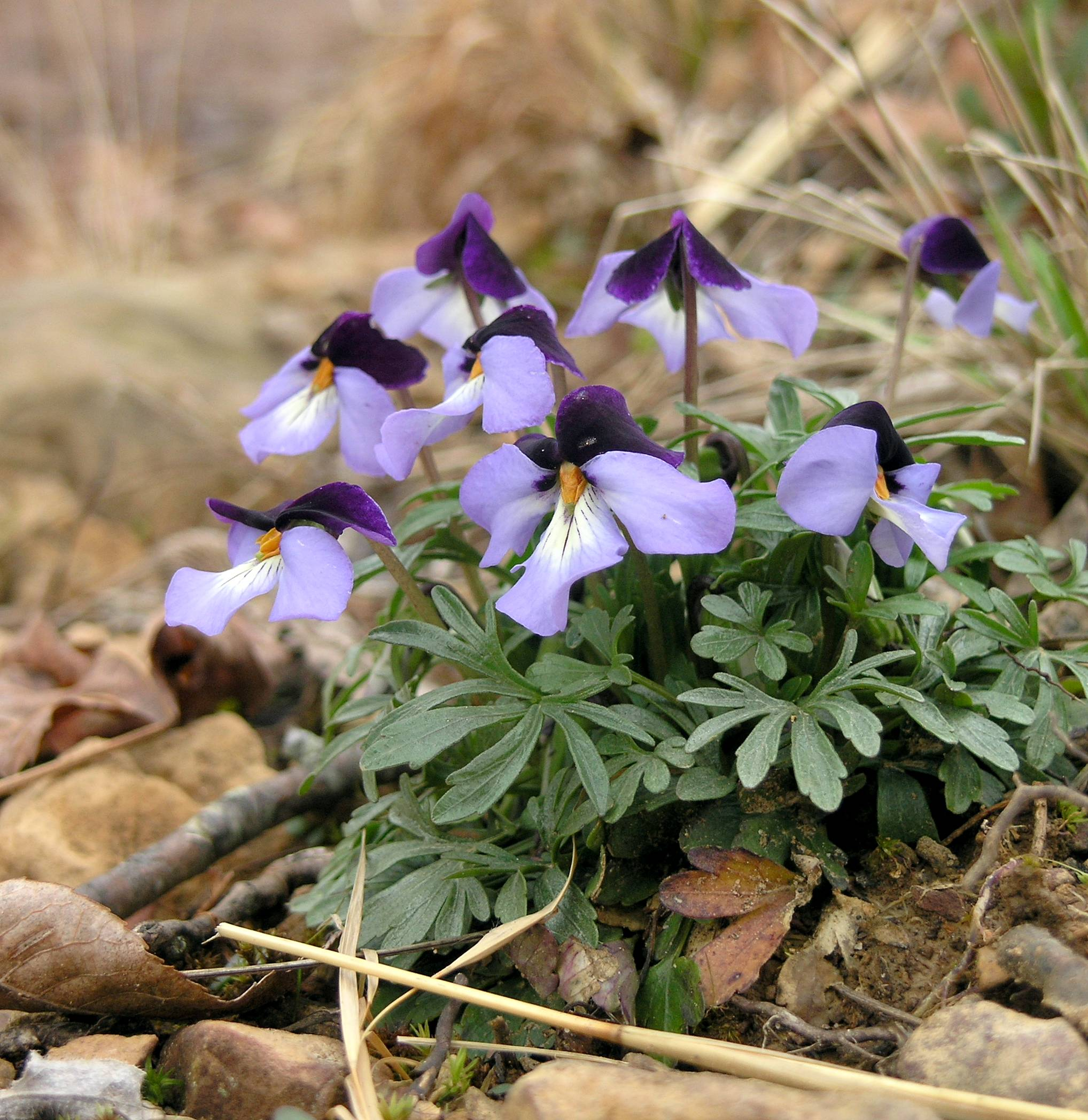
Viola pedata var. bicolor

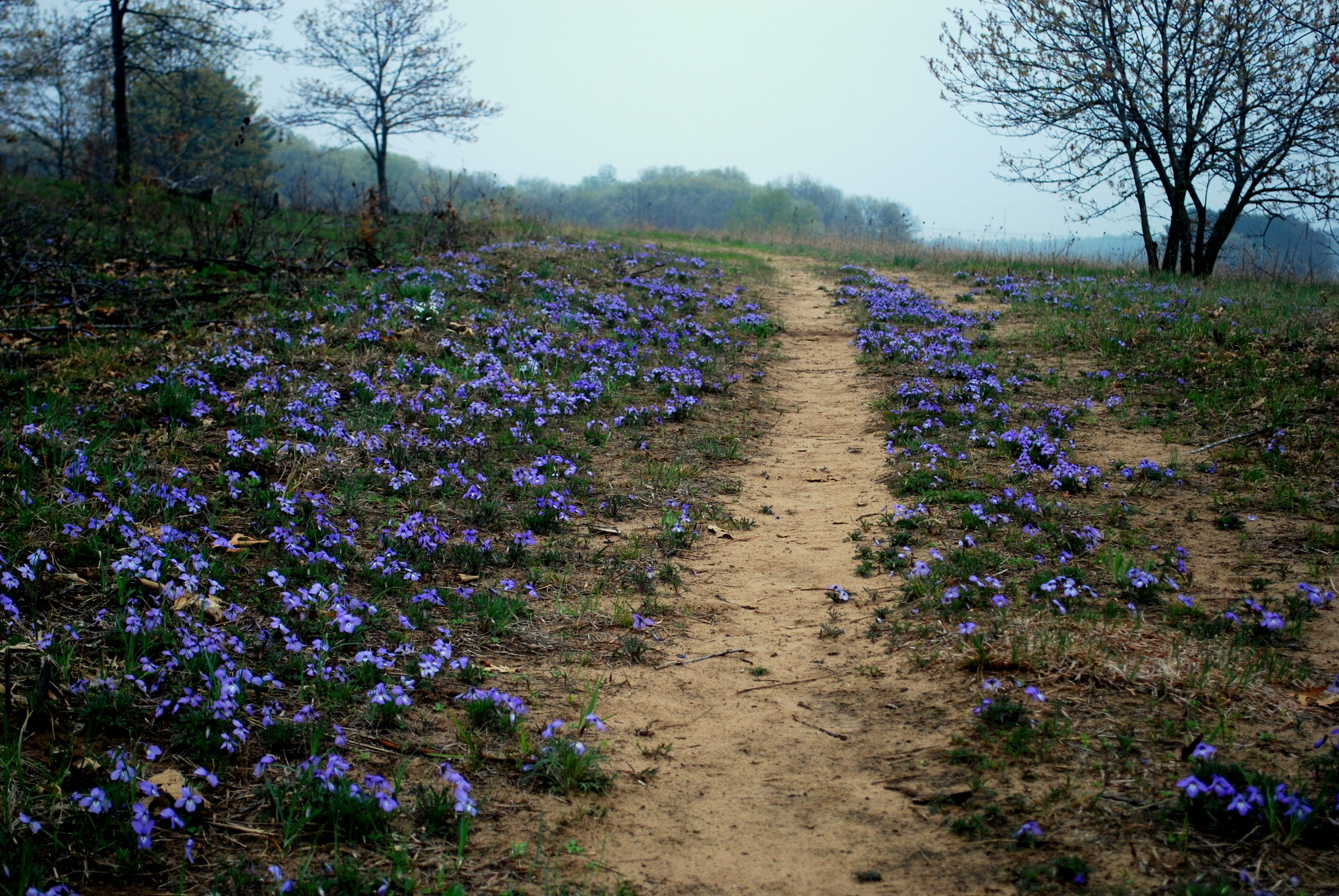
A path covered in bird's-foot violets in the Spring Green Preserve in Sauk County, Wisconsin
