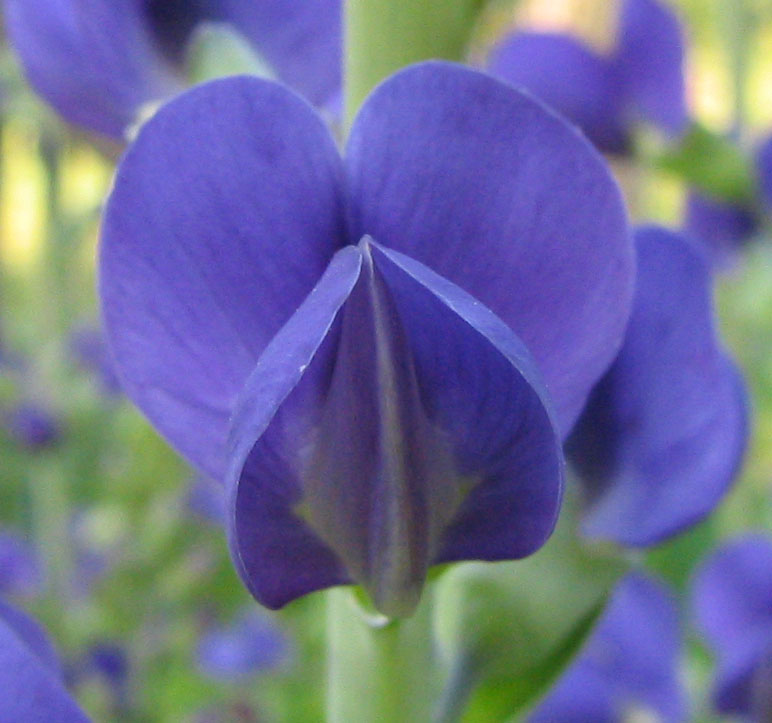
- Baptisia australis

Scientific classification
- Kingdom: Plantae
- Clade: Tracheophytes
- Clade: Angiosperms
- Clade: Eudicots
- Clade: Rosids
- Order: Fabales
- Family: Fabaceae
- Subfamily: Faboideae
- Tribe: Sophoreae
- Genus: Baptisia; Vent. (1808)

Species
- 27–30; see text

Synonyms
- Eaplosia Raf. (1837); Lasinia Raf. (1837); Pericaulon Raf. (1837); Podalyria Lam. (1793), nom. rej.; Ripasia Raf. (1837)

= Baptisia =

Genus of legumes

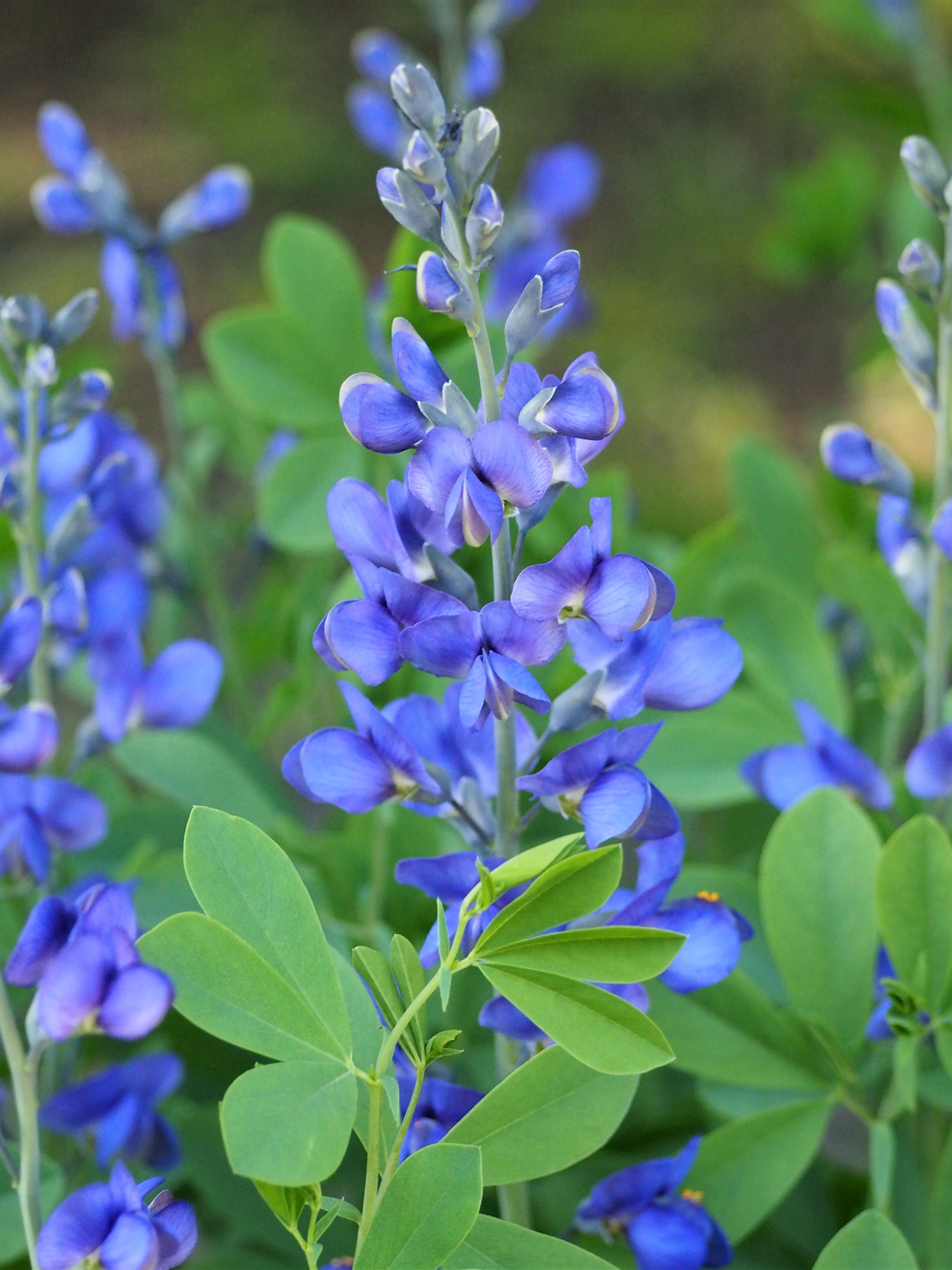
Flower stalk of Baptisia australis

Baptisia (wild indigo, false indigo) is a genus in the legume family, Fabaceae. They are flowering herbaceous perennial plants with pea-like flowers, followed by pods, which are sometimes inflated. They are native to woodland and grassland in eastern and southern North America. The species most commonly found in cultivation is B. australis.

Baptisia species are used as food plants by the larvae of some Lepidoptera species, including the jaguar flower moth, Schinia jaguarina.

== Species ==
Baptisia comprises the following species:

- Baptisia alba (L.) Vent.—white wild indigo
  - var. alba (L.) Vent.
  - var. macrophylla (Larisey) Isely
- Baptisia albescens Small
- Baptisia arachnifera W.H. Duncan—cobwebby wild indigo, hairy rattleweed (limited to two counties in southeastern Georgia)
- Baptisia australis (L.) R. Br.—blue false indigo, blue wild indigo
  - var. australis (L.) R. Br.
  - var. minor (Lehm.) Fernald
- Baptisia bicolor Greenm. & Larisey
- Baptisia bracteata Elliott—longbract wild indigo, Plains wild indigo
  - var. bracteata Elliott
  - var. glabrescens (Larisey) Isely
  - var. laevicaulis (Canby) Isely
  - var. leucophaea (Nutt.) Kartesz & Gandhi
- Baptisia calycosa Canby—Florida wild indigo
  - var. calycosa Canby
  - var. villosa Canby
- Baptisia cinerea (Raf.) Fernald & B.G. Schub.—grayhairy wild indigo
- Baptisia deamii Larisey
- Baptisia fragilis Larisey
- Baptisia fulva Larisey
- Baptisia intercalata Larisey
- Baptisia intermedia Larisey
- Baptisia lanceolata (Walter) Elliott—gopherweed (Georgia, Alabama, Florida, South Carolina)
  - var. lanceolata (Walter) Elliott
  - var. tomentosa (Larisey) Isely
- Baptisia lecontei Torr. & A. Gray—pineland wild indigo
- Baptisia macilenta Small ex Larisey
- Baptisia megacarpa Torr. & A. Gray—Apalachicola wild indigo
- Baptisia microphylla Nutt.
- Baptisia nuttalliana Small—Nuttall's wild indigo
- Baptisia perfoliata (L.) R. Br.—catbells
- Baptisia pinetorum Larisey
- Baptisia serenae M.A. Curtis
- Baptisia simplicifolia Croom—scareweed
- Baptisia sphaerocarpa Nutt.—yellow wild indigo, green wild indigo, round wild indigo
- Baptisia stricta Larisey
- Baptisia sulphurea Engelm.
- Baptisia tinctoria (L.) Vent.—rattleweed, wild indigo, horseflyweed, indigo-broom, yellow broom

== Species names with uncertain taxonomic status ==
The status of the following species is unresolved:

- Baptisia auriculata Sweet
- Baptisia lupinoides Burb.
- Baptisia retusa Raf.

== Hybrids ==
The following hybrids have been described:

- Baptisia x bicolor
- Baptisia × bushii Small
- Baptisia x deamii
- Baptisia x microphylla
- Baptisia x serenae
- Baptisia x sulphurae
- Baptisia ×variicolor Kosnik, et al. (Baptisia australis × Baptisia sphaerocarpa)

== See also ==
- Indigofera—true indigo
