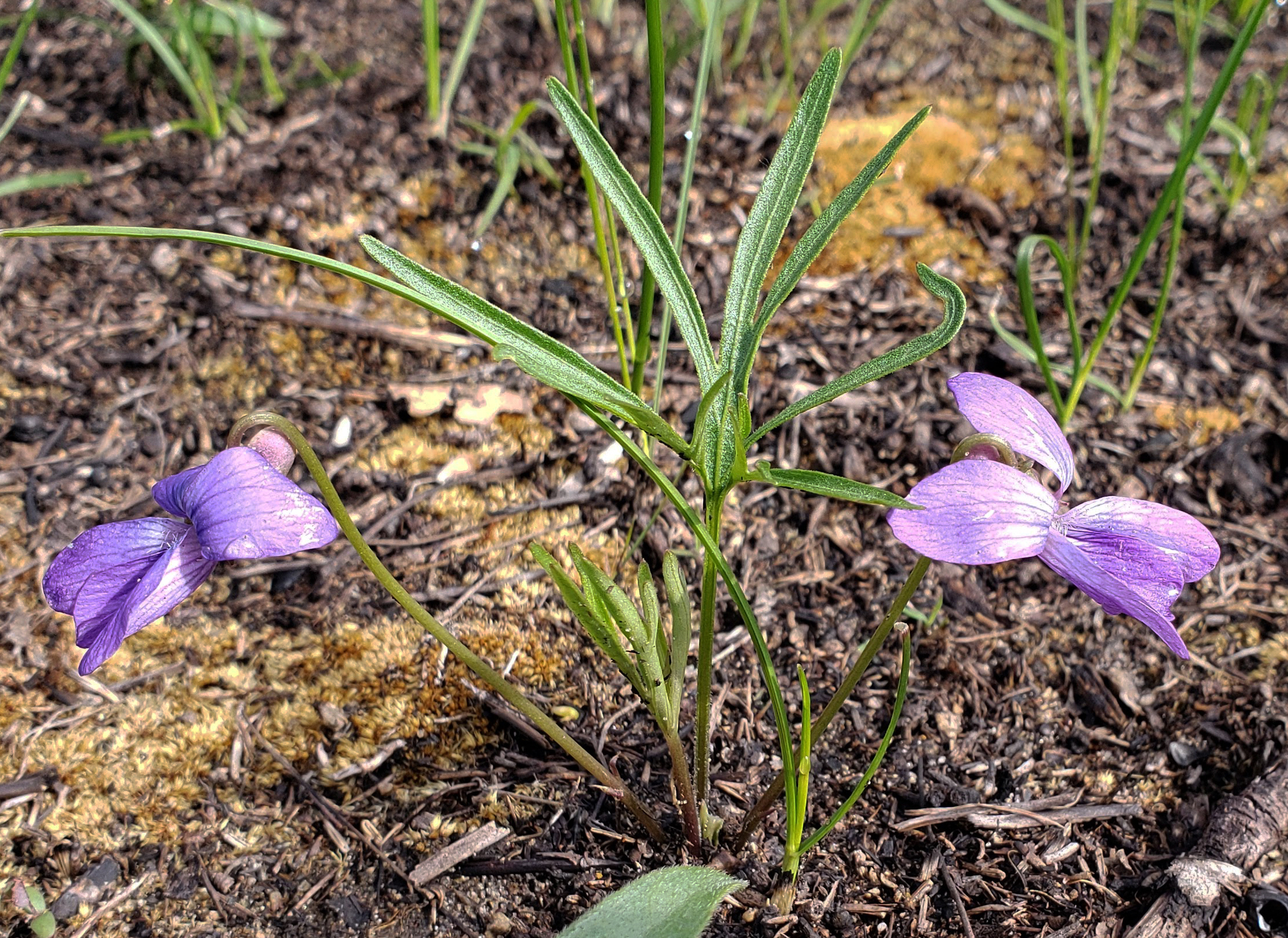
- In Waukesha County, Wisconsin

Scientific classification
- Kingdom: Plantae
- Clade: Embryophytes
- Clade: Tracheophytes
- Clade: Spermatophytes
- Clade: Angiosperms
- Clade: Eudicots
- Clade: Rosids
- Order: Malpighiales
- Family: Violaceae
- Genus: Viola
- Species: V. pedatifida

Binomial name
- Viola pedatifida G.Don

Synonyms
- Viola pedatifida subsp. brittoniana (Pollard) L. E. McKinney; Viola palmata L. var. pedatifida (G.Don) Cronquist

= Viola pedatifida =

Species of flowering plant

Viola pedatifida, known variously as prairie violet, crow-foot violet, larkspur violet, purple prairie violet, and coastal violet, is a perennial herbaceous plant in the Violet family (Violaceae). It is native to Canada and the United States.

== Taxonomy ==
Prairie violet was first formally named in 1831 by the Scottish botanist George Don (1798–1856). The specific epithet pedatifida means "palmately divided with cleft segments" in botanical Latin, in reference to the leaves, which look like a bird's foot with the outer toes again parted.

It may hybridize with the common blue violet, Viola sororia.

== Description ==
Prairie violet grows 5–30 cm (2.0–11.8 in) tall with violet flowers and between 2–11 deeply divided leaves. It is an acaulescent violet, meaning it lacks leaves on the flowering stems. The leaves have 5–9 lanceolate to linear lobes, growing up to 7 cm (2.8 in) long and 8 cm (3.1 in) across. Prairie violet flowers between March and June. The flowers are light violet, the lower three petals white near the base, usually with some hairs. It forms ellipsoid capsules in the summer.

== Distribution and habitat ==
Viola pedatifida is native broadly across the central United States and south-central Canada, from Alberta to Ontario, south to Arkansas, west to New Mexico. It has a disjunct distribution in Virginia where it grows in Appalachian shale barrens. Across much of its range, prairie violet grows in dry prairies and other dry, sunny habitats. It is the provincial flower of the Canadian province of New Brunswick.
