= List of Missouri native plants =

Geobotanically, Missouri belongs to the North American Atlantic region, and spans all three floristic provinces that make up the region: the state transitions from the deciduous forest of the Appalachian province to the grasslands of the North American Prairies province in the west and northwest, and the northward extension of the Mississippi embayment places the bootheel in the Atlantic and Gulf Coastal Plain province.

== Wildflowers, grasses, and other nonwoody plants ==
The wildflowers, grasses, and other nonwoody plants growing in Missouri include the following that start with A or B:

- Adam and Eve orchid (Aplectrum hyemale)
- Adder's tongue Ophioglossum spp.
  - Engelmann’s adder’s tongue (Ophum engelmannii)
  - Southern adder’s tongue (Ophioglossum vulgatum)
  - Bulbous adder’s tongue (Ophioglossum crotalophoroides)
  - Stalked adder’s tongue (Ophioglossum petiolatum)
- American feverfew (Parthenium integrifolium)
- American germander (Teucrium canadense)
- American ginseng (Panax quinquefolius)
- American lotus (Nelumbo lutea)
- American water willow (Justicia americana)
- Ashy sunflower (Helianthus mollis)
- Autumn sneezeweed (Helenium autumnale)
- Bastard toadflax (Comandra umbellata (formerly C. richardsiana))
- Beaked hawkweed (Hieracium gronovii)
- Big bluestem (Andropogon gerardi)
- Bird's-foot trefoil (Lotus corniculatus)
- Bird's-foot violet (Viola pedata)
- Bitterweed or bitter sneezeweed (Helenium amarum)
- Black Medick (Medicago lupulina - non-native)
- Black mustard (Brassica nigra)
- Black-eyed Susan (Rudbeckia hirta)
- Blackberry lily (Iris domestica (formerly Belamcanda chinensis))
- Bloodroot (Sanguinaria canadensis)
- Blue cardinal flower or great blue lobelia (Lobelia siphilitica)
- Blue false indigo (Baptisia australis)
- Blue phlox or wild sweet William (Phlox divaricata)
- Blue vervain (Verbena hastata)

== Trees and shrubs ==
The trees and shrubs growing in Missouri include the following:

- American elm
- American sycamore
- Bald cypress
- Bitternut hickory
- Black walnut
- Black gum
- Black hickory
- Cucumbertree
- Eastern redcedar
- Flowering dogwood
- Gray dogwood
- Hackberry
- Mockernut hickory
- Osage-orange
- Pawpaw
- Red hawthorn
- Red mulberry
- Rock elm
- Roughleaf dogwood
- Sassafras
- Shortleaf pine
- Slippery elm
- Sweetgum
- White walnut
- Winged elm
- Pignut hickory
- Shagbark hickory
- Shellbark hickory
- Water hickory
- Pecan
- Tulip tree
- American chestnut
- American beech
- Black oak
- Blackjack oak
- Bur oak
- Chestnut oak
- Chinkapin oak
- Dwarf chestnut oak
- Northern red oak
- Overcup oak
- Pin oak
- Post oak
- Scarlet oak
- Water oak
- White oak
- Willow oak
- River birch
- American basswood
- American hornbeam
- Black willow
- Sandbar willow
- Peachleaf willow
- American willow
- Eastern cottonwood
- Sweet crabapple
- Sourwood
- American persimmon
- American plum
- Black cherry
- Serviceberry
- Eastern redbud
- Black locust
- Honey locust
- Kentucky coffeetree
- American holly
- Possumhaw
- Carolina buckthorn
- Ohio buckeye
- Sugar maple
- Black maple
- Red maple
- Silver maple
- Boxelder
- Staghorn sumac
- White ash
- Prairie rose
- American hazel
- Black haw
- Highbush blueberry
- Smooth sumac
- Fragrant sumac
- Staghorn sumac
- Nannyberry
- Buttonbush
- Honeysuckle
- Ozark witch hazel

== See also ==
- List of mammals of Missouri
- List of birds of Missouri
- Fauna of the United States
- North American Prairies province
- Appalachian province
- Atlantic and Gulf Coastal Plain province

== See also ==
- Tropicos - Flora of Missouri Project
- List of Missouri Plant Species
