= Bitterweed =

Bitterweed may refer to:

- Any plant in genus Ambrosia; specially Ambrosia artemisiifolia
- Artemisia trifida
- Helenium amarum, native to North America
- Any plant in genus Hymenoxys
- Picris sprengeriana
- Tetraneuris
