= Blue vervain =

Blue vervain is a common name for several plants in the genus Verbena and may refer to:

- Verbena hastata, native to North America
- Verbena officinalis, native to Europe
