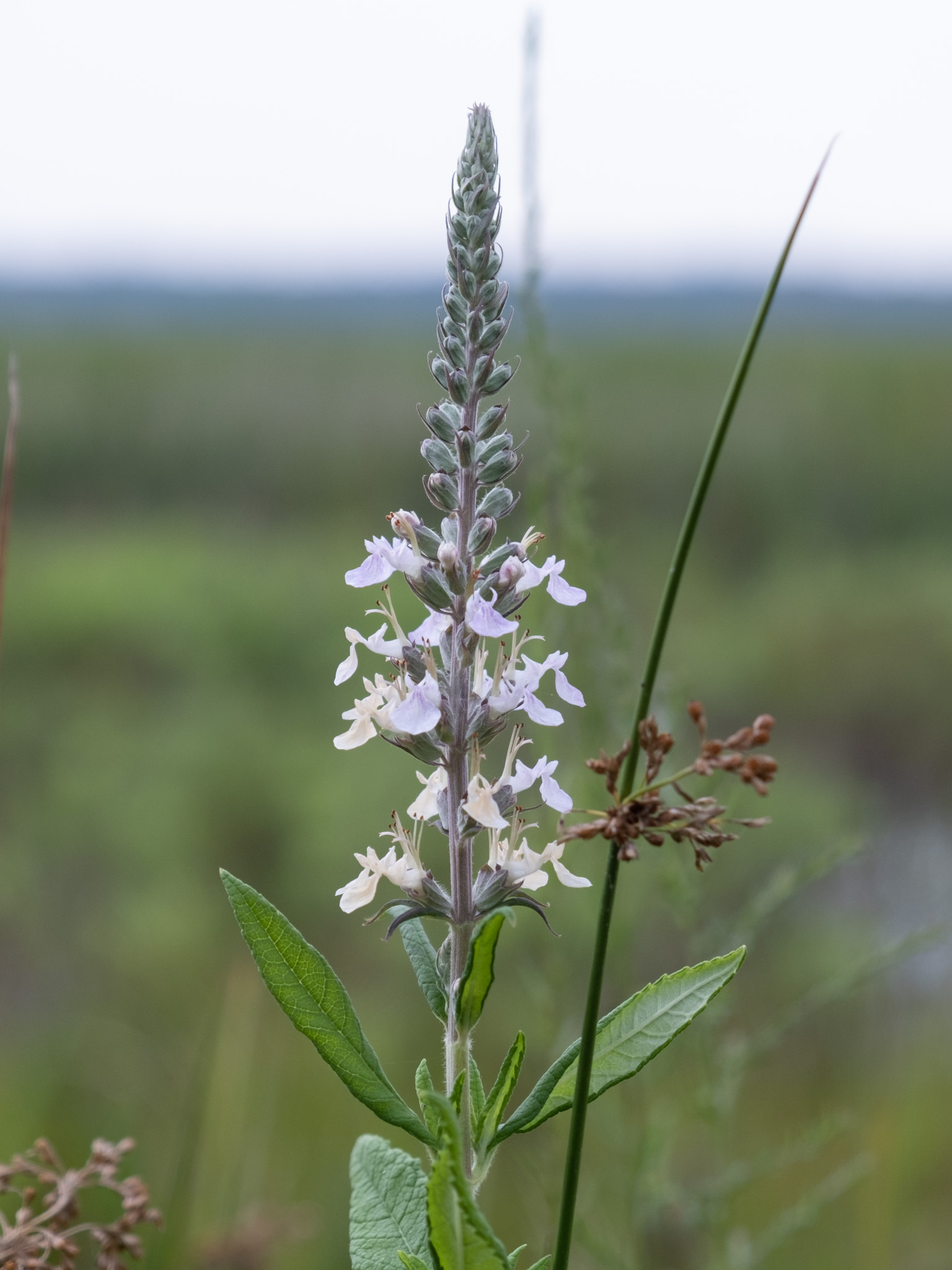

Conservation status
- Secure (NatureServe)

Scientific classification
- Kingdom: Plantae
- Clade: Tracheophytes
- Clade: Angiosperms
- Clade: Eudicots
- Clade: Asterids
- Order: Lamiales
- Family: Lamiaceae
- Genus: Teucrium
- Species: T. canadense

Binomial name
- Teucrium canadense L.

Varieties
- T. canadense var. canadense; T. canadense var. hypoleucum; T. canadense var. occidentale; T. canadense var. virginicum

= Teucrium canadense =

Plant species in the mint family

Teucrium canadense, commonly known as Canada germander, American germander, or wood sage, is a perennial herb in the family Lamiaceae. It is native to North America where it is found across the contiguous states of the United States and in much of Canada.

== Description ==
American germander is a robust perennial plant with a fibrous root system, forming clumps up to 3 ft (90 cm) tall. The upright squarish stems have small side branches, and send out rhizomes at the base. The leaves are opposite, stemmed lower on the plant and unstemmed on the upper sections of the stalk. They are ovate or lanceolate, deeply veined and coarsely toothed, up to 5 in (13 cm) long and 2.5 in (6 cm) wide.

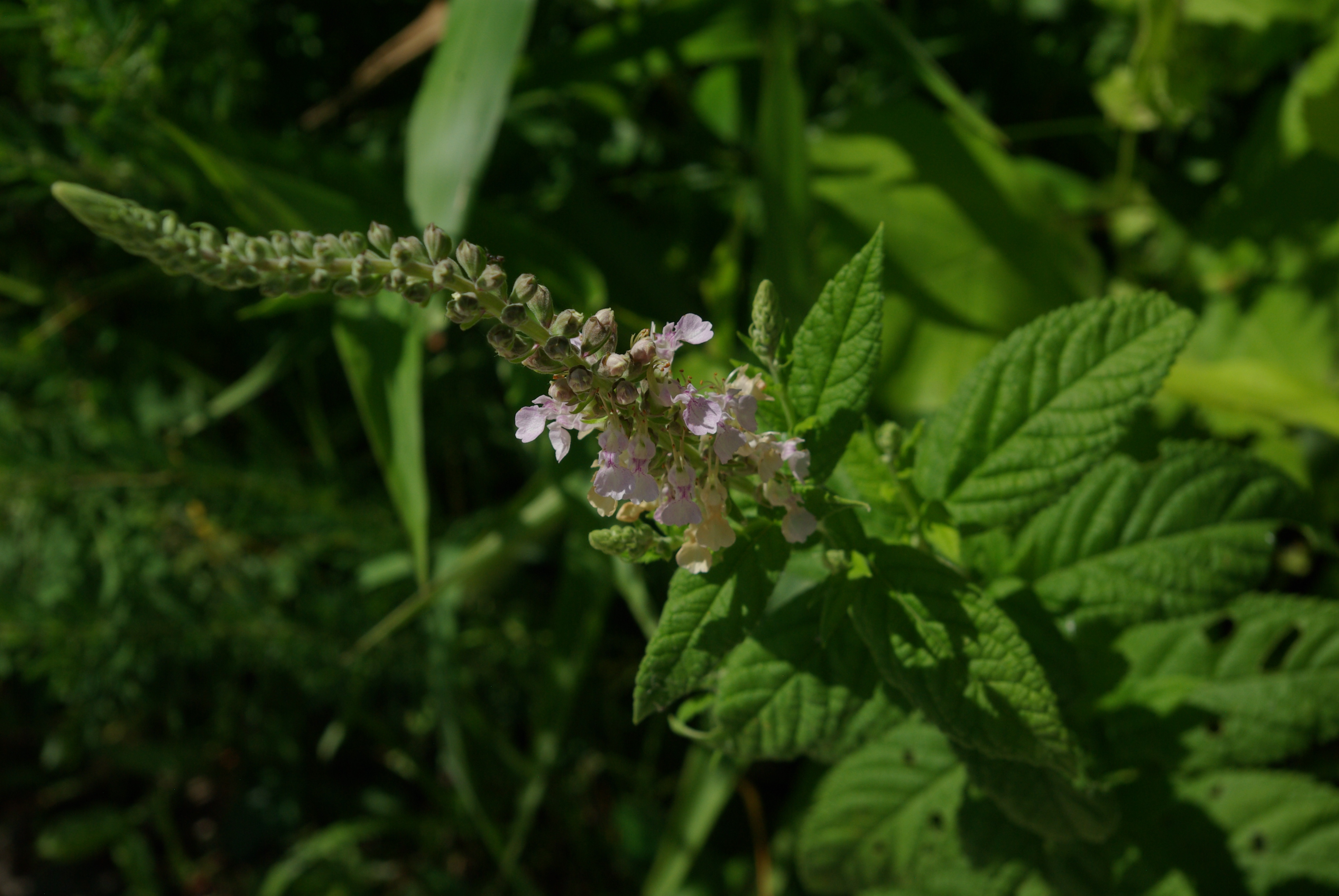
American Germander in Bloom

The terminal inflorescence is a raceme up to 8 in (20 cm) long containing numerous whitish or pale lilac lipped flowers with large shelf-like lower lips. The plant is in bloom from about mid-June for about a month, blooming from the bottom of the raceme upward. The flowers have no scent. The fruits contain four roundish yellowish brown seeds.

== Distribution and habitat ==
The species is native to North America. Its range extends throughout the 48 contiguous states of the United States, and it is also present in much of Canada. It is a common plant, growing in moist grassland, at the edges of forests, in thickets, on river verges and at the edges of marshes. It also grows on wasteland, in poorly-drained areas and beside roadside ditches, and can be somewhat aggressive.

== Ecology ==
The flowers of American germander are adapted for pollination by insects with long tongues, the lower lip providing a platform on which the insects can land. Pollinators include bumblebees, honey bees, digger bees, cuckoo bees and megachilid bees, and the flowers are also visited by flies and butterflies and occasionally by hummingbird moths and hummingbirds. The foliage is unappealing to grazing animals because of its bitter taste.

== Uses ==
American germander contains a number of chemicals with pharmacological properties, such as flavinoids, diterpenoids, tannins, bitter aromatics, volatile oils and glycosides, including saponins. The earliest known use of the plant was by Native Americans who ground the leaves to prepare a herbal tea for use as a diuretic and to promote sweating. The green parts of the plant are also used as an antiseptic wound dressing and made into a tincture for gargling.

== Etymology ==
The genus Teucrium honors King Teucer, king of Troy, who was first to use one of the species of plants to relieve stomach pain and gout. The specific epithet canadense refers to the plant being native (in part) to Canada.
