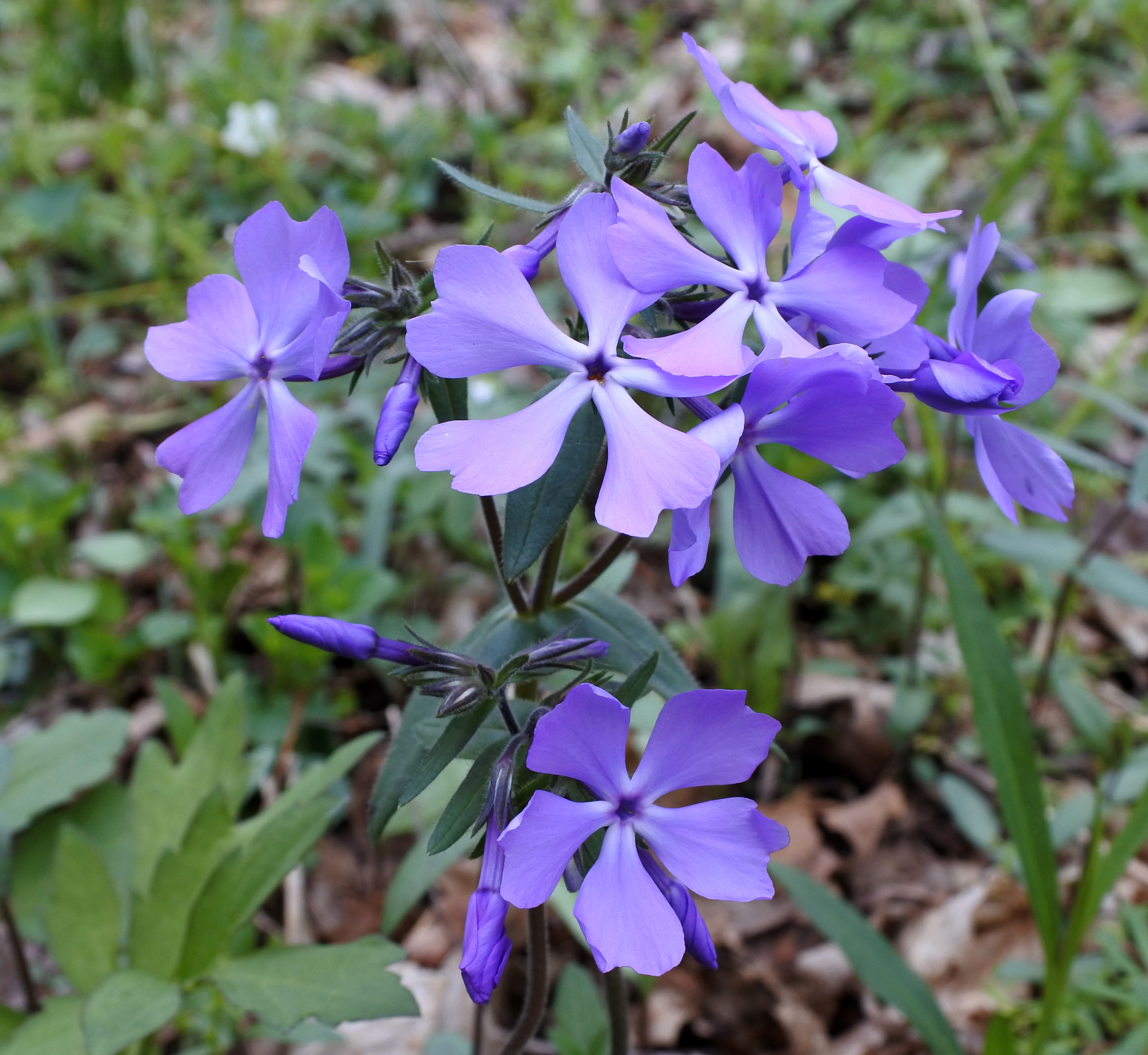

Conservation status
- Secure (NatureServe)

Scientific classification
- Kingdom: Plantae
- Clade: Tracheophytes
- Clade: Angiosperms
- Clade: Eudicots
- Clade: Asterids
- Order: Ericales
- Family: Polemoniaceae
- Genus: Phlox
- Species: P. divaricata

Binomial name
- Phlox divaricata L.
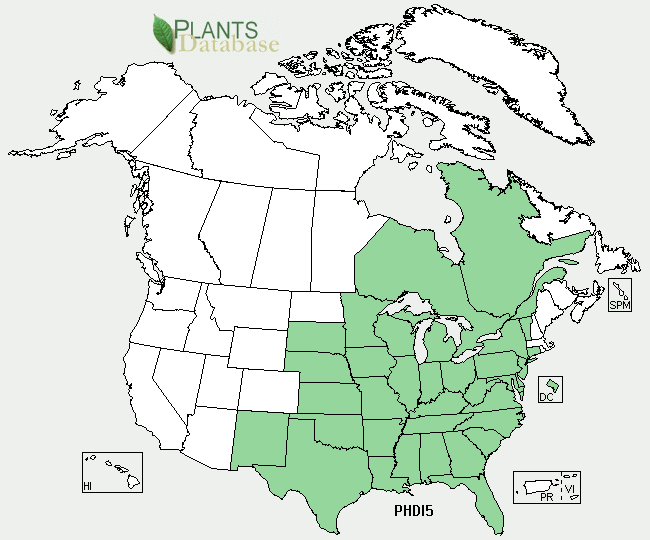
- Natural range in North America

= Phlox divaricata =

Species of flowering plant

Phlox divaricata, the wild blue phlox, woodland phlox, or wild sweet william, is a species of flowering plant in the family Polemoniaceae, native to forests and fields in eastern North America.

== Etymology ==
The species name divaricata means "with a spreading and straggling habit".

== Description ==
Wild blue phlox is a semi-evergreen perennial growing 25–50 cm (10–20 in) tall with opposite, unstalked, hairy leaves 2.5–5 cm (1–2 in) in length and ovate-lanceolate in shape. Flowers appear in late spring and early summer. They are pleasantly fragrant and 2–4 cm (3/4–1 1/2 in) in diameter, with five petals fused at the base into a thin tube. The petals are a variety of pastel colors: blue-lavender, light purple, pink, or white. Flowers bloom March to May. It grows in moist, deciduous woods and bluffs.

There are two subspecies: ssp. divaricata, with petals notched at the tip, and ssp. laphamii, without a notch.

== Ecology ==
Wild blue phlox is most common in the climax successional stage of a community. The flowers produce nectar at the base of the long, narrow corolla tube, and pollen near the end of the corolla tube. Only butterflies, moths, skippers, and long-tongued bees have long enough tongues to drink the nectar. Short-tongued bees and flower flies are unable to reach the nectar, but may gather or feed on pollen.

Phlox is self-incompatible, so it requires cross-pollination to produce seed. Butterflies are the most effective pollinators. As they insert their proboscis into the flower to drink nectar, it contacts the anthers and picks up pollen. As they coil the proboscis before moving to the next flower, most of the pollen falls off, but some remains to be transferred to the stigma of the next flower that they drink nectar from.

== Cultivation ==
Cultivated varieties have various colours, including blue ('Blue Moon'), lavender ('Clouds of Perfume') and white ('Fuller's White', 'White Perfume').

Phlox divaricata and the lavender-flowered cultivar 'Chattahoochee' have both won the Royal Horticultural Society's Award of Garden Merit.

== Gallery ==
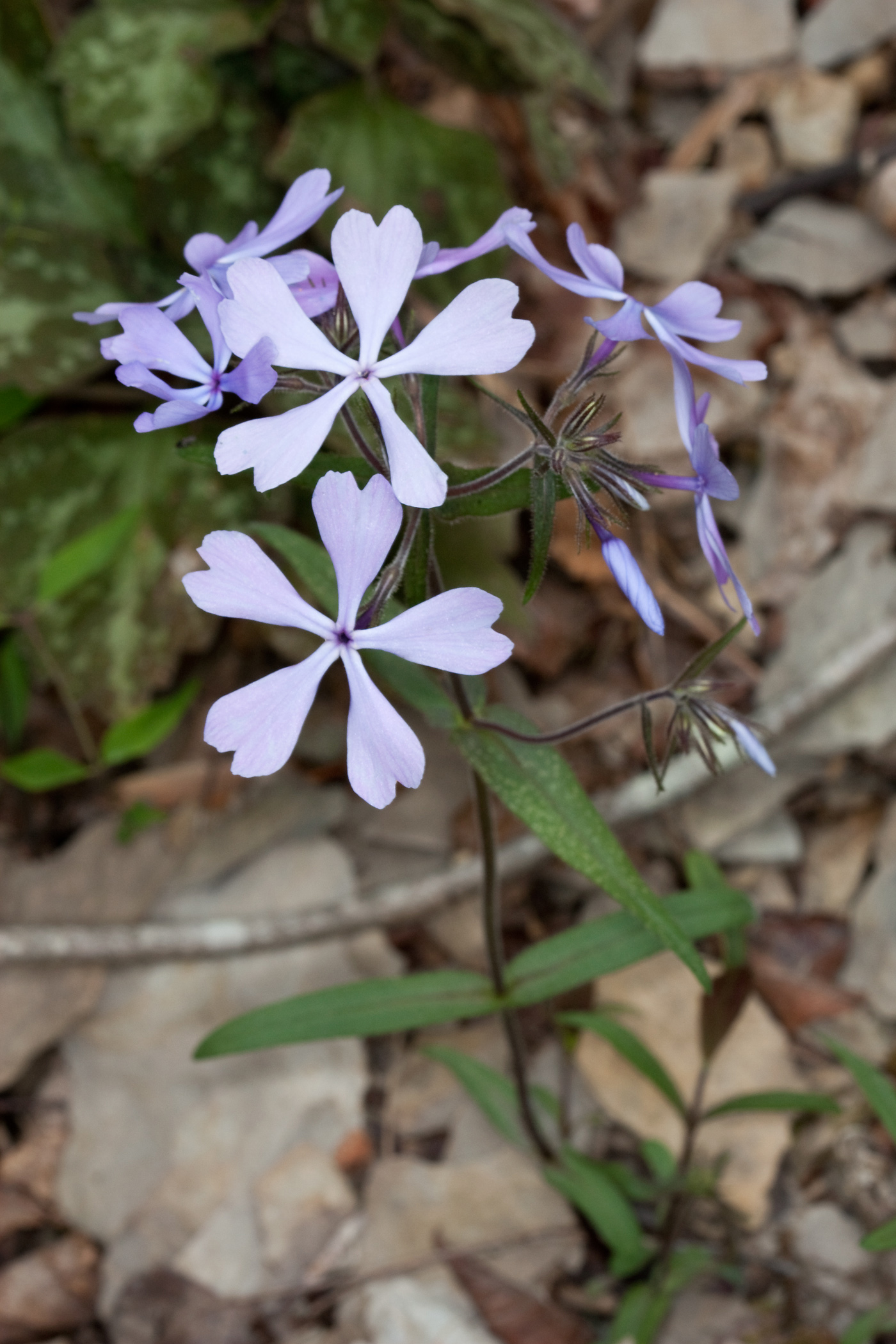
Flowers of P. divaricata ssp. divaricata, with notched ends to the petals

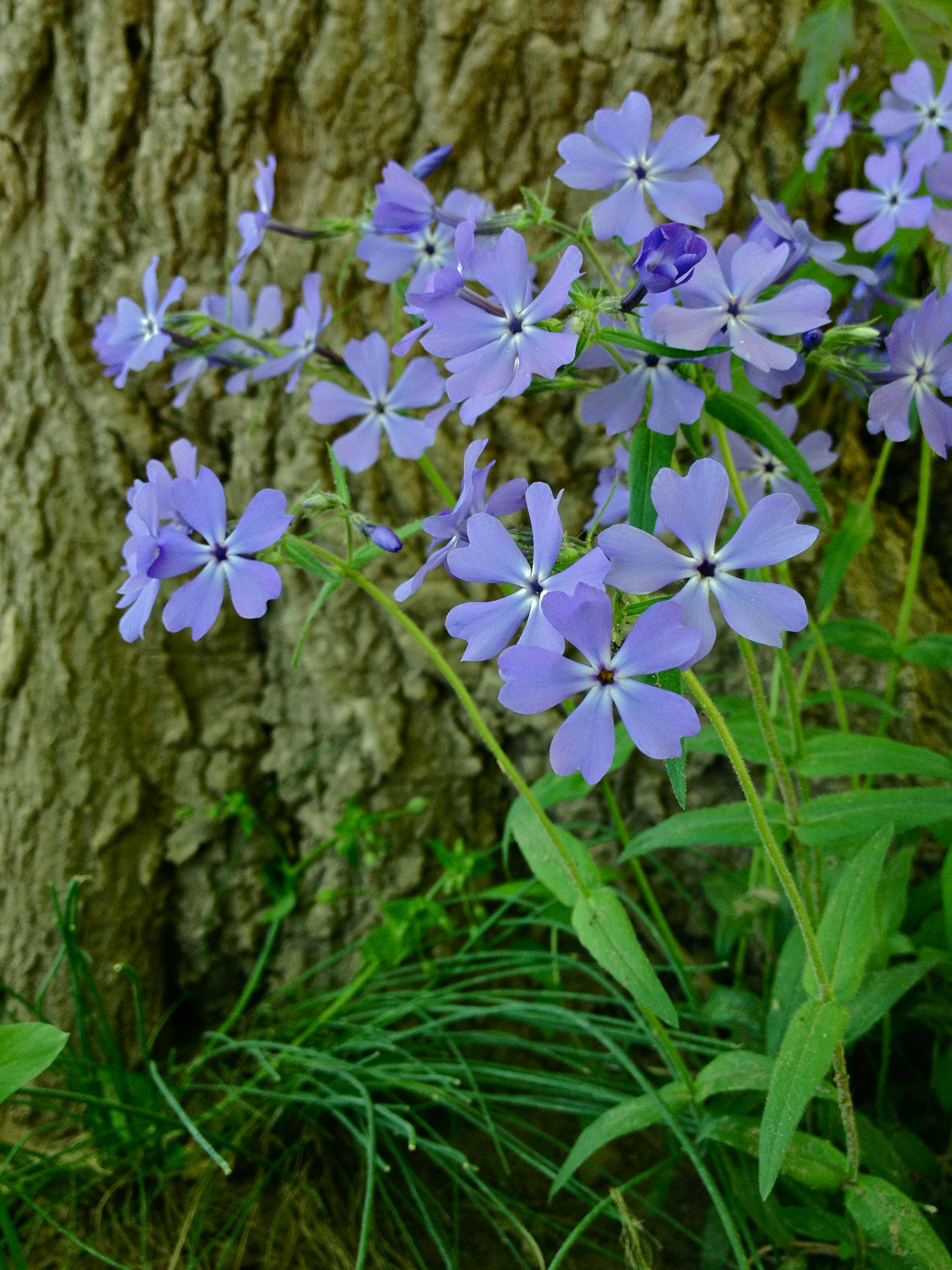
A blue form of P. divaricata ssp. divaricata

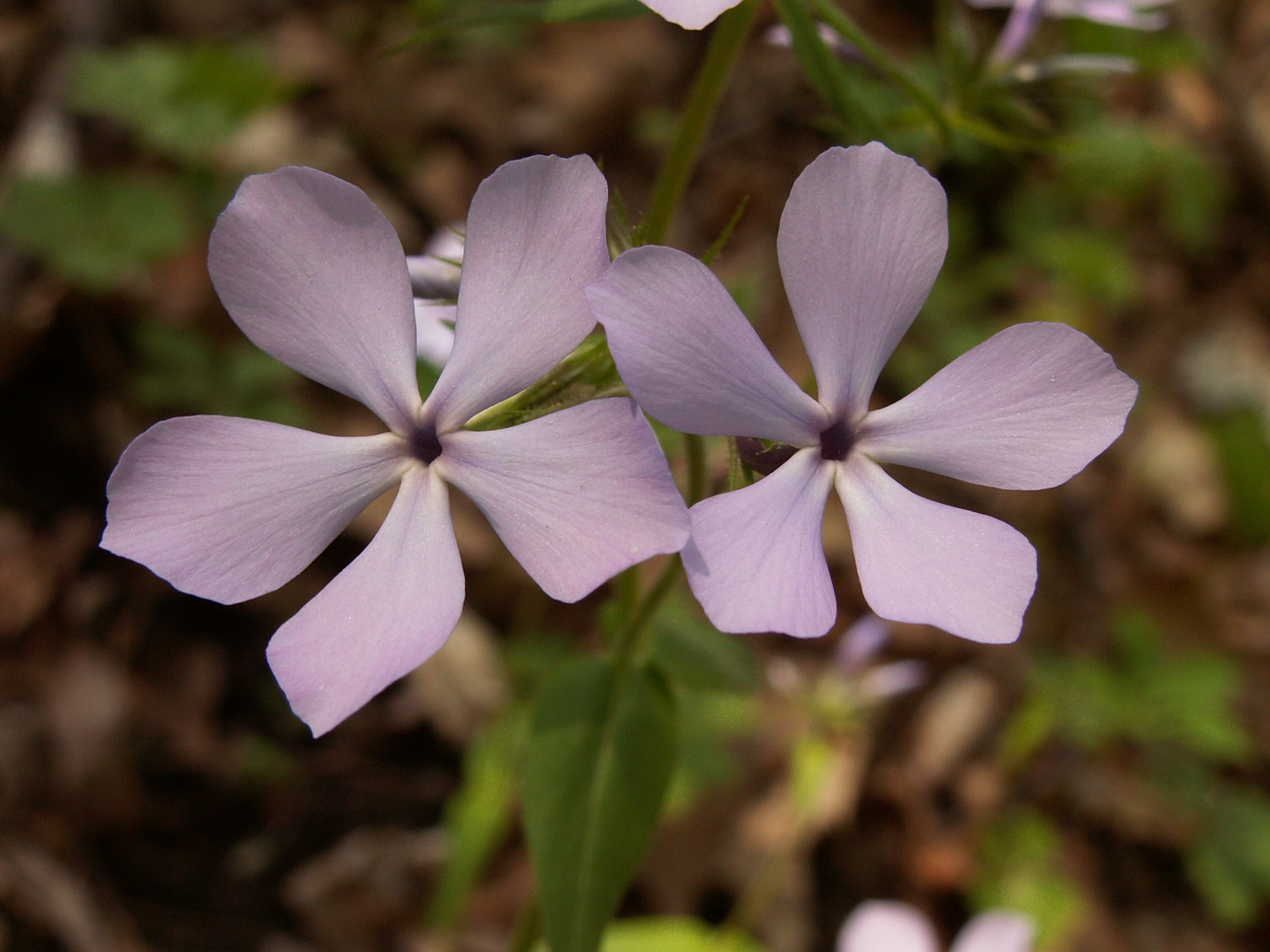
Flowers of P. divaricata ssp. laphamii, without notches on the end of the petals

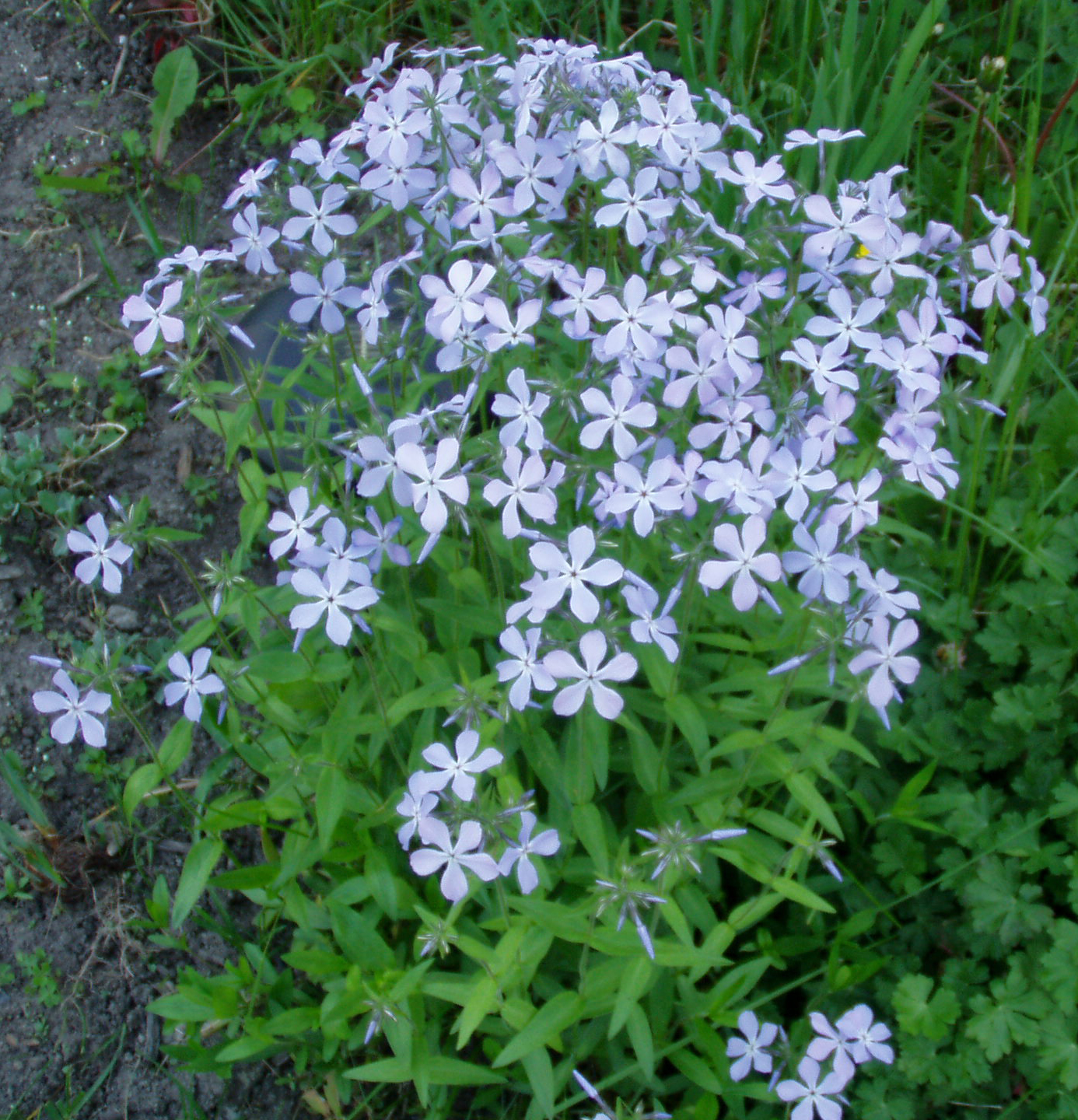
Large clump of P. divaricata ssp. laphamii

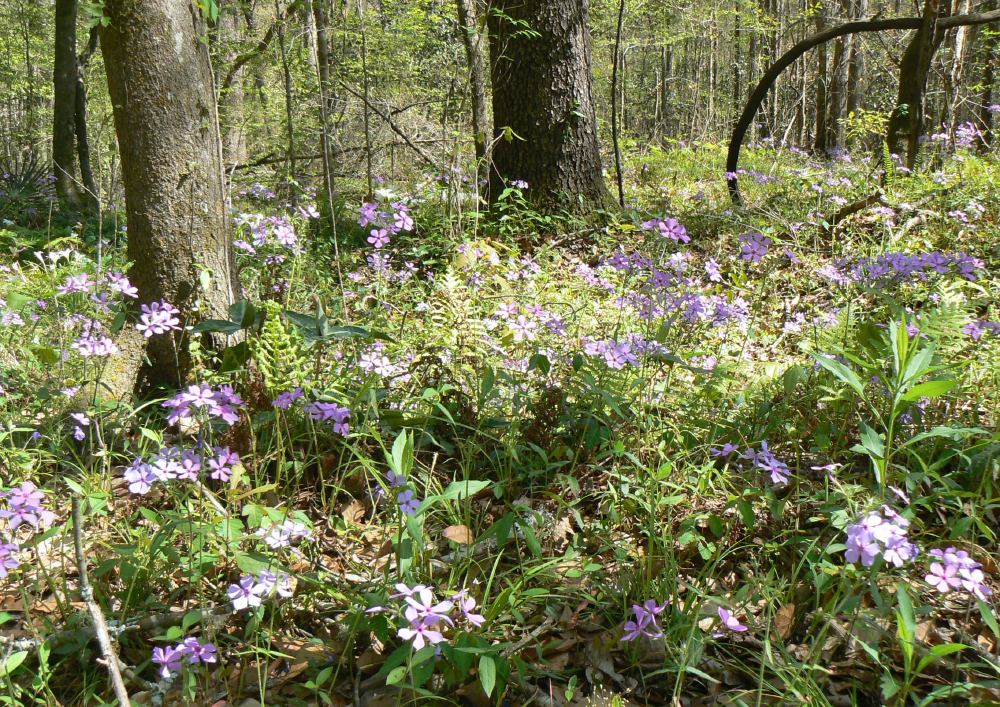
Habitat in Florida

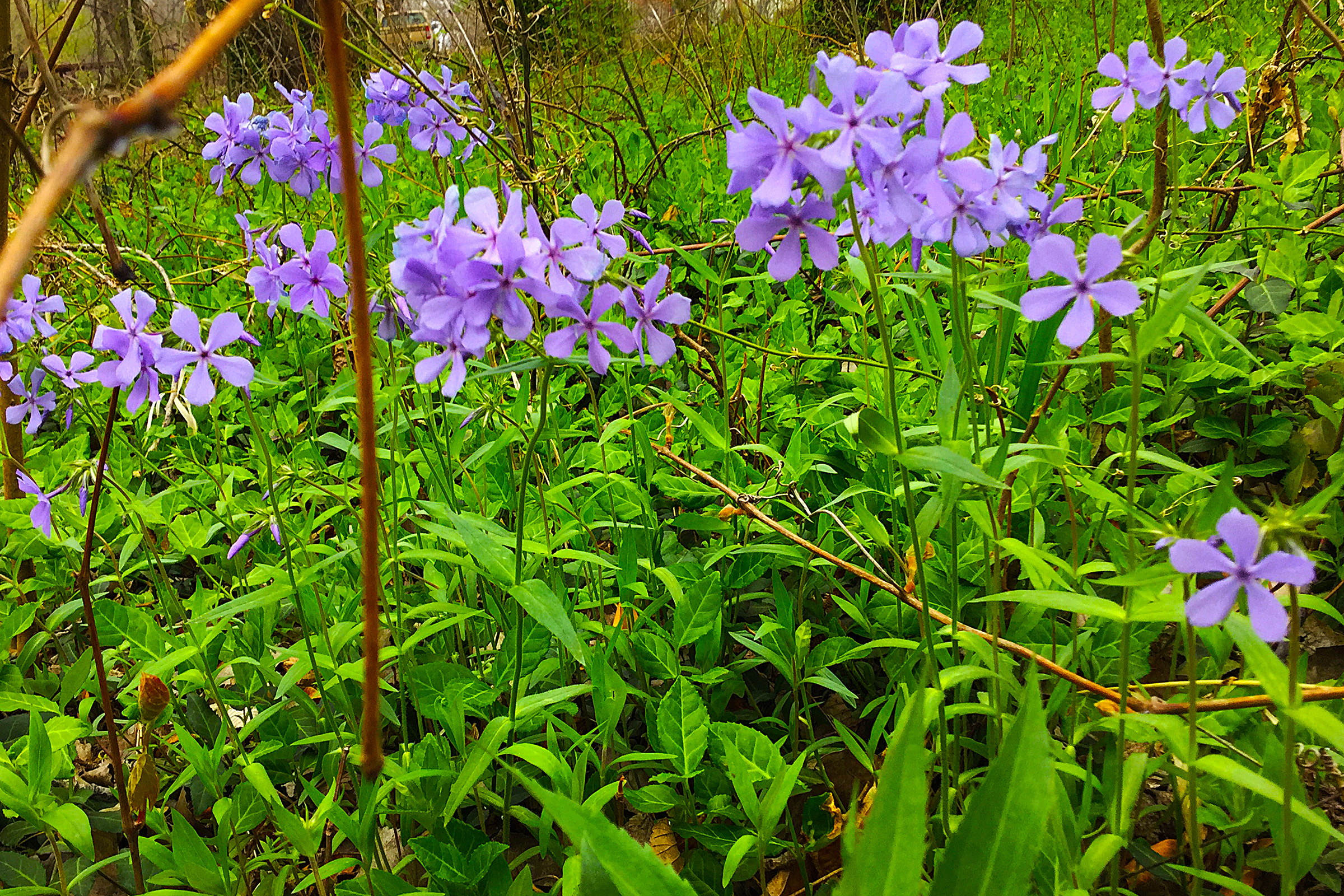
Kansas, Butler County, April
