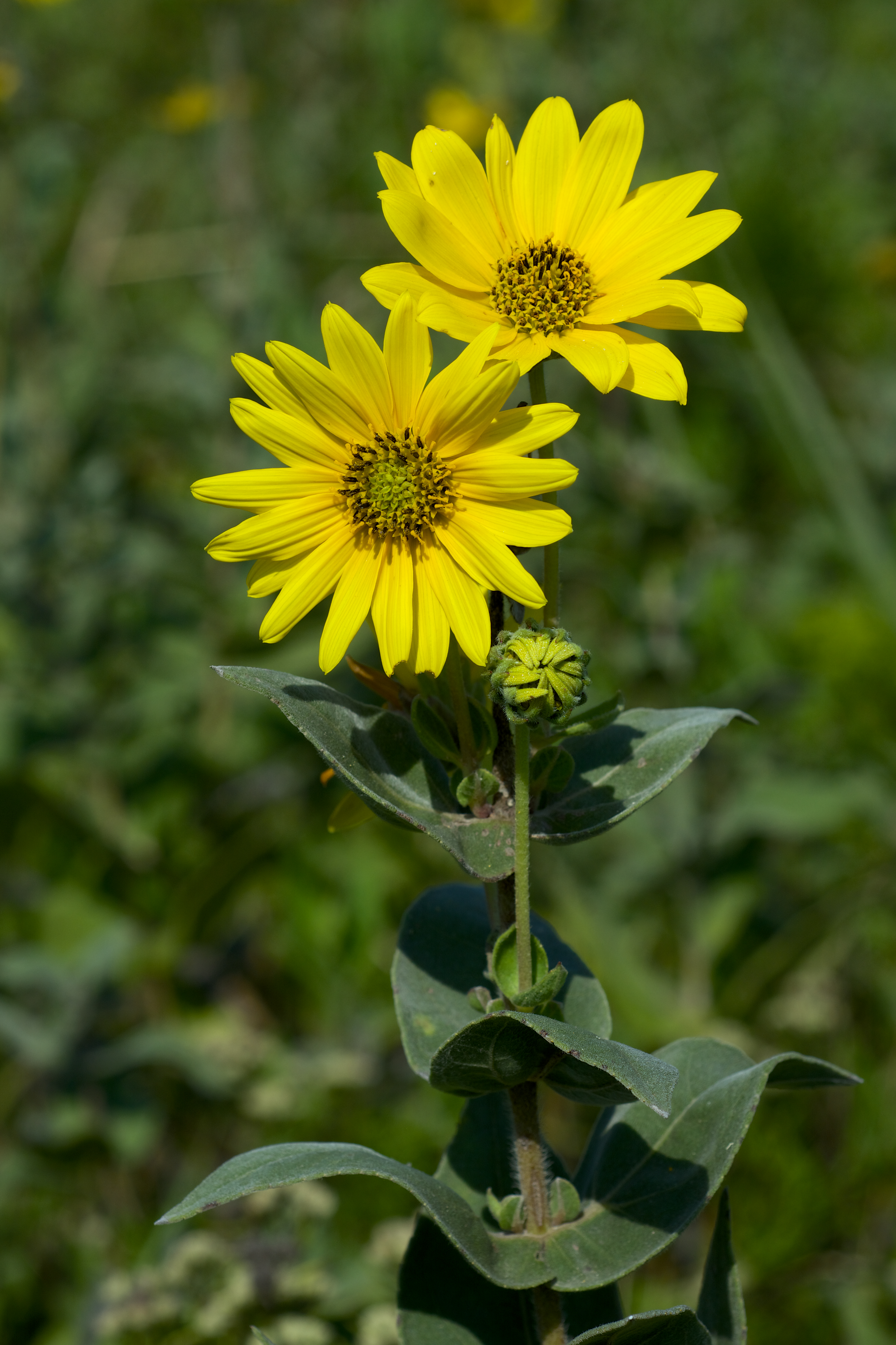

Conservation status
- Apparently Secure (NatureServe)

Scientific classification
- Kingdom: Plantae
- Clade: Tracheophytes
- Clade: Angiosperms
- Clade: Eudicots
- Clade: Asterids
- Order: Asterales
- Family: Asteraceae
- Tribe: Heliantheae
- Genus: Helianthus
- Species: H. mollis

Binomial name
- Helianthus mollis Lam. 1789 not Willd. 1803 nor Buchoz 1783

= Helianthus mollis =

Species of sunflower

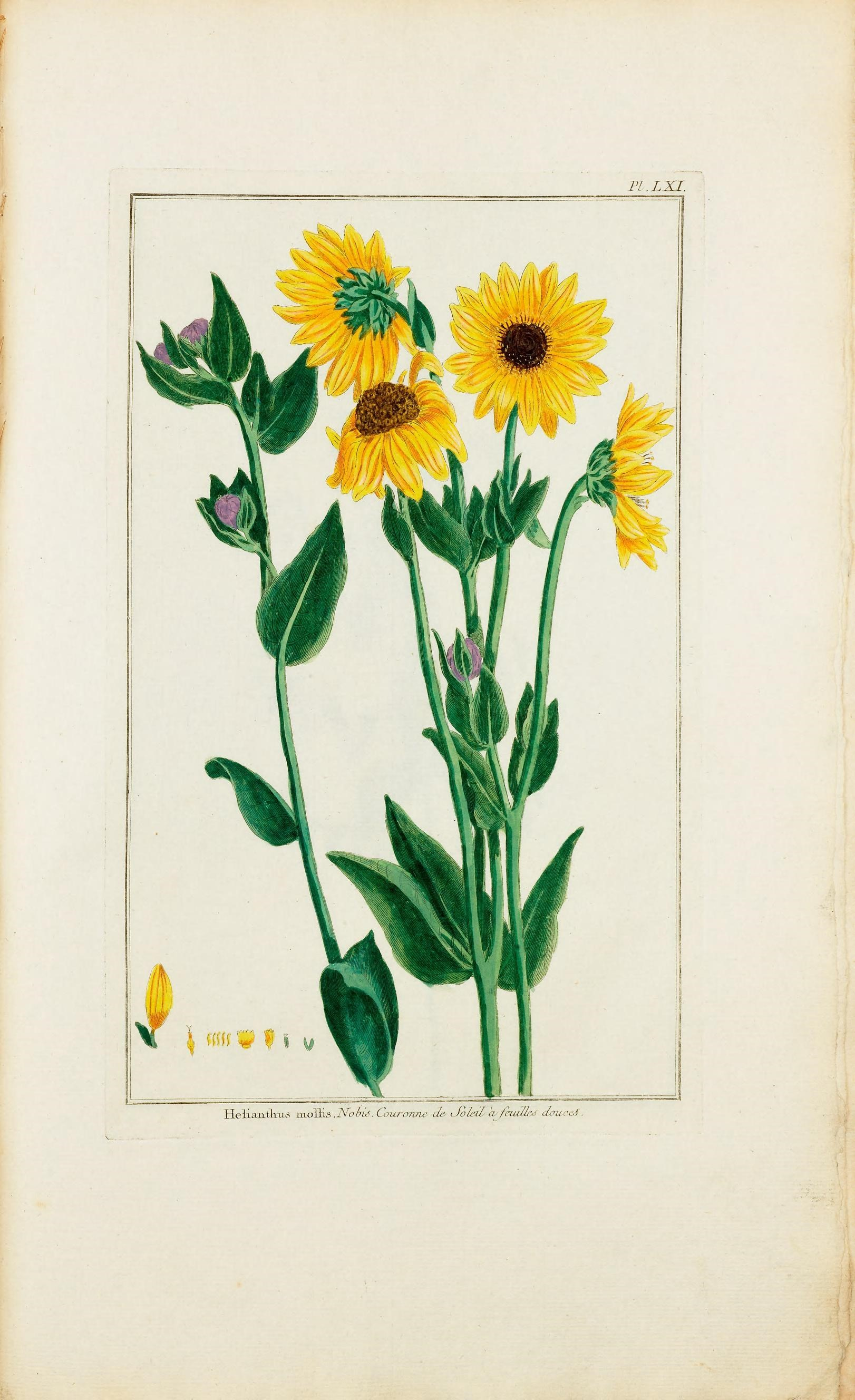

Helianthus mollis is a species of sunflower known by the common names ashy sunflower or downy sunflower. It is widespread across much of the United States and Canada, primarily the Great Lakes region from Ontario south to Texas and Alabama. However, it is considered to be locally endangered within the state of Ohio. Additional populations are found in the states of the Atlantic Coast from Maine to Georgia, but these appear to be introduced.

Helianthus mollis grows on prairies, roadsides, dry open woods, rocky glades, fields, and thickets. It is a perennial herbaceous plant up to 1.5 m (4.9 ft) tall, spreading by means of underground rhizomes. The leaves are mostly along the stem rather than crowded near the base, each egg-shaped with teeth along the edges. One plant produces 1-15 flower heads containing 17-22 yellow ray florets surrounding 75 or more yellow disc florets. Flowers bloom from July to September. The Latin specific epithet mollis means soft and is in reference to the downy plant hairs.
