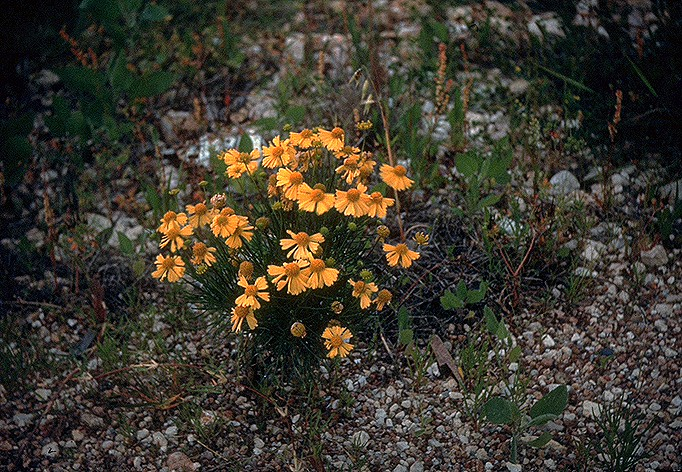

Conservation status
- Secure (NatureServe)

Scientific classification
- Kingdom: Plantae
- Clade: Tracheophytes
- Clade: Angiosperms
- Clade: Eudicots
- Clade: Asterids
- Order: Asterales
- Family: Asteraceae
- Genus: Helenium
- Species: H. amarum

Binomial name
- Helenium amarum (Raf.) H.Rock

Synonyms
- Gaillardia amara Raf.; Galardia amara Raf.; Helenium badium (A.Gray ex S.Watson) Greene

= Helenium amarum =

Species of flowering plant

Helenium amarum is a species of annual herb in the daisy family known by the common names yellowdicks, yellow sneezeweed, fiveleaf sneezeweed, and bitter sneezeweed. It is native to much of the south-central United States (Texas, Oklahoma, Louisiana, Arkansas, New Mexico) and northern Mexico (Chihuahua, Coahuila), and it is present elsewhere in North America, Australia, and the West Indies as an introduced species.

Helenium amarum is a multibranched bushy erect plant reaching 20 to 70 centimeters (8-28 inches) in height and thickly foliated in narrow to threadlike leaves. The tops of stem branches hold inflorescences of many daisy-like flower heads. Each head has a rounded center of sometimes as many as 250 golden yellow disc florets and a fringe of 8-10 usually lighter yellow ray florets which are reflexed away from the center. The fruit is a tiny achene about a millimeter long. This herb is weedy in some areas.

The plant is somewhat toxic to mammals and insects due to the presence of the lactone tenulin.

Varieties

- Helenium amarum var. amarum - United States
- Helenium amarum var. badium Waterf. - Oklahoma, Texas, Chihuahua, Coahuila
