= Endangered Species Act of 1973 =

United States law

- Other short titles: Endangered Species Act of 1973
- Long title: An Act to provide for the conservation of endangered and threatened species of fish, wildlife, and plants, and for other purposes.
- Acronyms (colloquial): ESA
- Enacted by: the 93rd United States Congress
- Effective: December 27, 1973

Citations
- Public law: 93–205
- Statutes at Large: 87 Stat. 884

Codification
- Titles amended: 16 U.S.C.: Conservation
- U.S.C. sections created: 16 U.S.C. ch. 35 §§ 1531-1544.

Legislative history
- Introduced in the Senate as S. 1983 by Harrison A. Williams (D–NJ) on June 12, 1973; Committee consideration by Senate Commerce Committee; Passed the Senate on July 24, 1973 (92–0); Passed the House on September 18, 1973 (390–12, in lieu of H.R. 37); Reported by the joint conference committee on December 19, 1973; agreed to by the Senate on December 19, 1973 (agreed) and by the House on December 20, 1973 (355–4); Signed into law by President Richard Nixon on December 28, 1973

Major amendments
- Pub. L. 95–632, 92 Stat. 3751, enacted November 10, 1978; Pub. L. 96–159, 93 Stat. 1225, enacted December 28, 1979; Pub. L. 97–304, 96 Stat. 1411, enacted October 13, 1982

United States Supreme Court cases
- List: Tennessee Valley Authority v. Hill, 437 U.S. 153 (1978); Lujan v. Defenders of Wildlife, 504 U.S. 555 (1992); Babbitt v. Sweet Home Chapter of Communities for a Great Oregon, 515 U.S. 687 (1995); Bennett v. Spear, 520 U.S. 154 (1997); National Ass'n of Home Builders v. Defenders of Wildlife, 551 U.S. 644 (2007); Weyerhaeuser Company v. United States Fish and Wildlife Service, No. 17-71, 586 U.S. ___ (2018); United States Fish and Wildlife Service v. Sierra Club, No. 19-547, 592 U.S. ___ (2021)

The Endangered Species Act of 1973 (ESA; 16 U.S.C. § 1531 et seq.) is the primary law in the United States for protecting and conserving imperiled species. Designed to protect critically imperiled species from extinction as a "consequence of economic growth and development untempered by adequate concern and conservation", the ESA was signed into law by President Richard Nixon on December 28, 1973. The U.S. Supreme Court described it as "the most comprehensive legislation for the preservation of endangered species enacted by any nation". The purposes of the ESA are two-fold: to prevent extinction and to recover species to the point where the law's protections are not needed. It therefore "protect[s] species and the ecosystems upon which they depend" through different mechanisms.

For example, section 4 requires the agencies overseeing the ESA to designate imperiled species as threatened or endangered. Section 9 prohibits unlawful "take" of such species, which means to "harass, harm, hunt..." Section 7 directs federal agencies to use their authorities to help conserve listed species. The ESA also serves as the enacting legislation to carry out the provisions outlined in The Convention on International Trade in Endangered Species of Wild Fauna and Flora (CITES). The Act is administered by two federal agencies, the United States Fish and Wildlife Service (FWS) and the National Marine Fisheries Service (NMFS). FWS and NMFS have been delegated by the Act with the authority to promulgate any rules and guidelines within the Code of Federal Regulations to implement its provisions.

== History ==
Calls for wildlife conservation in the United States increased in the early 1900s because of the visible decline of several species. One example was the near-extinction of the bison, which used to number in the tens of millions. Similarly, the extinction of the passenger pigeon, which numbered in the billions, caused concern. The whooping crane also received widespread attention as unregulated hunting and habitat loss contributed to a steady decline in its population. By 1890, it had disappeared from its primary breeding range in the north central United States. Scientists of the day played a prominent role in raising public awareness about the losses. For example, George Bird Grinnell highlighted bison decline by writing articles in Forest and Stream.

To address these concerns, Congress enacted the Lacey Act of 1900. The Lacey Act was the first federal law that regulated commercial animal markets. It also prohibited the sale of illegally killed animals between states (interstate commerce). Other legislation followed, including the Migratory Bird Conservation Act, a 1937 treaty prohibiting the hunting of right and gray whales, and the Bald and Golden Eagle Protection Act of 1940.

=== Endangered Species Preservation Act of 1966 ===
Despite these treaties and protections, many populations still continued to decline. By 1941, only an estimated 16 whooping cranes remained in the wild. By 1963, the bald eagle, the national symbol of the U.S., was in danger of extinction in the lower 48 states. Only around 487 nesting pairs remained outside of Alaska. Loss of habitat, shooting, and DDT poisoning contributed to its decline.

The U.S. Fish and Wildlife Service lacked the necessary Congressional authority and funding to protect endangered species. In response to this need, Congress passed the Endangered Species Preservation Act (Pub. L. 89–669) on October 15, 1966. The Act initiated a program to conserve, protect, and restore select species of native fish and wildlife. As a part of this program, Congress authorized the Secretary of the Interior to acquire land or interests in land that would further the conservation of these species.

The Department of Interior issued the first list of endangered species in March 1967. It included 14 mammals, 36 birds, 6 reptiles, 6 amphibians, and 22 fish. A few notable species listed in 1967 were the grizzly bear, American alligator, Florida manatee, and bald eagle. The list included only vertebrates at the time because of the Department of Interior's limited definition of "fish and wildlife." The Endangered Species Preservation Act was superseded in 1973.

=== Endangered Species Conservation Act of 1969 ===
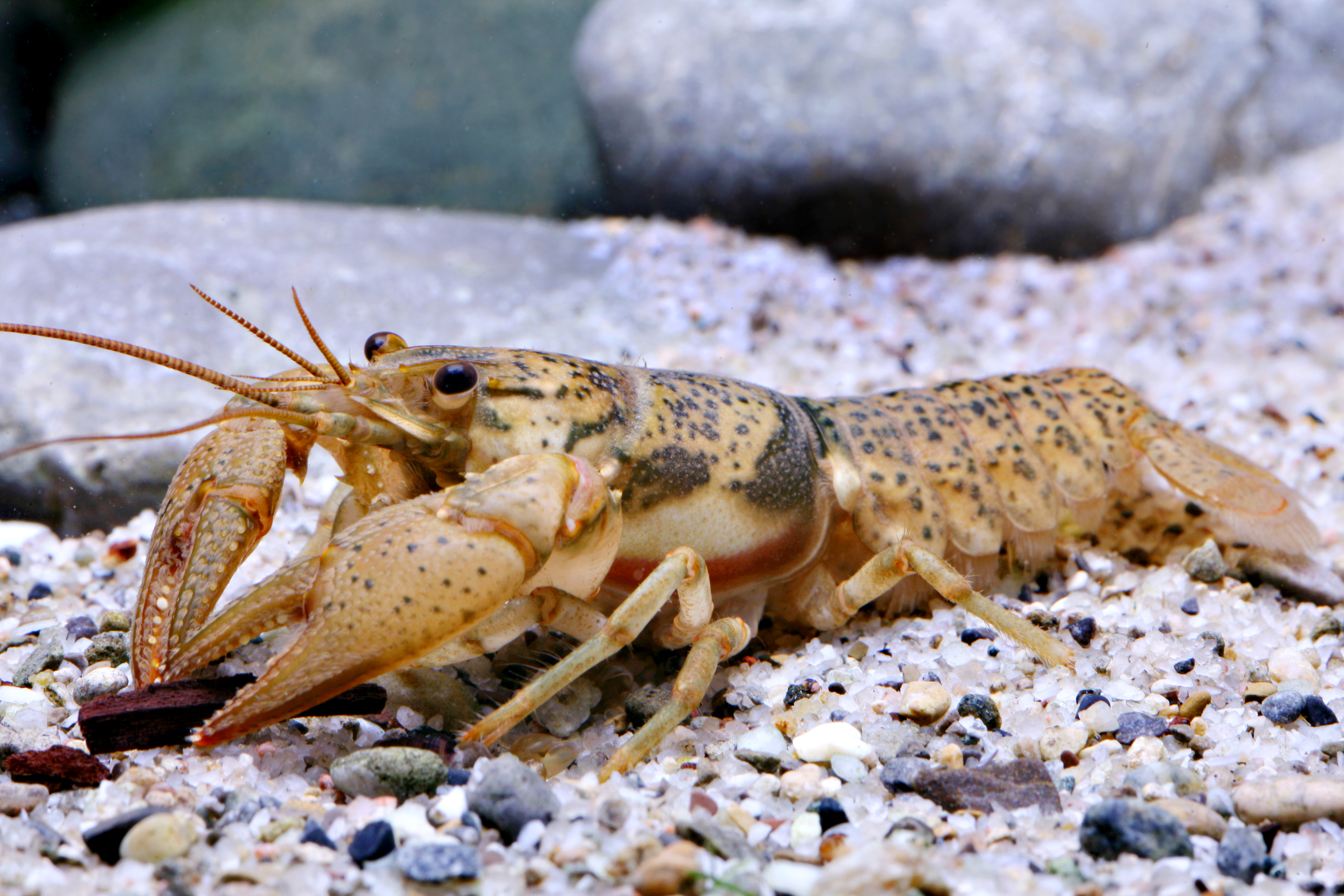
Big Creek Crayfish, Faxonius peruncus, is a threatened crustacean species in the St. Francis River of Missouri.

The Endangered Species Conservation Act of 1969 (Pub. L. 91–135) amended the Endangered Species Preservation Act of 1966. It established a list of species in danger of worldwide extinction. It also expanded protections for species covered in 1966 and added to the list of protected species. While the 1966 Act only applied to 'game' and wild birds, the 1969 Act also protected mollusks and crustaceans. Punishments for poaching or unlawful importation or sale of these species were also increased. Any violation could result in a $10,000 fine or up to one year of jail time.

Notably, the Act called for an international convention or treaty to conserve endangered species. A 1963 IUCN resolution called for a similar international convention. In February 1973 a meeting in Washington, D.C. was convened. This meeting produced the comprehensive multilateral treaty known as CITES, or the Convention on International Trade of Endangered Species of Wild Fauna and Flora.

The Endangered Species Conservation Act of 1969 provided a template for the Endangered Species Act of 1973 by using the term "based on the best scientific and commercial data." This standard is used as a guideline to determine if a species is in danger of extinction.

=== Passage of the 1973 Act ===
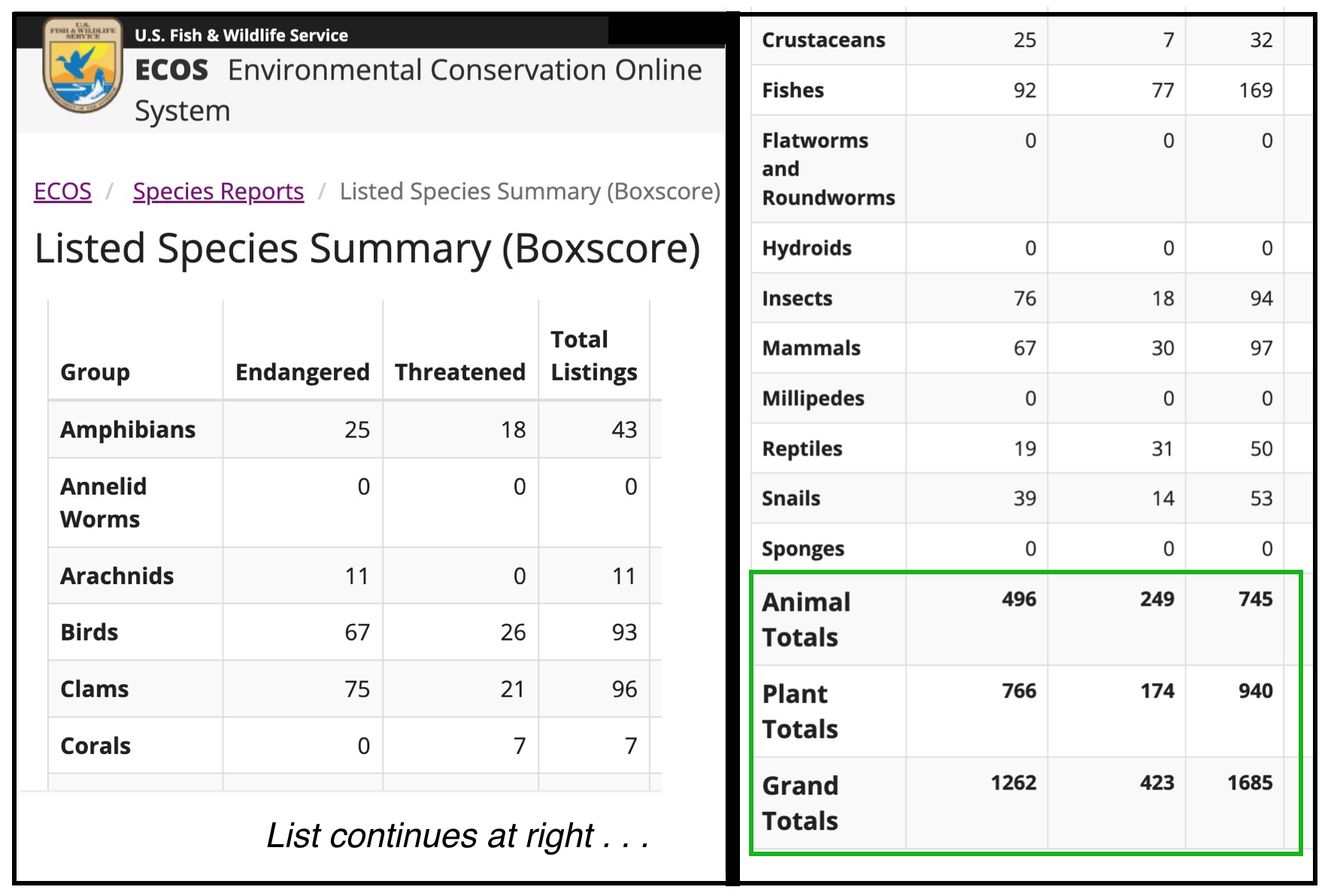
Numbers of domestic species listed as endangered or threatened, as of February 2025. (16 vertebrate species have multiple populations listed).

In 1972, President Nixon declared current species conservation efforts to be inadequate. He called on the 93rd United States Congress to pass comprehensive endangered species legislation. Congress responded with a completely rewritten law, the Endangered Species Act of 1973, which was signed by Nixon on December 28, 1973 (Pub. L. 93–205).

It was written by a team of lawyers and scientists, including Russell E. Train, the first appointed head of the Council on Environmental Quality (CEQ), an outgrowth of the National Environmental Policy Act (NEPA) of 1969. Train was assisted by a core group of staffers, including Earl Baysinger at EPA, Dick Gutting, and Gerard A. "Jerry" Bertrand, a marine biologist. The staff, under Train's leadership, incorporated dozens of new principles and ideas into the landmark legislation but also incorporated previous laws, as was desired by Congressman John Dingell (D-Michigan) when he first proposed the idea of an "Endangered Species Act." Among the staff, Bertrand is credited with having written major parts of the Act, including the infamous "takings" clause, 16 U.S.C. § 1538. "We didn't know what we couldn't do", Bertrand has said about the Act. "We were doing what we thought was scientifically valid and right for the environment."

A law review article published in 2010 reflected on how this now-controversial statute had moved through Congressional passage with so little conflict and need for bargaining:

Essentially no skepticism was expressed about either the law's conservation goals or its regulatory strategies. There was no organized interest group opposition. No one voted against the Senate bill. Twelve members of the House of Representatives initially voted no, but none of them spoke against the bill, and only four persisted in their opposition after the bill came back from the conference committee.

=== Amendments to the Act ===
Significant amendments to the Act happened only four times during the first half-century of the Act's implementation: 1978, 1982, 1988, and 2004. These are listed and summarized on a U.S. Fish and Wildlife Service webpage titled, "History of the Endangered Species Act: Principal Amendments". How the official regulations for implementing the Act have developed and changed through time is more complex and is not available on the agency website.

==== 1978 amendments ====
- Creation of the Endangered Species Committee (later dubbed "the God Squad") that authorized actions that could jeopardize listed species "if the action is exempted by a Cabinet-level committee convened for this purpose."
- "Critical habitat was required to be designated concurrently with listing a species, when prudent, and economic and other impacts of designation were required to be considered in deciding on boundaries."
- The U.S. Forest Service is to be directly involved in "conserving" listed species; and more direction was given for land acquisition.
- While species and subspecies can be petitioned for listing, only vertebrate animals can have one or more populations listed on their own when the species as a whole does not qualify for listing.
- See also Endangered Species Act Amendments of 1978.

==== 1982 amendments ====
- Listing decisions must be made "solely on the basis of biological and trade information, without consideration of possible economic or other effects."
- Listing decisions could be extended beyond the two-year deadline, thus enabling the agency to engage in negotiations with parties that might otherwise sue in court for failure to meet the deadline.
- Establishment of "experimental populations" as a recovery action may entail fewer restrictions than those that apply to where the listed species naturally occurs.
- Whereas listed animals always have "takings" restrictions wherever they are found, plants are now also protected from harm or collection — but only on federal lands.
- Habitat conservation plans may be offered and approved for projects whereby "incidental take" may legally occur. (In practice, such plans are approved because the developer commits to engage in some level of conservation action expected to minimize harm to listed species).

==== 1988 amendments ====
- Monitoring of candidate and recovered species is required, and "emergency listing" can be made if there is evidence of significant risk.
- In addition to listing decisions being offered in draft form (in the Federal Register) for public comment before publication in final, now recovery plans also have to be published in a two-step process. Three elements must be included in a recovery plan: (1) the management actions, (2) objective, measurable criteria for downlisting and delisting, and (3) estimated time and cost for achieving recovery.
- Congress must be given annual financial reports that list on a species-by-species basis "all reasonably identifiable expenditures by the Federal government and States that received Section 6 funds." The Cooperative Endangered Species Fund is established "to provide funding for state grants, including land acquisition and planning assistance."
- Protection for endangered plants is extended to include "a prohibition on malicious destruction on Federal land and other 'take' that violates State law."

==== 2004 amendment ====
- The Department of Defense is exempted from critical habitat designations, so long as an "integrated natural resources management plan" has been prepared.

==== Major bills currently in Congress (2025) ====
- "Endangered Species Act (ESA) Amendments Act of 2025" (H.R.1897)
- "Endangered Species Transparency and Reasonableness Act of 2025" (H.R.180)
- "American Sovereignty and Species Protection Act of 2025" (H.R.102)
- "Armed Forces Endangered Species Exemption Act" (H.R. 65)
- "Rename the Endangered Species Act of 1973" (S.2579)
- Full webpage of introduced legislation in current Congress

== Features of the 1973 Act, as amended ==
Seal of the United States Fish and Wildlife Service.

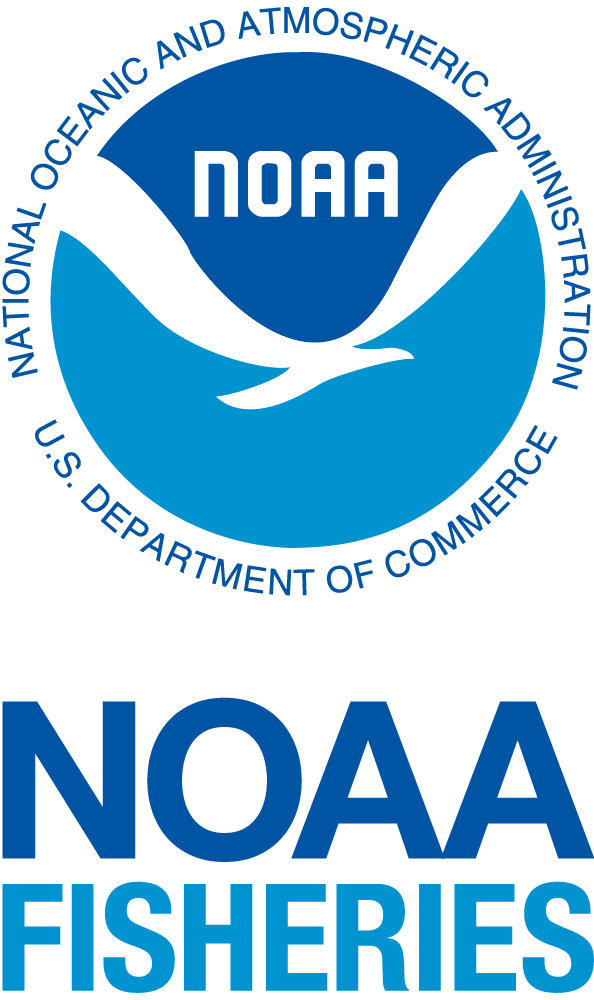
NOAA Fisheries logo.

The Endangered Species Act is administered by two federal agencies, the United States Fish and Wildlife Service (FWS) and the National Marine Fisheries Service (NMFS). NMFS handles most marine species, and the FWS has responsibility over freshwater fish and all other species. Species that occur in both habitats (e.g. sea turtles and Atlantic sturgeon) are jointly managed.

As amended, it consists of 18 sections. Key legal requirements include:

- The federal government must determine whether species are endangered or threatened. If so, they must list the species for protection under the ESA (Section 4).
- If determinable, critical habitat must be designated for listed species (Section 4).
- Absent certain limited situations (Section 10), it is illegal to "take" an endangered species (Section 9). "Take" can mean kill, harm, or harass (Section 3). There is no similar statutory prohibition on the "take" of threatened species, although FWS and NMFS may extend such protections to particular threatened species under certain circumstances (Section 4(d)).
- Federal agencies will use their authorities to conserve endangered species and threatened species (Section 7).
- Federal agencies cannot jeopardize listed species' existence or destroy critical habitat (Section 7).
- Any import, export, interstate, and foreign commerce of listed endangered species is generally prohibited (Section 9).

A 2016 report by the Congressional Research Service offers this summary: "ESA's principal parts are the listing and protection of species, designation of critical habitat and avoidance of its destruction, and consultation by federal agencies regarding actions that may harm listed species." A 2019 report by the Congressional Research Service provides a short summary of "The Legal Framework of the Endangered Species Act."

The 1973 Act is considered a landmark conservation law. Academic researchers have referred to it as "one of the nation's most significant environmental laws." It has also been called "one of the most powerful environmental statutes in the U.S. and one of the world's strongest species protection laws." The Act itself has been amended four times: 1978, 1982, 1988, and 2004. Formal regulations published in the Federal Register that specify how the Act will be implemented have also changed through time. In recent years, U.S. presidential elections that greatly shift environmental priorities have culminated in regulatory shifts in endangered species management back and forth. Congressional elections also affect implementation of the Act via expansions or contractions in annual funding decisions for the agencies.

=== Plants become eligible for listing ===
A distinction of the 1973 Act is that, unlike the previous legislation, plants became eligible for listing. Section 12 directed the Smithsonian Institution "to review (1) species of plants which are now or may become endangered or threatened and (2) methods of adequately conserving such species, and to report to Congress, within one year after the date of the enactment of this Act, the results of such review including recommendations for new legislation or the amendment of existing legislation." As a result, the first plant listings occurred in 1977. Fifty years later, significantly more species of plants were listed in the highest category (endangered) than animals: 766 plants and 486 animals.

The agency maintains a webpage that lists all the endangered and threatened plant species. As of February 2025, the total was 940. Almost all listings are at the species level, but a few are subspecies or varieties.

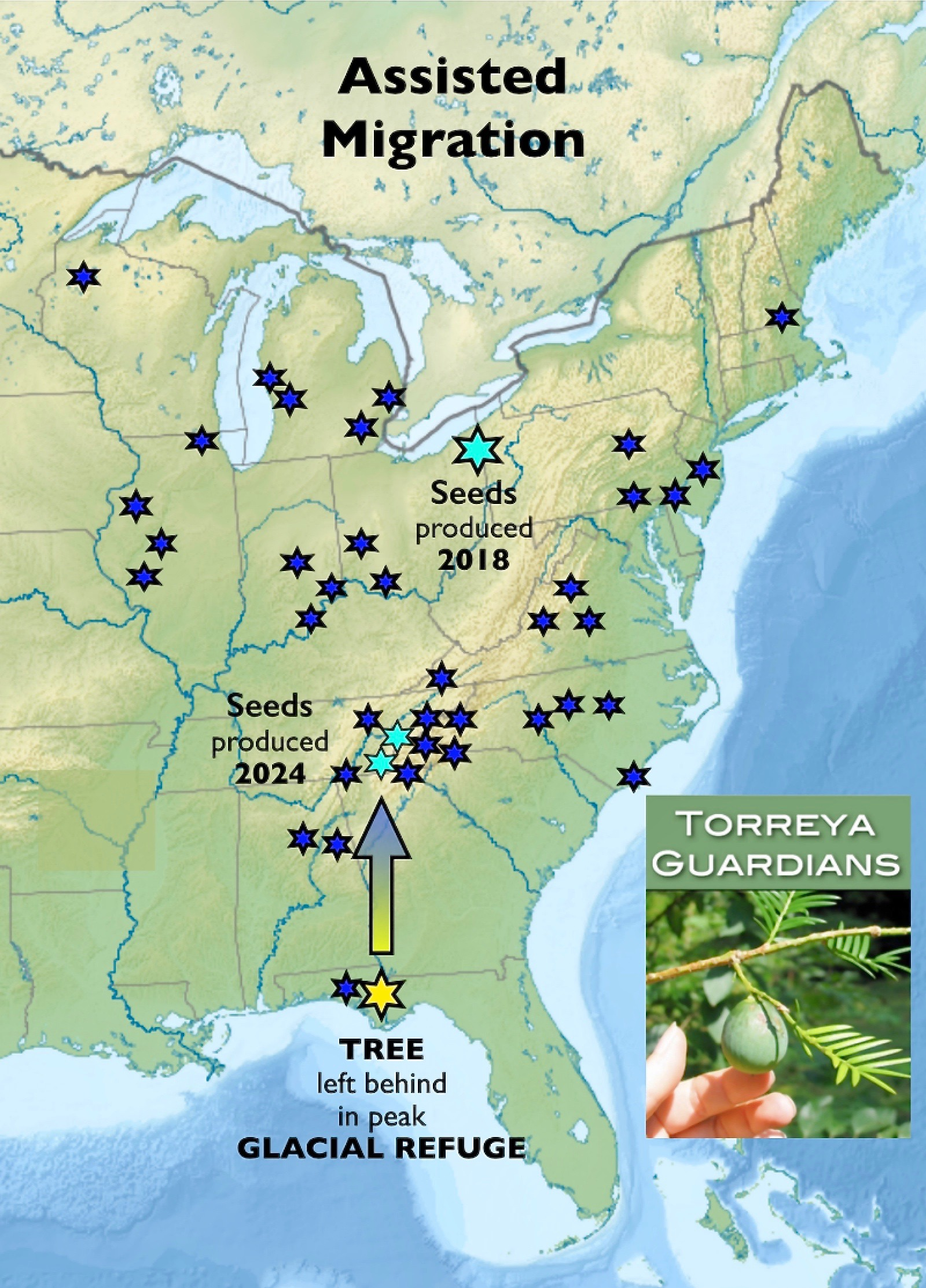
Torreya Guardians homepage image, with Florida torreya tree photo.

Historians attribute this new-found concern for imperiled plants to ongoing global treaty negotiations (especially in 1972 and 1973) toward what would eventually be adopted in 1975 under the title, Convention on International Trade in Endangered Species of Wild Fauna and Flora (CITES). Prior to this time, attention to the conservation needs of native plants had been stalled by complications that do not pertain to animals. How to adequately distinguish plants illegally collected in the wild from plants propagated from seeds or cuttings taken from horticultural specimens was among the points of contention. Ultimately, federal authority over enforcement of endangered plant protections has centered on regulation of interstate commerce of such plants. This legal distinction for plants became controversial in practice when a group of citizens, Torreya Guardians, chose to help an endangered glacial relict plant, Florida Torreya, move to cooler poleward climates before conservation professionals were ready to begin their own experimentation with assisted migration of endangered species. Because movement of seeds and seedlings by this group was noncommercial and based on horticulturally produced specimens, there was no legal apparatus to halt their actions.

Another distinction is that, when an animal is listed as endangered, "taking" of that animal (by capture or killing) becomes a violation of the Act. For plants, "taking" occurs only within the boundaries of federal properties. Even so, states may choose to legislate and enforce prohibitions even on private lands, as occurred in 2023 when the State of California passed a law that prevented killing or removal of the western variety of Joshua tree wherever it was found. Climate change risk was a key factor in the determination.

=== Two categories for listing species ===
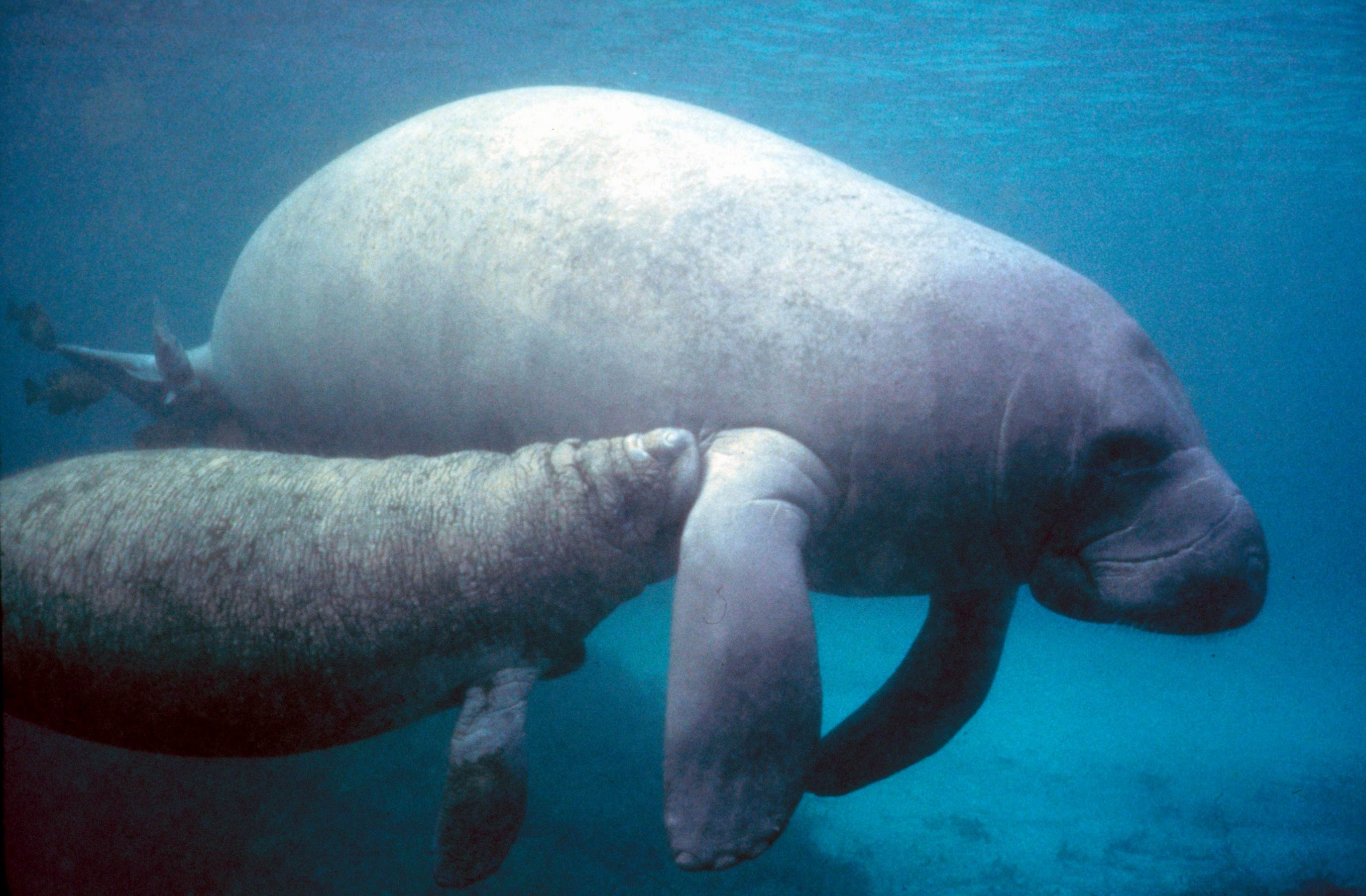
The West Indian Manatee was downlisted to threatened in 2017.

The Act distinguished two grades of species for listing: "endangered" and a lesser category called "threatened". An endangered species is in danger of extinction now; a threatened species faces such a threat in "the foreseeable future." The aim for the lesser "threatened" category is to enable some protective actions by federal agencies at an earlier time, and to encourage state governments to take the lead on conserving such species, such that the causes of population decline might be corrected before more serious concerns develop. Controversy also arises as to whether and what differences in recovery plan elements, and thus management policies and restrictions, should distinguish "threatened" from "endangered." Accordingly, when the West Indian Manatee (whose northward habitat extends into southern Florida) was downlisted in 2017, the U.S. Fish and Wildlife Service stated that "the downlisting will not diminish any existing federal protections."

The agency maintains a webpage that lists all the endangered and threatened animal species. As of February 2025, the total was 742. The set is organized into ten groups and appears on the webpage in this order: amphibians, arachnids, birds, clams, crustaceans, fishes, insects, mammals, reptiles, and snails.

=== Five criteria for making listing decisions ===
The Act specifies the types of causes to be identified in species decline, any one of which might be severe enough to merit listing the species as "threatened" or "endangered." Also known as the "five factors," the set of possible causes entail:

- the present or threatened destruction, modification, or curtailment of its habitat or range
- overutilization for commercial, recreational, scientific, or educational purposes
- disease or predation
- the inadequacy of existing regulatory mechanisms
- other natural or manmade factors affecting its survival

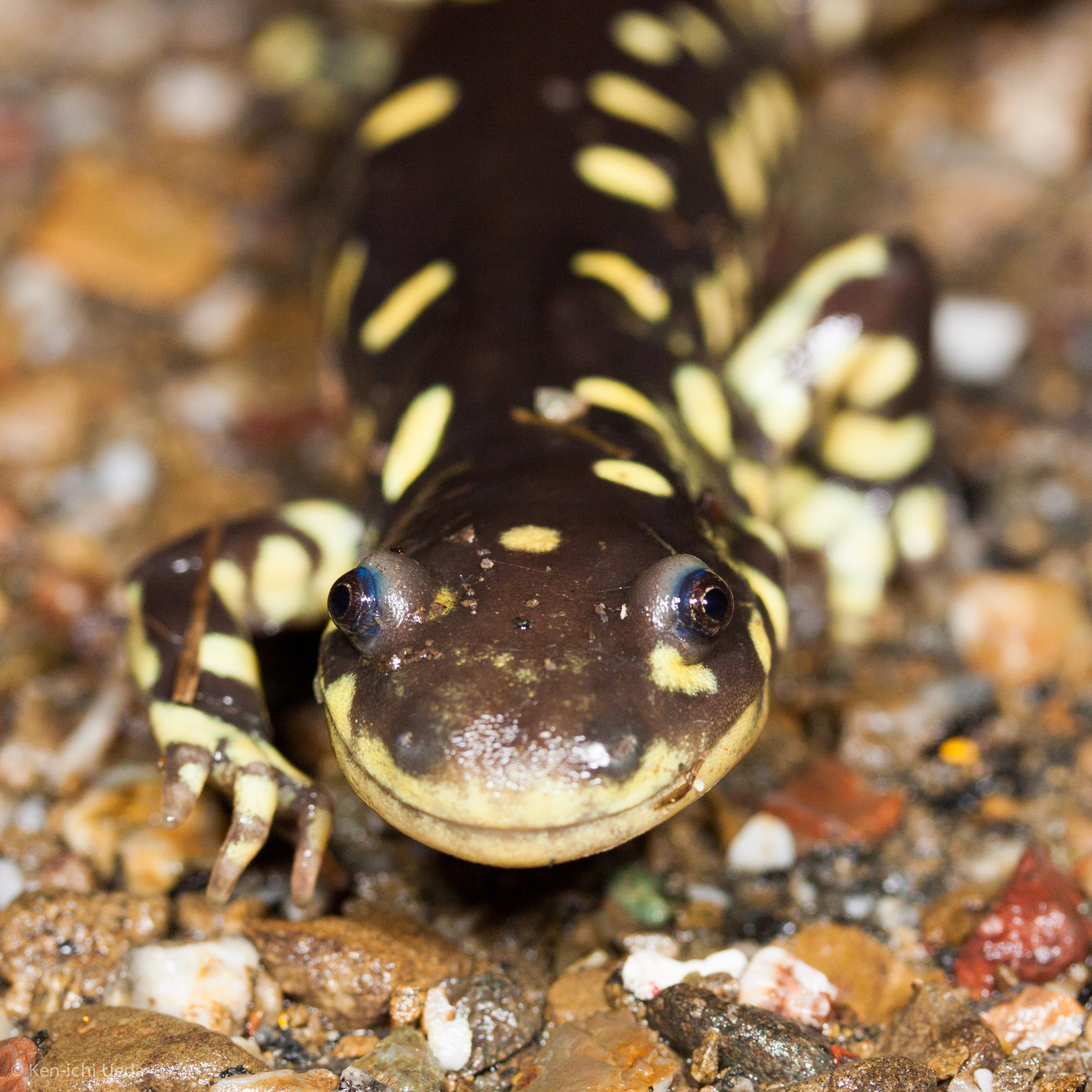
Two populations of California tiger salamander (Ambystoma californiense) were downlisted from endangered to threatened in 2004.

The agency maintains a webpage for the public to access the complete list of endangered animals and a separate webpage for endangered plants.

The agency also maintains a webpage that lists in tabular format all the species of plants and animals that have been "reclassified" and when that occurred. Total entries on that list were 65 as of February 2025. Some entries are just populations rather than full species or subspecies. For example, at the beginning of the list are two populations of California tiger salamander; one is in Sonoma County and the other in Santa Barbara County. Both were reclassified from endangered to threatened in August 2004.

There is also an online webpage that documents in tabular format all species that have been "delisted." One of the columns is used to distinguish whether the species is foreign or domestic. Some migratory birds and mammals (notably, whales) are categorized as "both domestic and foreign." The "delisting date" and "reason for delisting" are also supplied, with the latter coming in several types:

- Species has recovered
- The species is extinct
- New information indicates the species does not meet the definition of an endangered species
- New information indicates the species does not meet the definition of a species

=== Recovery plans must be made and published ===
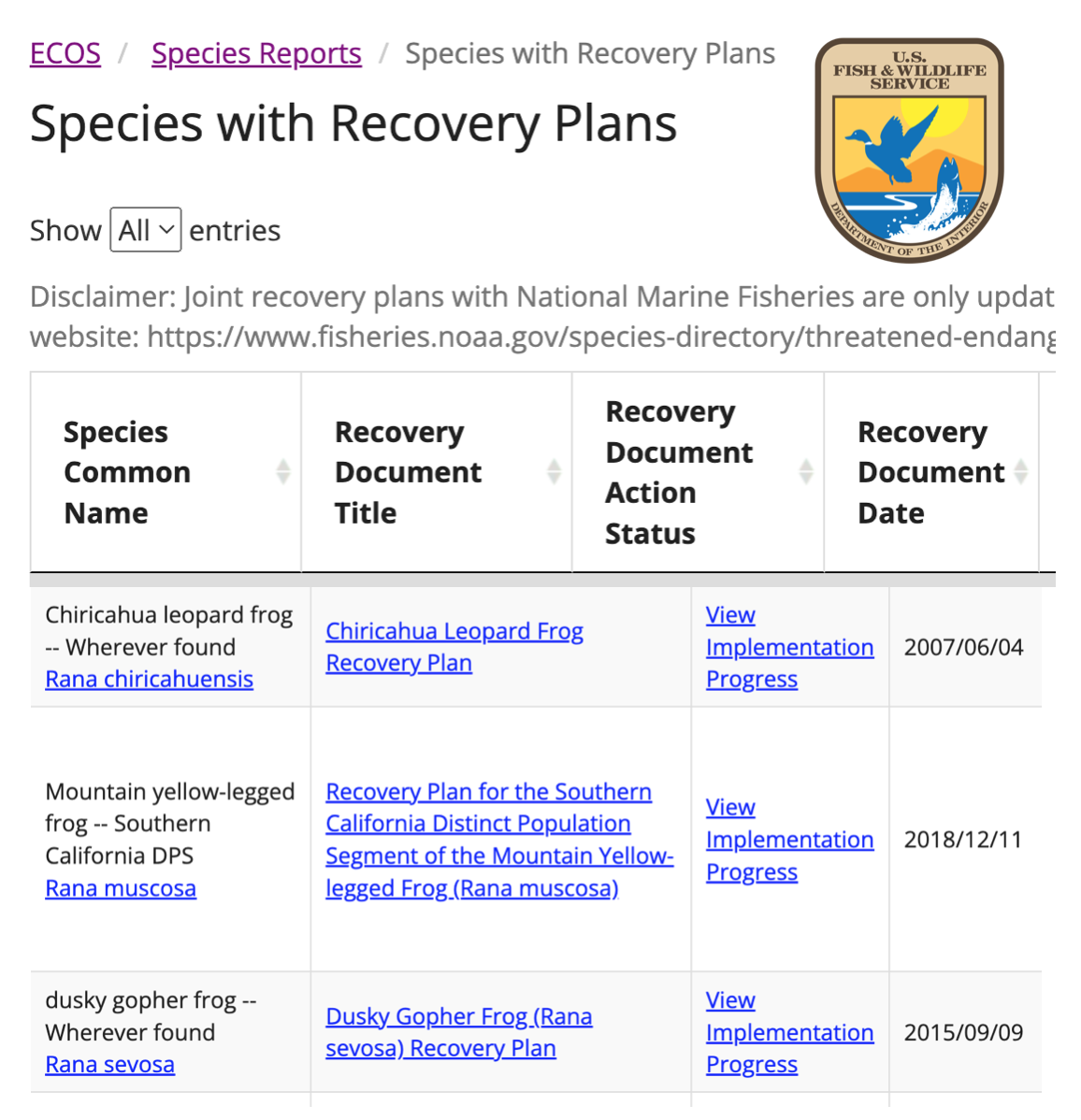
Sample of linked documents available on the "Species with Recovery Plans" page of the Interior Department ECOS website.

A key provision of the 1973 Act was that "preventing extinction" would no longer be sufficient. Rather, "recovery" of listed species, such that "delisting" could ensue, became a stated goal.

Recovery plans were to be developed and published by the two agencies in charge: the United States Fish and Wildlife Service and the National Marine Fisheries Service. Existing recovery plans, along with opportunities to "view implementation progress" are available online. Amendments to the law in 1988 required recovery plans to be published in a two-step process, draft and final, for facilitating public comments. Another agency webpage lists and links the recovery plans still in draft.

While agency regulations and policies direct many of the methods and standards for developing and publishing recovery plans, the 1988 amendments required by law these three elements:

- the management actions
- objective, measurable criteria for downlisting and delisting
- estimated time and cost for achieving recovery

The complications and controversies arising during recovery plan development and approval have meant that the two-year deadline for producing a plan after a new species is listed have sometimes met with long delays.

=== "Critical habitat" may be designated ===
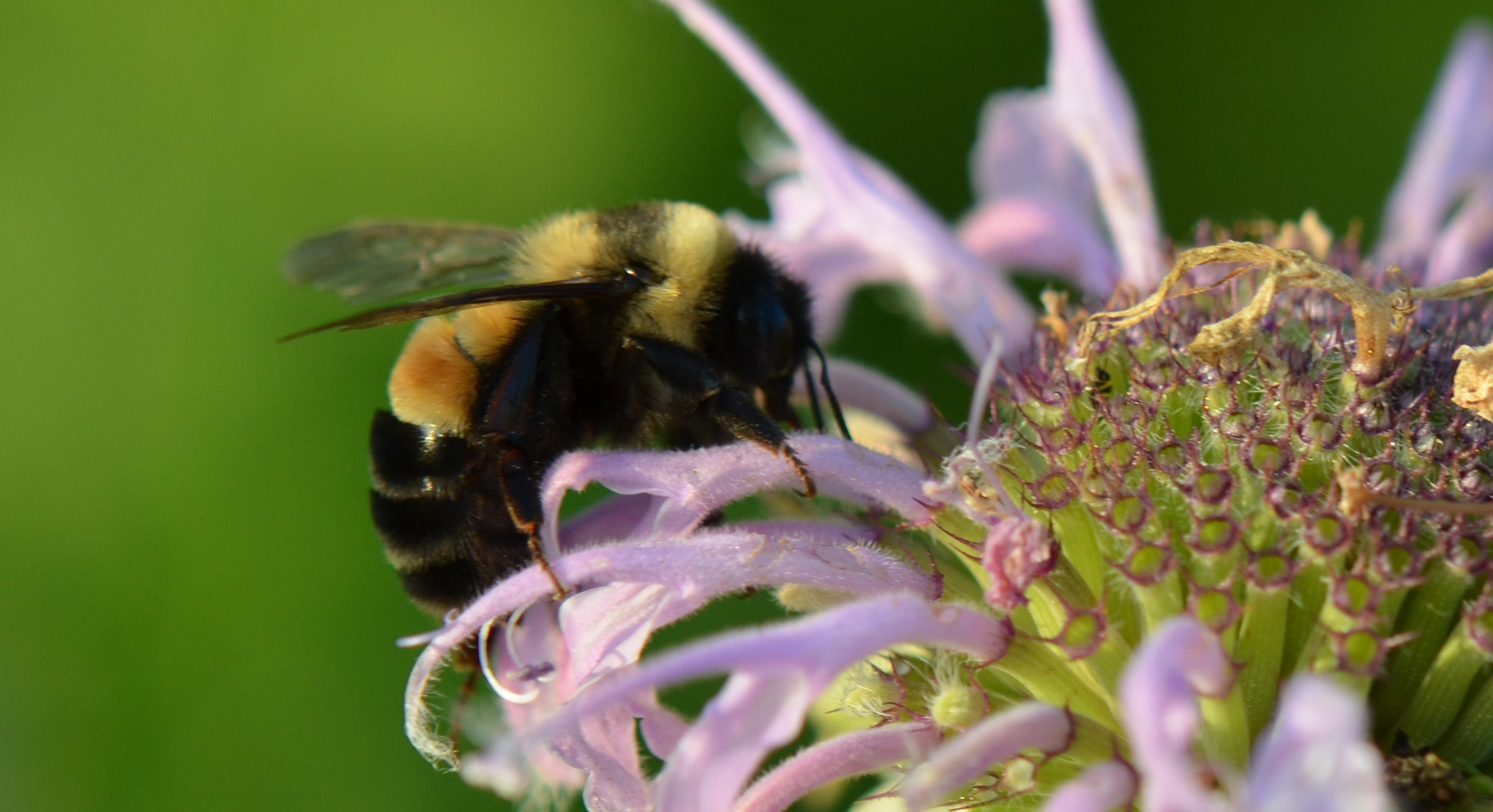
Rusty patched Bumblebee.

The 1973 Act introduced the concept of what is now called "critical habitat" in only one brief passage. Section 7 required federal agencies to ensure that actions they authorized, funded, or carried out would not result in "the destruction or modification of habitat of such species which is determined by the Secretary, after consultation as appropriate with affected States, to be critical." When the Act was amended in 1978, "critical habitat" was given a definition and basic terms for how it would be determined and used. The 1978 amendments also provided for the consideration of economic impacts when designating critical habitat, and provided a mechanism for excluding critical habitat where the benefits of exclusion would outweigh the benefits of designating the area as critical habitat. A key distinction in how it is to be determined was summarized in a Congressional Research Service report in 2016:

Although economic factors are not to be considered in the listing of a species as endangered or threatened, economic factors must be considered in the designation of critical habitat. Some habitat areas may be excluded from designation based on such concerns, unless the failure to designate habitat would result in the extinction of the species.

As will be seen in the "Controversies" section, this provision is sometimes challenging to implement for both scientific and political reasons, as when more than a million acres of critical habitat was proposed in 2024 for the rusty patched bumblebee and officially adopted in 2026. As of June 2026, 995 critical habitat documents pertaining to all species are listed and linked online by the agency.

=== Interagency cooperation ===
The Act, as amended, directs all federal agencies to use their authorities to help conserve listed species. Key to this directive is for all to ensure that:

Any action authorized, funded, or carried out ... is not likely to jeopardize the continued existence of any endangered species or threatened species or result in the destruction or adverse modification of habitat of such species which is determined by the Secretary, after consultation as appropriate with affected States, to be critical.

Such actions include: "the granting of licenses, contracts, leases, easements, rights-of-way, permits, or grants-in-aid; or actions directly or indirectly causing modifications to the land, water, or air." In practice, the Environmental Protection Agency, the Army Corps of Engineers, the Forest Service (within the Department of Agriculture), and the Bureau of Land Management (within the Department of Interior) regularly must take action in accordance with this statutory directive.

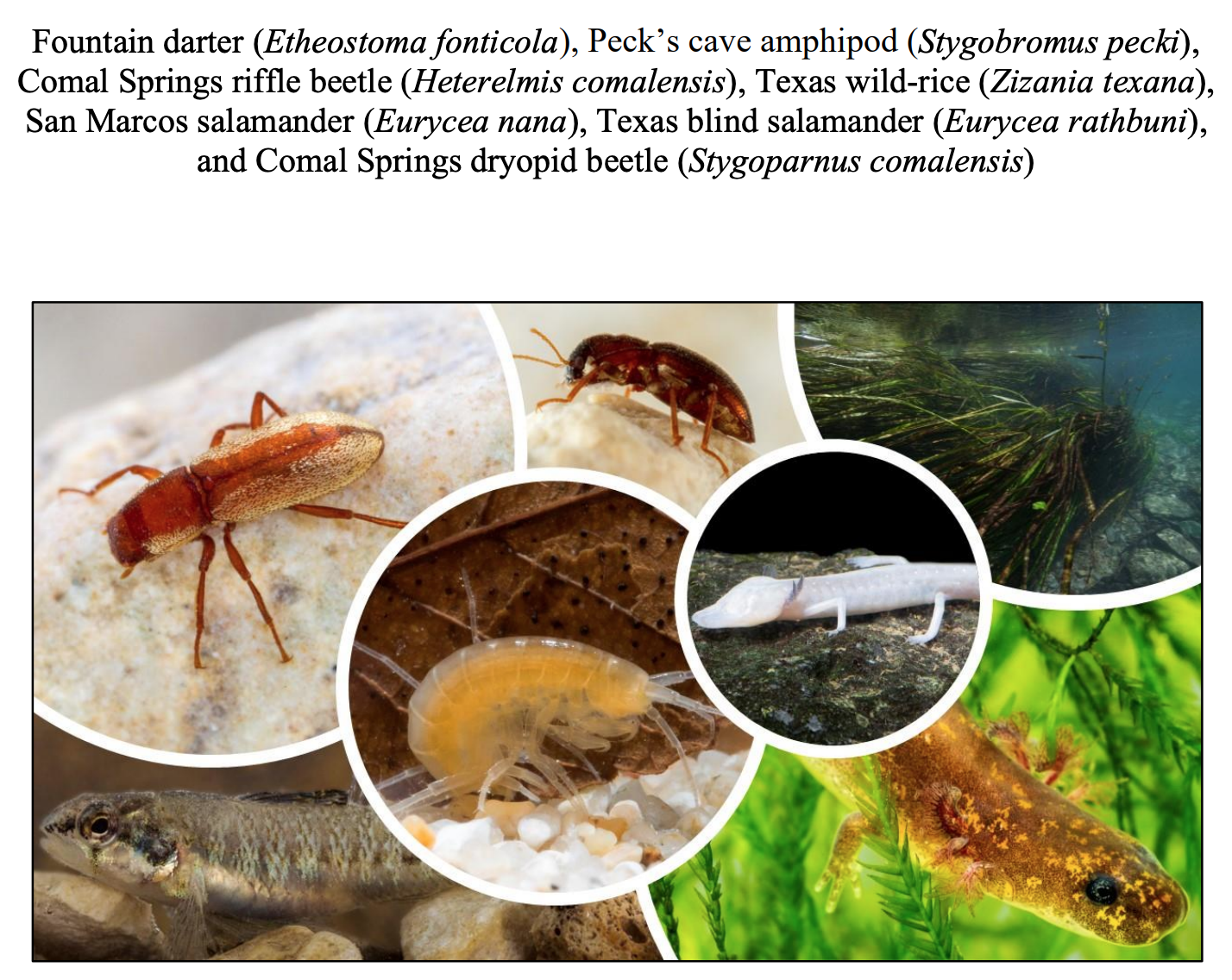
Six animals and one plant depend on healthy underground waters of the Edwards Aquifer of central Texas.

Documents that are published in advance of action decisions include environmental impact statements and formal biological opinions. Those that pertain to lands that include critical habitat designations provide the grounds for developing site-specific restrictions or requirements for mitigating impacts on listed species. The Fish and Wildlife Service (FWS) maintains a webpage that lists and links to all "Section 7 Consultation Issued Biological Opinions," with each identified by the agency required to consult with the FWS in utilizing the best available science and other data prior to making an action decision within their purview. "Critical habitat reports" are also listed, by species and agency, on the same "ECOS Environmental Conservation Online System."

As of April 2026, the Biological Opinions webpage lists 4,736 entries. Some of those biological opinions and reports aggregate a number of species into a single document to support interagency cooperation and the development or updating of official recovery plans. One example is a 2024 biological background document that pertains to seven listed species dependent on a cave and springs system in central Texas: "Species Biological Report for Southern Edwards Aquifer Springs and Associated Aquatic Ecosystems."

=== International cooperation ===
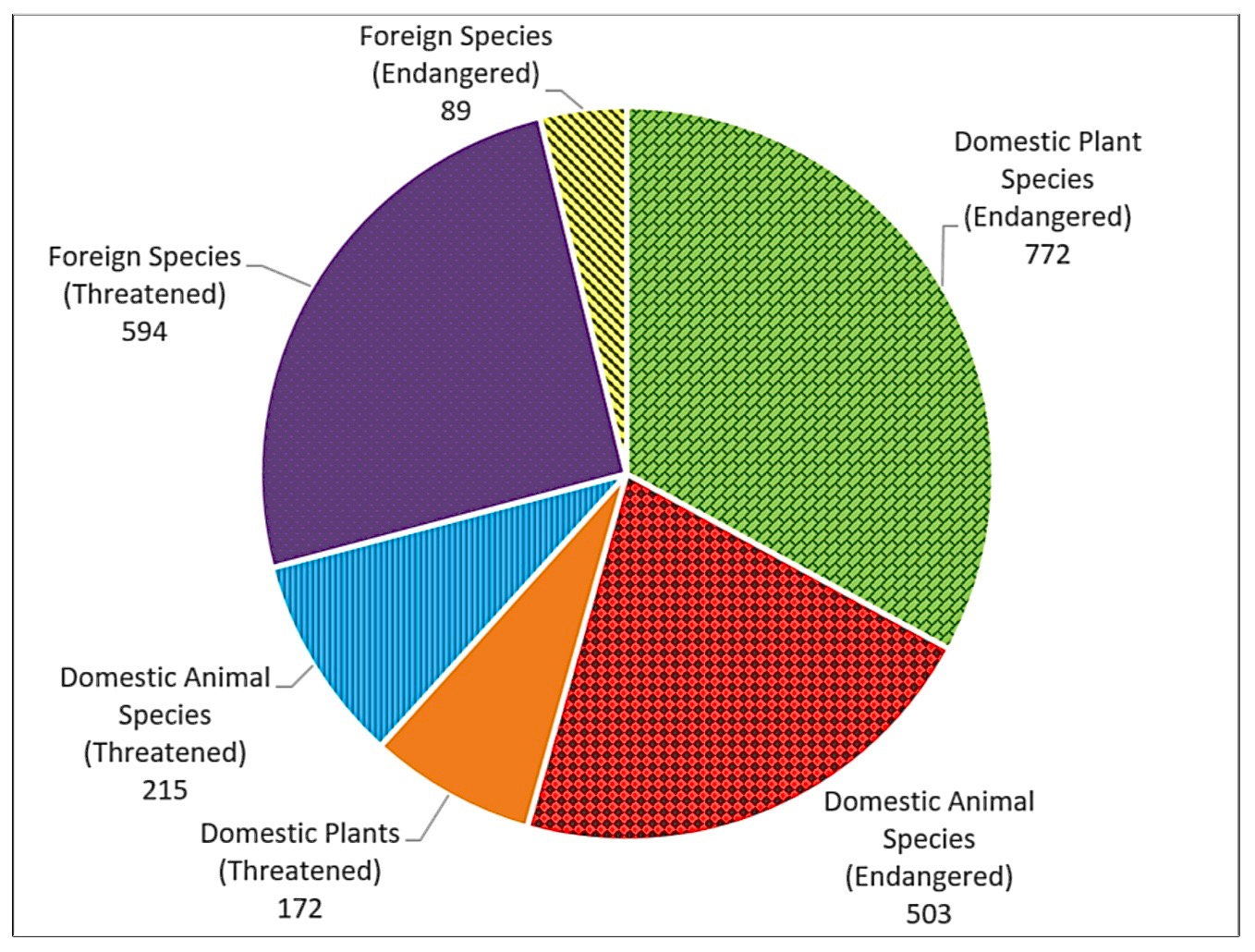
International and domestic plants and animals protected under the Endangered Species Act as of 2020.

The central feature of the Act is listing, protecting, and recovering domestic species of animals and plants that are threatened or endangered. Additionally, Section 8 of the Act directs that international treaties and conventions pertaining to imperiled species are also to be implemented.

The same year that the U.S. endangered species legislation was being shaped, an international effort to enact something similar was underway. The Convention on International Trade in Endangered Species of Wild Fauna and Flora, abbreviated as CITES, is a multilateral treaty to protect the plants and animals that are largely imperiled by international trade. It was drafted as a result of a resolution adopted in 1963 at a meeting of members of the International Union for Conservation of Nature (IUCN). The convention was opened for signature in 1973 and CITES entered into force in July 1975. As of 2025, roughly 6,610 species of animals and 34,310 species of plants are protected internationally against over-exploitation.

In 1992, the Supreme Court ruled that citizens do not have standing to sue the federal government for providing funds to other countries for uses that may harm foreign species that are listed as endangered. The case name is Lujan v. Defenders of Wildlife.

=== Citizens can petition for listing species ===
A review of the Act published in 2009 recounted the unavoidable problems that arose from granting opportunities even for citizens to submit petitions for species listing:

Soon after the Endangered Species Act was enacted, Congress recognized that at any given time there were likely to be more species potentially eligible for listing than the Service could address through the rule-making process. As a result, Congress in 1979 directed the Service to develop a prioritization system that would enable it to determine which of the potentially eligible species should be considered first. The Service responded with listing priority guidance that established a hierarchy of priorities based first on the magnitude of threat, then upon its imminence, and finally upon taxonomic distinctiveness (with monotypic genera ranked ahead of other species, and full species ranked ahead of subspecies).

Requirements that listing decisions be made based on scientific evidence and considerations, coupled with an inability of the agencies to expand and contract staffing based on shifts in the volume of outstanding petitions, induced Congress in 1982 to amend the Act by establishing deadlines for agency decisions. As of 2023, those deadlines still nominally apply, but in practice it is rare for a petitioner to approach the judicial system to force a decision before the agency is able to finish the job on its own timetable.

== Challenges and controversies ==
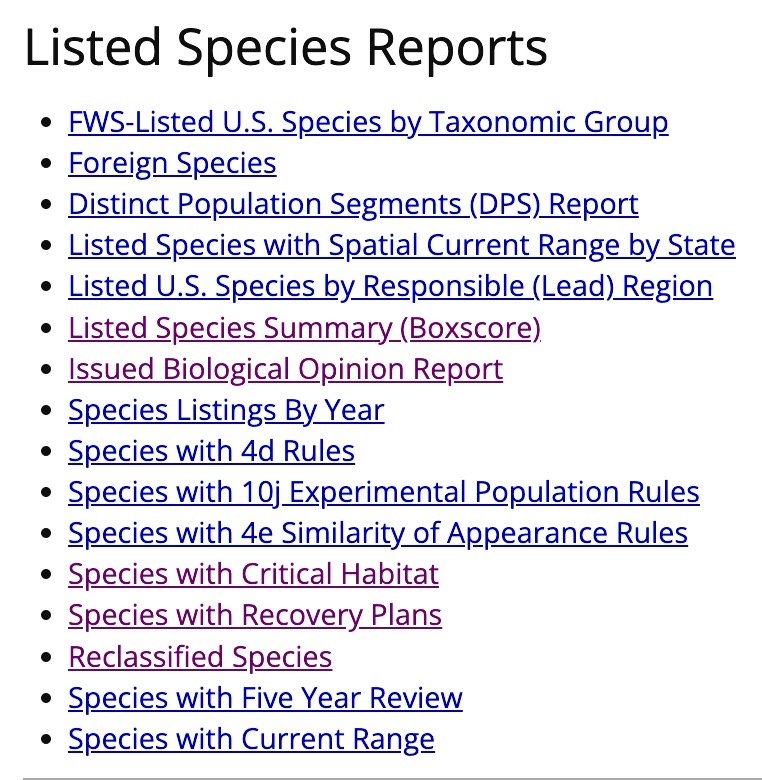
The U.S. Fish and Wildlife Service provides online lists that link to a range of reports it depends on for implementing the Endangered Species Act of 1973.

The Endangered Species Act of 1973 (ESA) is regarded as "one of the most powerful and controversial environmental laws in the United States." In 2023, with the Act achieving its 50th anniversary, journalists were prompted to report on the Act's outcomes and controversies. Congressional overturning of several recent listings and ability to hamper implementation by restricting agency funding were among the points mentioned by some media. A foundation associated with the Western Caucus of U.S. senators and representatives issued a 116-page report in 2023 titled "The Endangered Species Act at 50", with a subtitle expressing its primary criticism that "a record of falsified recoveries underscores a lack of scientific integrity in the federal program." Using the same title but reaching an opposite conclusion, the Center for Biological Diversity focused on how many species were prevented from going extinct in the past half century.

Among the faculty expressing 50th-anniversary views in a University of Pennsylvania report, one drew attention to an underlying shift in national worldviews during the past half-century: The Act "reflects the confidence of mid-20th century liberal politics that any problem can be fixed with legislation based on scientific data," yet pragmatic solutions that require flexibility have been hindered and polarization has become intense. An academic review paper in 2008 reported that the Act had become "a social, legal, and political battleground" and that "the scientific question of whether the ESA works effectively to protect species remains open." Indeed, endless litigation has become a defining feature of ESA implementation.

Specific challenges and long-term controversies are summarized in this multi-part section. Support for learning and evaluating the history of ESA implementation is an online system maintained by the federal government whereby a great variety of reports published during the five decades of endangered species implementation can be accessed. The numbers and complexity of those documents are the focus of the fourth topical section included below. For now, the list shown here is just one section of the gateway webpage for accessing reports by species, by region, and by other factors. "ECOS: Environmental Conservation Online System" is the name of the governmental website, and the gateway page is ECOS Species Reports. All the decisions and reports and supplementary materials pertaining to implementation of the Act are posted by the U.S. Fish and Wildlife Service through that system.

=== Context of state-level endangered species programs ===
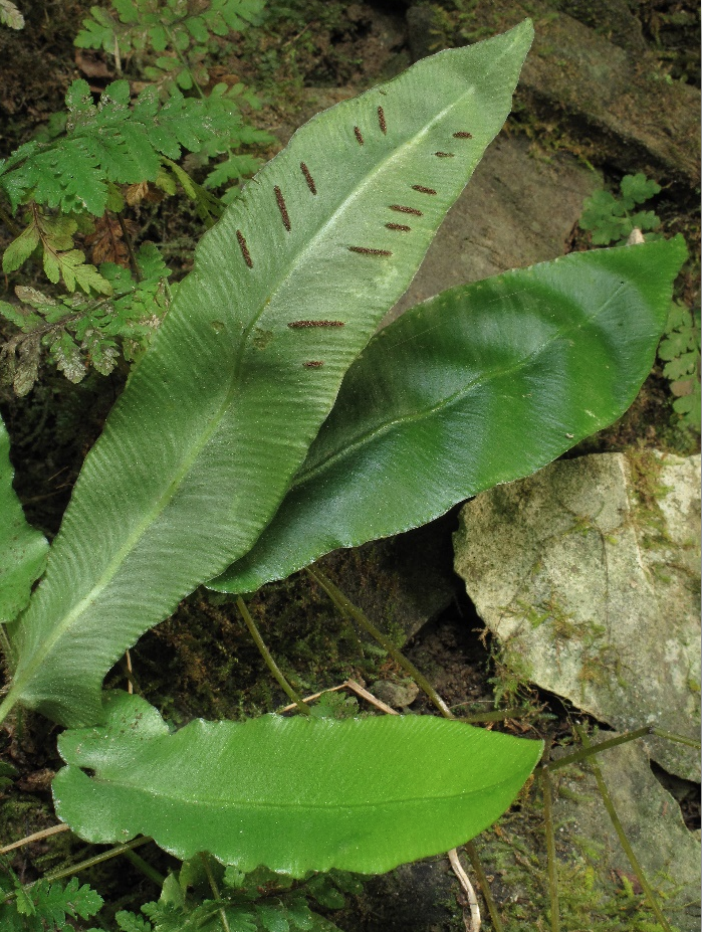
The American variety of Hart's-tongue Fern was listed as "threatened" in 1989.

Because the federal Act entail interactions with state programs, it is important to note state jurisdiction. A report prepared by the Congressional Research Service (CRS) and periodically updated states:

Section 6 of the ESA requires the Secretary to cooperate with the states to the maximum extent practicable in conserving federally protected species. FWS and courts have recognized the states' "key role" in regulating wildlife and catalyzing conservation efforts by landowners and communities on private land.

The report also noted that the 1988 amendments to the Act established the Cooperative Endangered Species Fund, which is "to provide funding for state grants, including land acquisition and planning assistance." In 2000 Congress initiated the State and Tribal Wildlife Grants program, portions of which have been used to assist recovery of federally listed species and to install projects that could preclude the need to list new species.

A 2025 CRS report is titled "The Role of the States Under the Endangered Species Act (ESA)." A 2024 report commissioned by The National Caucus of Environmental Legislators is titled "A Natural Legacy for the Future: State Laws for Endangered and Threatened Species." Both difficulties and successes in state-level actions and across-state cooperation are highlighted in this 179 page report. For example, downlisting of the Chiricahua leopard frog from endangered to threatened is attributed to state-level efforts by Arizona and New Mexico. The need for a federal listing of the Mardon skipper butterfly was avoided, owing to cooperative early efforts by the states of Washington, Oregon, and California.

In practice, the federal-state relationship has not always been congenial; some elected officials have called for devolving endangered species management to the states. An overall federal policy for collaboration, however, is not achievable because the kinds and scale of species-protective laws, regulations, and implementation priorities vary enormously among the states.

Examples of state-level diversity are that (1) only 18 of the 50 states automatically include in their own lists all animals and plants listed by the federal Act that are present in their state; (2) 17 states offer no protection for any plants; and (3) West Virginia and Wyoming have no statutory support for protecting even animals threatened with extinction. As well, only California and Oregon authorize citizens to petition for state-level listings, and distinctions prevail in matters concerning critical habitat designations and the degree to which species protections can impinge on land use choices by private owners.

Nothing prevents a state from issuing stricter regulations for a federal listed species within its boundaries. A 2018 survey of state laws found that Illinois, Massachusetts, and Wisconsin "even go beyond the ESA in their protective measures."

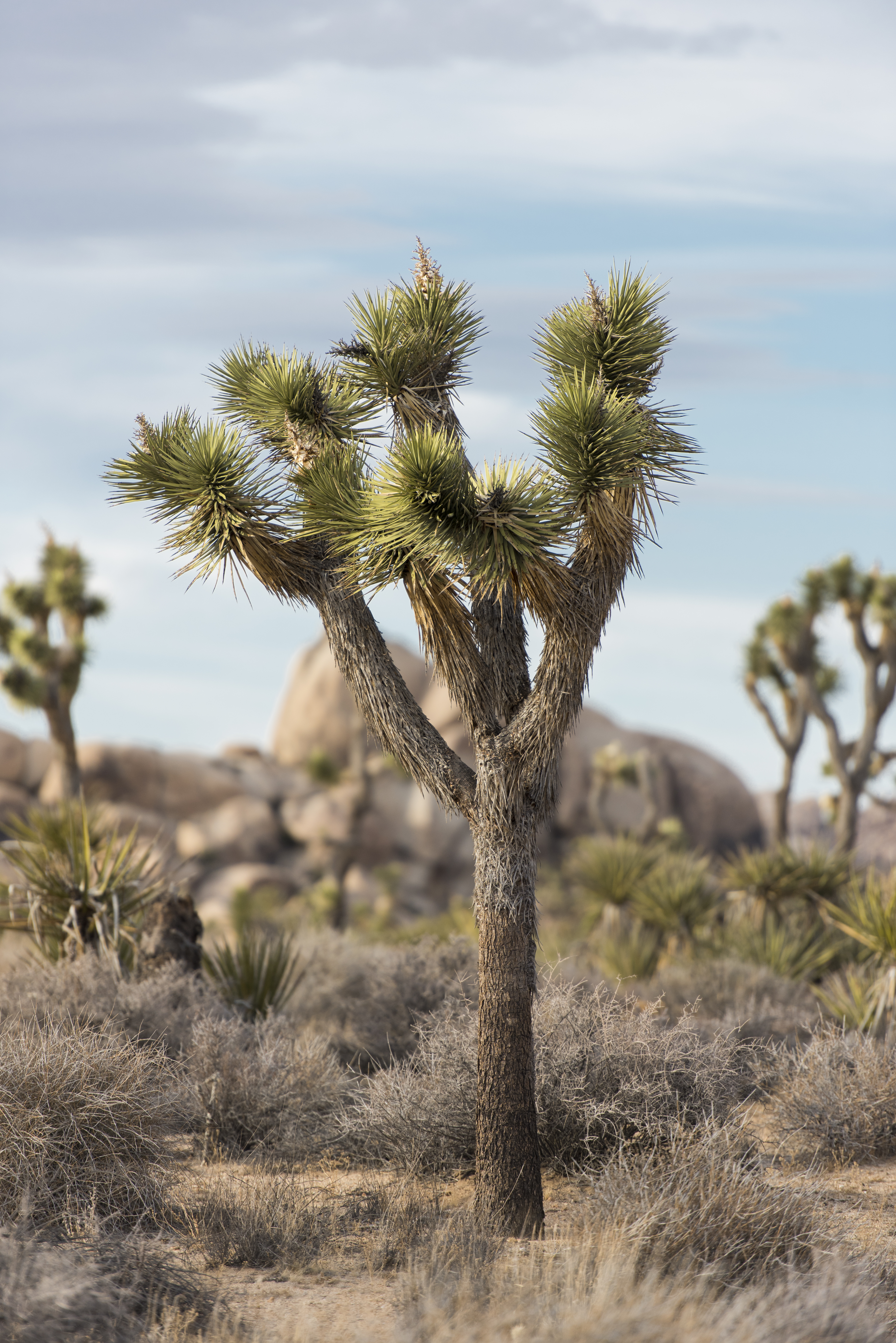
Yucca brevifolia in Joshua Tree National Park

An example of federal-state tensions occurred in California in July 2023. It was then that California enacted its own "Western Joshua Tree Conservation Act." This halted all sales of the western species of Yucca brevifolia, while instituting a permit process for any proposed removal, harm, or trimming of the species on private lands. The legislature itself chose to pass this law after the federal agency had formally decided against listing on two occasions: August 2019 and March 2023. The second decision had been forced by a 2021 court remand of the 2019 decision, and was based on a "Species Status Assessment Report" (173 pages) that had been published by the agency the prior month.

An important distinction of California's 2023 Joshua Tree statute is that it did not confer even state-level listing of this plant as threatened or endangered. Instead, a highly collaborative "Western Joshua Tree Conservation Plan" would be established and implemented (the draft was published December 2024). This would pre-empt the need for California's state-level Fish and Game Commission to decide upon an already pending listing petition in accordance with the California Endangered Species Act (CESA). The draft plan states "The Conservation Plan identifies management actions that are intended to conserve western Joshua tree and its habitat such that listing under CESA will not be necessary."

Despite the State of California's initiative, a national environmental organization (WildEarth Guardians), went to the federal court system again. In May 2025, the court ruled in their behalf. As reported in a news article,

When deciding whether the Joshua tree should be considered threatened or endangered for the "foreseeable future," the U.S. Fish and Wildlife Service only considered the future through 2069. The court ruling determined that the agency's definition of the foreseeable future was "arbitrary and capricious," and that the agency "did not use best available science regarding the threat of climate change," among other findings.

A 2018 research law paper presented the importance of state-level jurisdiction and collaboration in this way:

The Endangered Species Act (ESA) may well be the most contentious of the federal environmental statutes. It certainly is the most controversial of the conservation laws outside the purview of the United States Environmental Protection Agency (EPA). Yet, in congressional hearing after congressional hearing, one consensus rises above the rancor. All parties agree that states should play a greater role in preventing extinctions.

In October 2025, the State of California once again took actions to supersede federal ESA implementation. A new law was enacted and signed that enabled the state agency to quickly designate a plant or animal as a "provisional candidate species" for state protection if a federal action or regulatory change "could result in a decrease in endangered or threatened species protections by the federal government". That same month, the California Department of Fish and Wildlife euthanized four federally endangered wolves that had recently established in a cattle ranching part of the state. The agency explained that a small wolf pack had become "so reliant on cattle at an unprecedented level, and we could not break the cycle, which ultimately is not good for the long-term recovery of wolves or for people."

=== Executive, legislative, and judicial entanglements ===
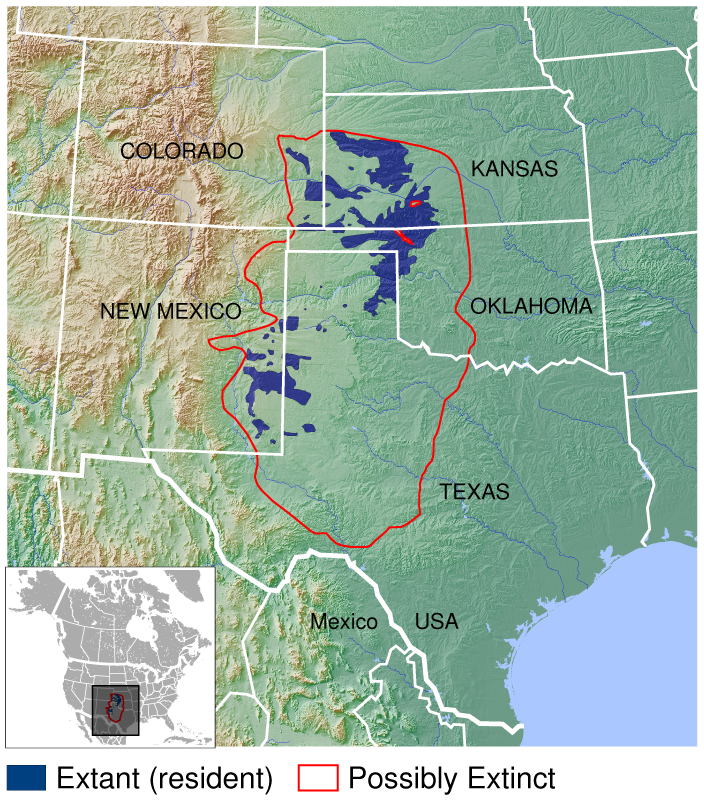
Lesser Prairie-chicken range

The petitioning, listing, and recovery planning stages prescribed in the Act have a history not only of contentiousness but of delays and setbacks owing to all three branches of the federal government sometimes becoming involved. This is especially the case when a federal listing would apply to an animal whose widely dispersed populations are declining over a vast landscape. Potential listing of the Lesser prairie-chicken is one such example.

In 1995 the Center for Biological Diversity, along with other conservation groups, petitioned for listing the lesser prairie-chicken. Agency recognition of the bird as a "candidate species" in 1998 deferred formal review while the agency worked its way through a backlog of previous petitions. In an effort to achieve habitat improvement agreements with state and private landowners prior to (and possibly thereby precluding) a listing decision, a "voluntary prelisting conservation program" was launched in 2010 — not by the U.S. Department of Interior (which includes the Fish and Wildlife Service), but by the U.S. Department of Agriculture. This government-led project was unusual for an at-risk species in that it was launched with the expressed intent to promote the long-term sustainability of ranching operations while improving the population and occupied territory of the lesser prairie-chicken. Conservation groups were keen on collaborative agreements not only for the wellbeing of this grassland bird but because of its ecological role as an umbrella species. Protecting the habitat needs of an umbrella species thereby also protects the habitat of dozens of other at-risk species.

That project did not advance well enough to preclude a listing petition in 2012, which resulted in a formal listing as "threatened" in 2014. This action was overturned by the courts in 2015, when it was challenged by business interests associated with oil and gas extraction. Conservation groups resumed petitioning for listing of the species, with the executive branch repeatedly deferring a decision until 2022. It was then that a listing was finalized that classified the southern population as endangered and the northern population as threatened. However, in 2023 Congress passed a bill that negated the listing, which was promptly vetoed by President Biden. In 2025, a federal court in Texas ruled in favor of a case filed by the State of Texas and several petroleum companies that pointed to problems in the 2022 listing decision. The Trump Administration did not defend against the lawsuit and even requested the court to overturn the listing rule. As summarized by the Sierra Club, "The court denied intervention by environmental groups who sought to defend the rule or prevent its vacatur, which meant no party in the lawsuit objected to the Fish and Wildlife Service's about face or acted to protect the species." February 2026 a regulatory posting delisted both the northern and southern populations.

In sum, from 1998 to early 2026, two executive agencies of the federal government, two judicial actions, and one attempt by Congress to overturn a listing decision all played roles in how the Endangered Species Act would be applied to the conservation of the Lesser prairie-chicken. An even more complicated example is the gray wolf, as presented in a 2020 report by the Congressional Research Service subtitled, "A Case Study in Listing and Delisting Challenges." Details of this report appear in a delisting section later on this page.

=== Disputes arising from science ===
The ESA, as amended, specifies the use of science in two distinct areas of decision-making. First, determinations whether to list (and downlist or delist) species must be made "solely" on the basis of science, without consideration of how a listing decision might adversely affect other national or regional priorities. Second, all agency decisions on managing species that are already listed must be made using "the best available science." Together, these two mandates have generated considerable discord and lawsuits on a variety of agency decisions.

To begin, the statute requires that agency decisions on listings must not be influenced by political, corporate, or citizen concerns that such listings could impinge on access to natural resources on public lands or how private landowners choose to manage their own properties. Rather, listings are to be based "solely" on the science. But even peer-reviewed science publications can be at odds, thus offering grounds for opposing parties to each present rational arguments that their position is more in line with the science than that of their opponents.

Additional points of contention arise when "the best available science" is clearly deficient. In these circumstances even the Information Quality Act guidelines issued by the federal Office of Management and Budget, along with the scientific integrity policies of the implementing agencies, may offer little support for resolving debates and thus preventing lawsuits. If staff time is already overwhelmed by existing legal requirements for decision-making and if the budget lacks capacity for hiring research by contractors, decisions will have to be made despite even large unknowns in the data and conclusions of science. Parties who strongly disagree with the agency decision may then utilize the Administrative Procedure Act to contest the outcome in court, if they can construct a good case that established agency norms for decision-making were violated. Overturn of the Chevron deference by the U.S. Supreme Court in 2024 may have amplified opportunities for judicial scrutiny of agency decisions to the point that even "the best available science" aspects can be argued in court.

=== Citizen rights to petition and sue ===
Among the most polarizing provisions in the Act are the rights awarded to citizens (and their interest groups) to compel the agency to make listing decisions, to specify "critical habitat", and then to challenge in court such decisions. To begin, citizens are authorized to submit petitions proposing the listing of new species and to have those petitions officially responded to in accordance with deadlines set forth in the Act, as amended. Decisions to list (or not to list), along with the degree of protection granted (endangered or threatened), are then vulnerable to citizen litigation in federal courts. A 2016 report on the ESA by the Congressional Research Service wrote:

The citizen suit provisions of the ESA have been a driving force in the ESA's history and often have been used to force agencies to devote greater effort toward conserving the species in question. At least one study suggests that citizen groups drive listings of species that may be at greater risk than those proposed by FWS; the same article presented data to support the thesis that citizen proposals for listings are more likely to concern species in conflict with development. ESA citizen suits seeking to list species, or to challenge delays in listing decisions, amount to a significant number of lawsuits against FWS and NMFS.

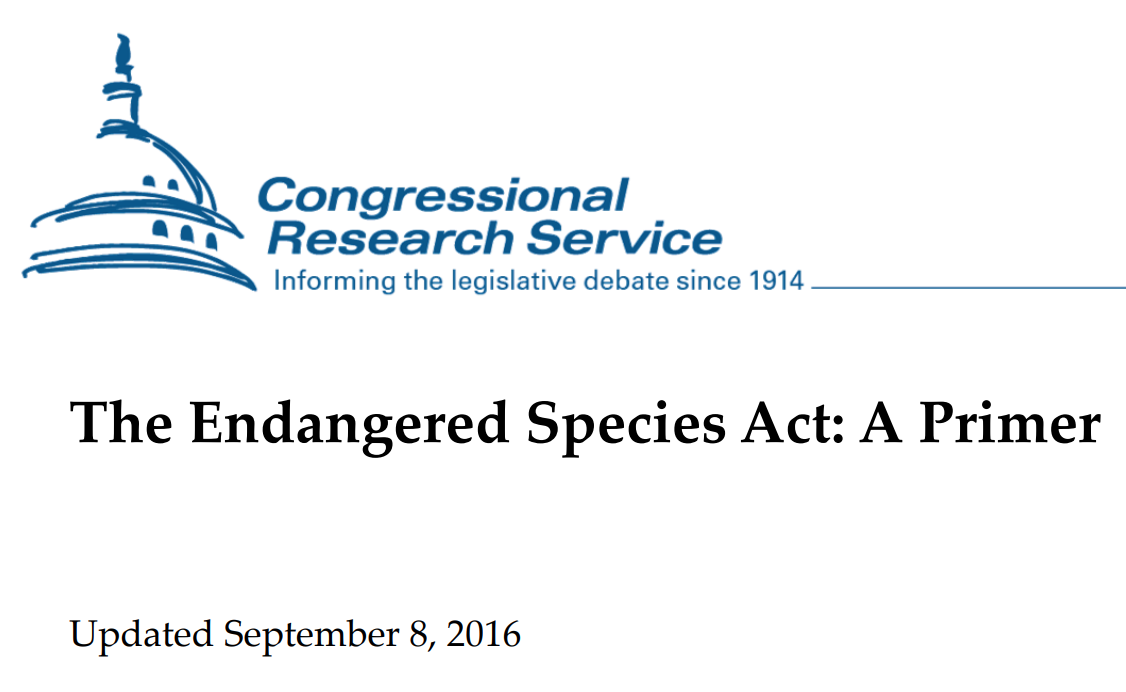
The Congressional Research Service lists and links a number of its endangered species reports.

In practice, agency decisions are sometimes challenged by biodiversity proponents who assert that "the best available science" would compel stronger listing protections. Decisions are also sometimes challenged by oppositional interest groups, notably by those grounded in business, extractive industry, or landowner rights perspectives. A review article published in 2025 on lessons learned from implementation of the ESA reports on how the "best available science" understandings have evolved through time, including examples (notably, population viability analysis) where experts continue to disagree. The 2025 review also reports that the Act itself employs language that generates dispute among experts: "In addition, agencies spent valuable resources in courtrooms defending their definitions of subjective terms like 'significant portion of range', 'historic', 'critical habitat', 'foreseeable future', and even 'species', with many conservation scientists offering expert testimony." Overturn of the Chevron deference by the U.S. Supreme Court in 2024 may have amplified opportunities for citizens pro and con to obtain judicial scrutiny of agency decisions grounded in arguable "best available science" and the unavoidably ambiguous standards written into the statute.

Citizen suits are not unique to the Endangered Species Act. A 2004 paper reported that "sixteen of the nation's principal federal environmental laws invite citizens to sue" to force agencies to perform mandatory duties.

With respect to the ESA, however, critics of citizen rights to petition for listing have charged that "most citizen-initiated listings are driven primarily by political motives, particularly to block development projects." Another argument is that "citizens initiate listing of more subspecies and populations (as opposed to full species), again out of political convenience." Environmental interest groups are themselves sometimes divided on how the petitioning right should be used. Disagreement amplified when some environmental interest groups began submitting mega-petitions. A 2020 law review article stated that:

Tensions were magnified in 2007 when the environmental group WildEarth Guardians filed two "mega-petitions" that together proposed the listing of almost seven hundred species. The legal and political battles surrounding the mega-petitions hardened positions among stakeholders and politicians, including conflicting views within the environmental community.

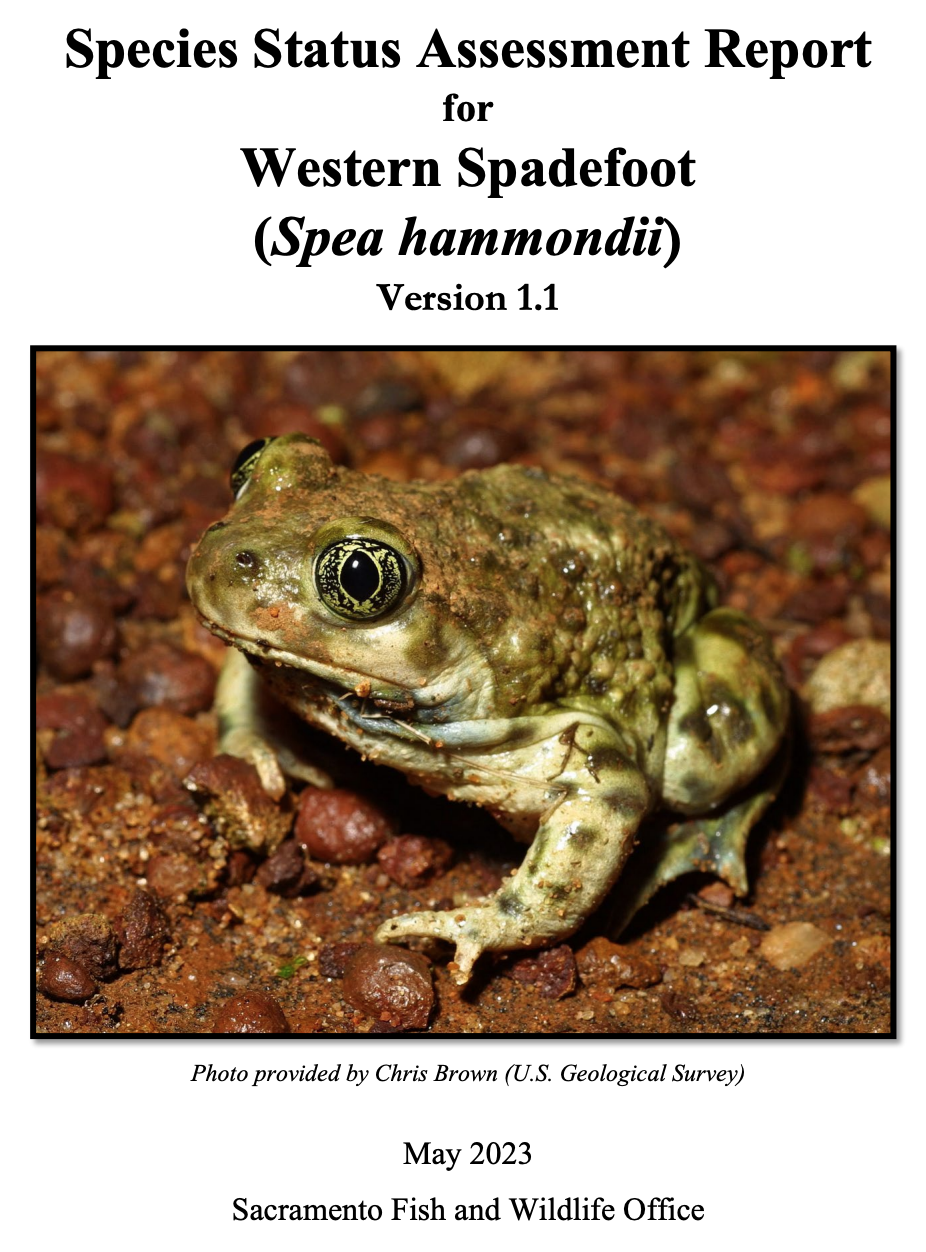
A "species status assessment" was completed 11 years after the Western spadefoot toad was among 53 amphibians and reptiles petitioned for listing.

In 2011 a "mega-settlement" was achieved by the agency, WildEarth Guardians, and another biodiversity advocate group, Center for Biological Diversity. The settlement required FWS to take action on pending petitions for 757 species over the next seven years. In exchange, the two environmental groups agreed to limit lawsuits filed against the agency so that efforts could be focused on trying to accomplish the terms of the agreement. The following year, however, the Center for Biological Diversity submitted a single petition for listing a total of 53 amphibians and reptiles spanning a range of 45 states. The petition entailed 454 pages. The list of citizen petitioners included two well-known ecological scientists: Edward O. Wilson and Thomas Lovejoy. This action provoked a written statement by the chair of the United States House Committee on Natural Resources:

While the recent petition does not directly violate the terms of the settlement, it does divert money and resources away from species recovery and disregards the spirit of the settlement by adding to the Agency's backlog of petitions. Time and again, CBD and other similar groups have undermined the goal of the ESA by litigating, obstructing, and frustrating the FWS while racking up hundreds of thousands of dollars in taxpayer-funded attorney fees that continue to feed their litigious strategies to the detriment of species and people.

Arguments in favor of retaining citizen rights to petition for new listings include: "In many cases, outside groups could serve as the only impetus for protection of biologically threatened taxa that would otherwise be ignored because they conflict with development projects and related political pressures or because they are low-profile subspecies." As well, thoroughly researched and data-rich petitions can actually assist agency staff in finding, evaluating, and including in the written decision "the best available science":

Citizen actors—including numerous scientists—have specialized knowledge about biological taxa and geographic locales. FWS is limited in its budget, staff size, and scope and is unlikely to ever contain enough expertise to identify all species most worthy of protection among the more than 100,000 plant and animal species in the United States, not including subspecies.

From a practical standpoint, citizen suits are unlikely to be launched frivolously because of the costs of attorney time, coupled with the need to obtain a win in order to benefit from court-ordered reimbursement of legal expenses. Finally, "citizen suits provide important constraints on agency discretion when environmental statutory mandates and the ideological outlook of presidential administrations diverge."

=== Examples of judicial interventions ===
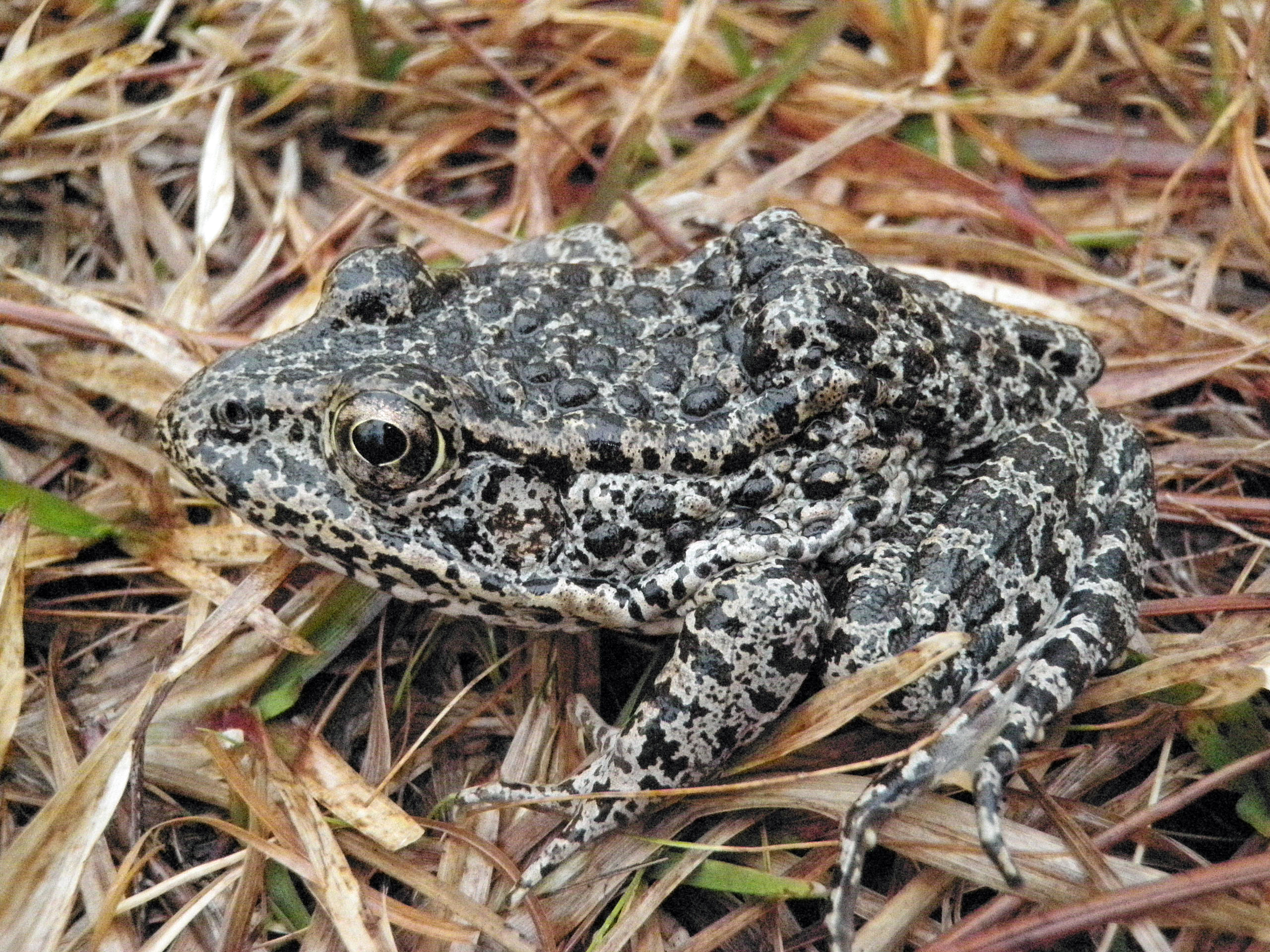
Dusky gopher frog

In Weyerhaeuser Company v. United States Fish and Wildlife Service, Edward Poitevent and his family have owned land in St. Tammany Parish, Louisiana, since the end of the Civil War. The family relies on this land for their livelihood, having signed a 90-year lease in the 1950s to preserve their property. In the 1990s, the Weyerhaeuser Company acquired this lease for timber operations. In 2012, the USFWS designated over 1,500 acres of Poitevent's property as critical habitat for the dusky gopher frog, a species that had not been sighted in Louisiana for 50 years. The nearest population of this frog was located nearly 70 miles away in Mississippi, leading many to argue that the designation was an arbitrary bureaucratic decision that restricted Poitevent's property rights and froze an estimated $34 million in economic activity. PLF has successfully represented Poitevent in his legal battle against this designation, arguing that such government actions can lead to broad implications for property rights across the country, as any piece of land could be deemed critical habitat for various species, resulting in a unanimous decision in the U.S. Supreme court affirming that the Fish and Wildlife Service exceeded its statutory authority in making the critical habitat designation.

In Center for Biological Diversity v. Marina Point Development Corp., the plaintiffs filed citizen suit actions under the Clean Water Act (CWA) and the Endangered Species Act (ESA) against a developer, claiming violations by the construction project. After the district court ruled in favor of the plaintiffs, the developer appealed. On appeal, the court found that the plaintiffs had not met the 60-day notice requirement for their CWA claims and that the ESA claims were moot due to the delisting of the bald eagle in 2007. As a result, the appellate court ordered the vacatur of both the district court's judgment and its opinion.

In State of California v. Bernhardt, Ken Klemm managed a 4,000-acre bison ranch for over two decades, focusing on bison grazing. His efforts were restricted by U.S. Fish and Wildlife Service regulations that treated species at minimal extinction risk similarly to those facing imminent danger. In 2019, the Department of Interior reformed the Endangered Species Act (ESA), reinstating a two-step protection system to alleviate burdens on landowners like Klemm. A lawsuit from 17 states and environmental groups challenged these reforms, leading Klemm to intervene. On July 5, 2022, a district court vacated the 2019 reforms without evaluating their legality. The Ninth Circuit subsequently ruled that federal regulations cannot be rescinded without judicial review, allowing the 2019 rules to remain while the agency undergoes a formal amendment process.

=== Rise in numbers and complexity of required documents ===
==== Decisions on petitions to list ====
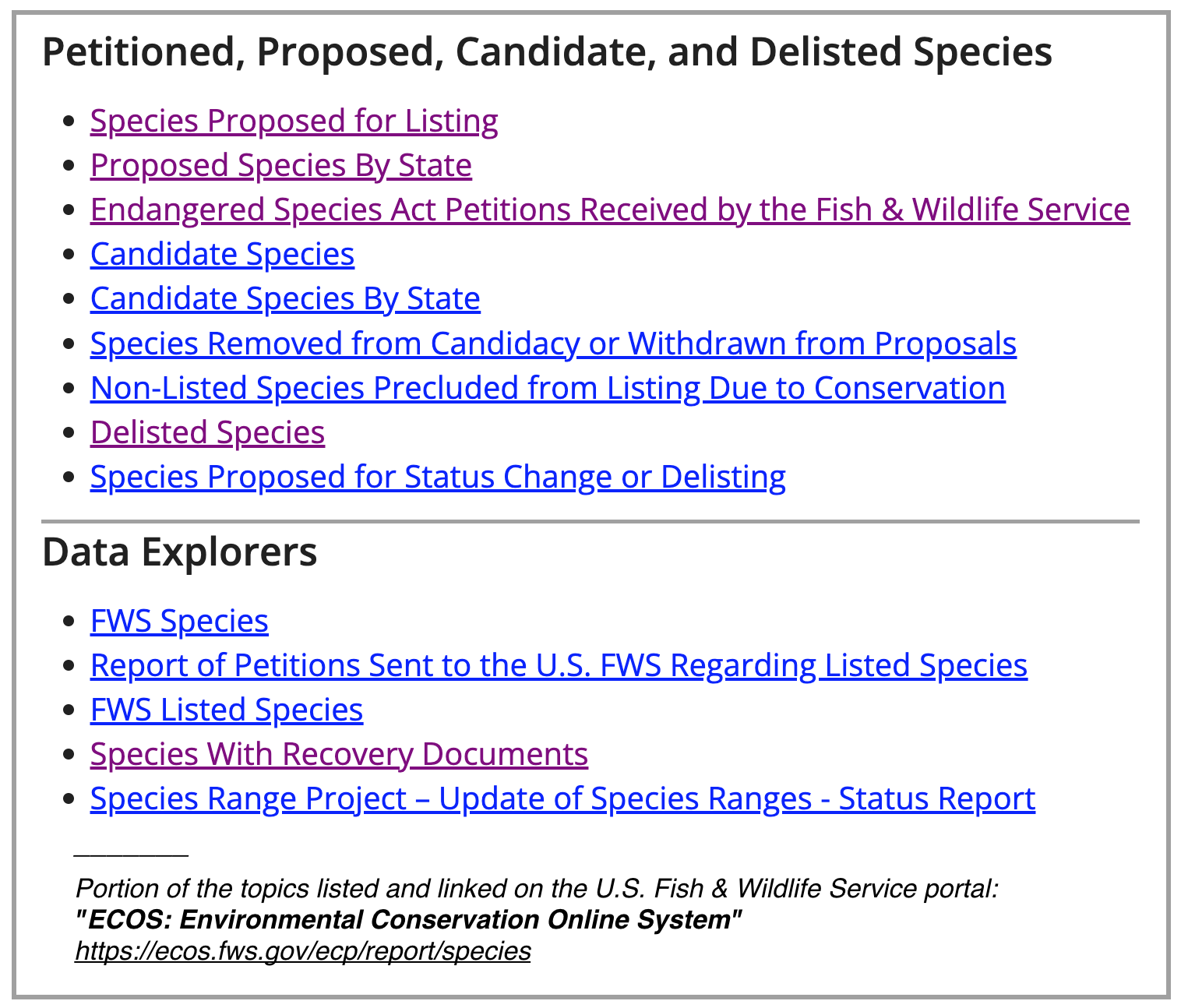
Linked document types of the U.S. Fish and Wildlife Service in making and supporting its listing decisions pursuant to the Endangered Species Act of 1973.

Citizens (including non-governmental organizations) are empowered to petition a species (or distinct population of a vertebrate species) to be designated as threatened or endangered. Decision documents (first in draft, then in final) are posted in the Federal Register. Draft decisions are to be posted for comment within two years, but in practice it often takes the agency much longer. A 2022 academic paper evaluated the wait times:

The wait-times between when a species is first petitioned for protection under the ESA and when it finally receives that protection have waxed and waned since 1992. The period with the longest median wait time (2000–2009, with a median wait-time of 9.1 years), was also the period when the greatest number of petitions were received by FWS (n = 203).

Because the statute directs the agency to use "the best available science" when evaluating a petition, no new scientific research needs to be conducted before issuing a response. Even so, staff time and resources may be substantial, partly to ensure that the resulting decision derives from a document that can allay disappointed stakeholders from going to court. Decisions on petitions have been most challenged when the Center for Biological Diversity or WildEarth Guardians submit "mega-petitions" that request decisions on scores of species at the same time. Failure to meet the regulatory deadlines could subject the agency to judicial review. Only Congress can forestall those kinds of lawsuits. Thus, in 2011 the Fish and Wildlife Service itself requested Congress to impose a cap on the portion of the agency's budget that could be spent responding to petitions.

==== Recovery plans, critical habitat, and agency consultation ====
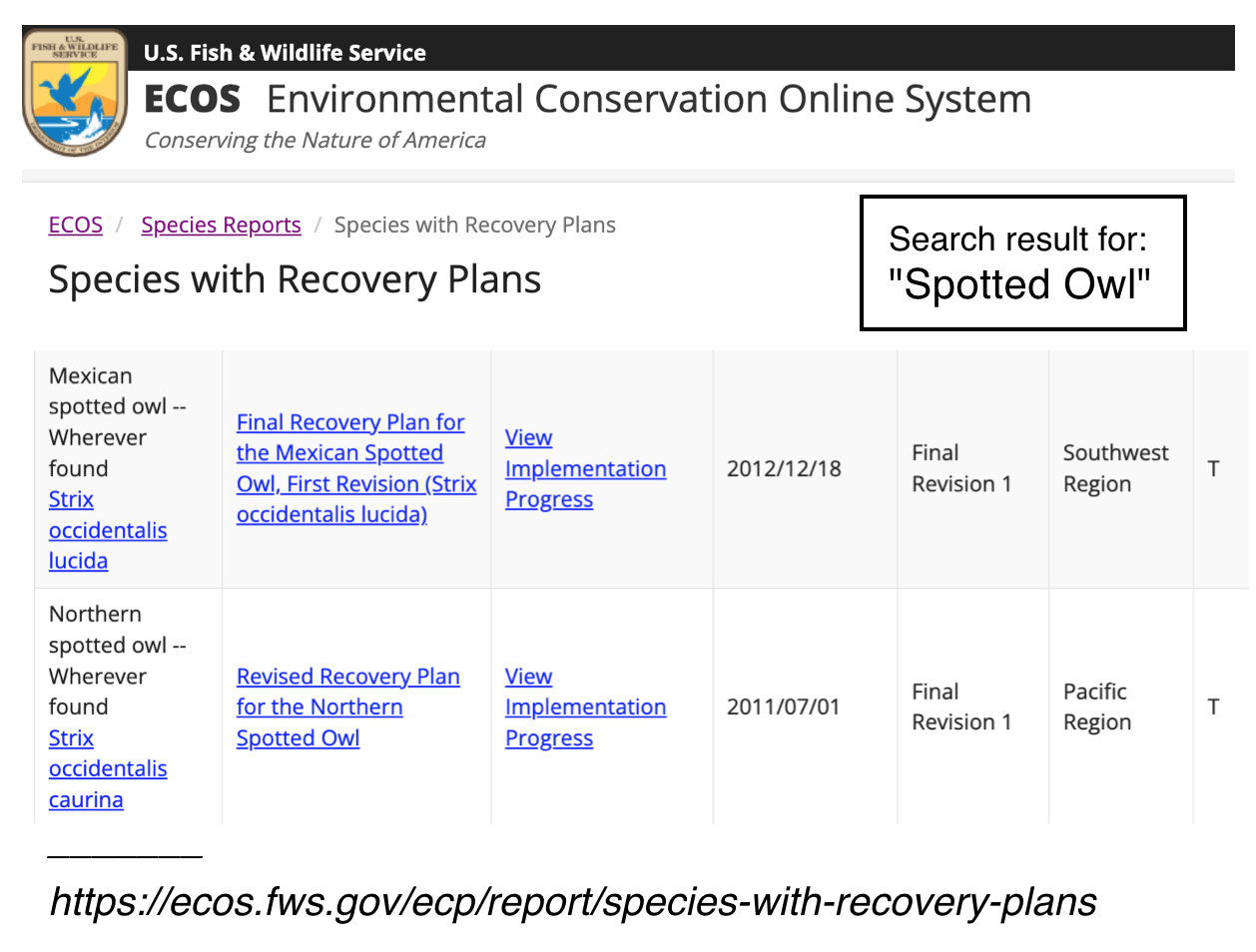
The ECOS system provides online access to all species recovery plans and "implementation progress" reports where available.

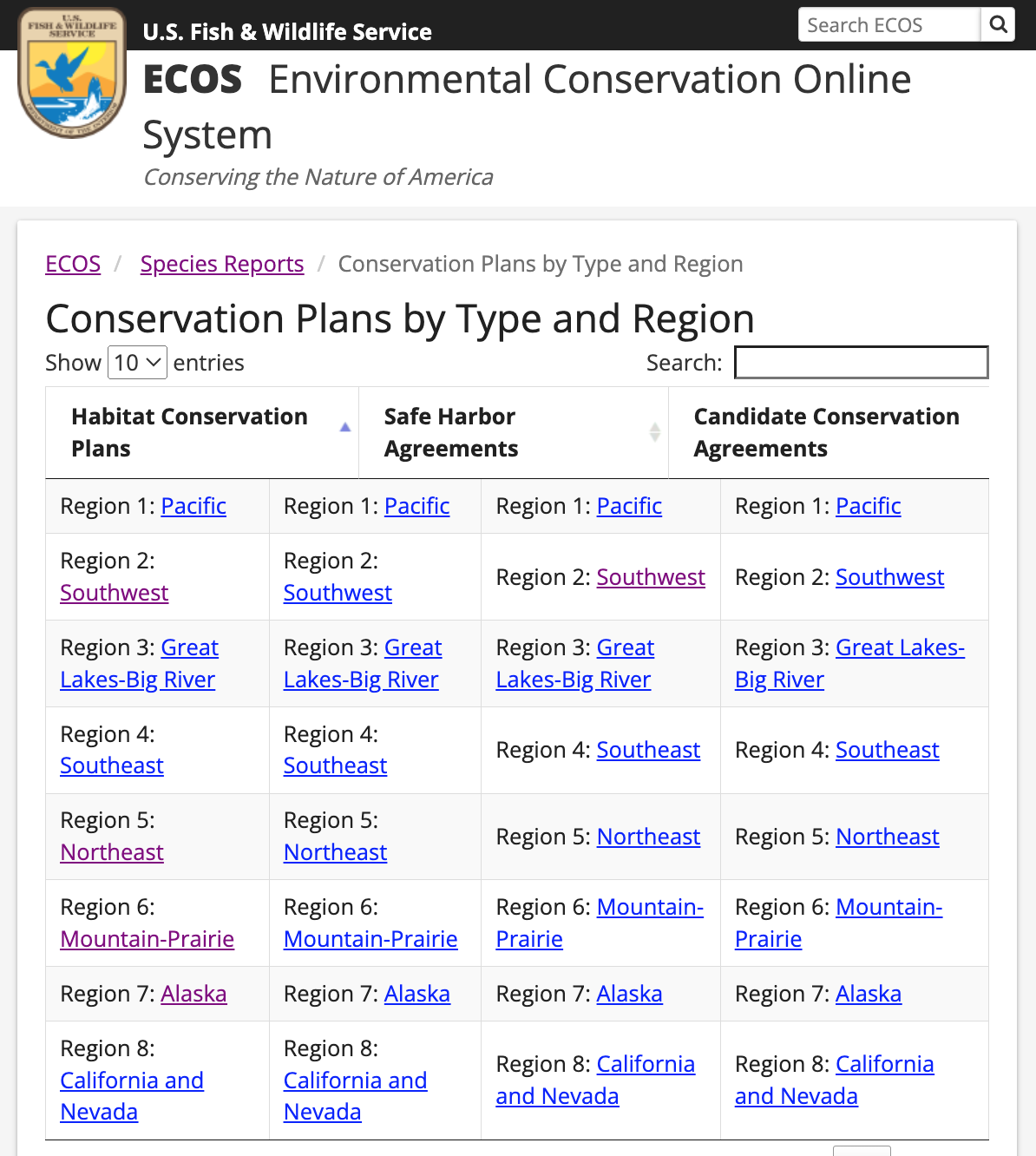
Conservation plans approved by the U.S. Fish and Wildlife Service are used to advise other governmental agencies with lands or permitting authorities.

A recovery plan (with or without critical habitat designations) is the major document prepared by the agency following a listing decision of threatened or endangered. Reviews of the plan, with updates if merited, are to be performed every five years. Below are the two stages of recovery plan documents, with references that link to the ECOS online portal where individual plans can be accessed:

- Recovery Plan (draft)
- Recovery Plan (final)

Critical habitat documents are accessible through the ECOS portal by this title: "USFWS Threatened & Endangered Species Active Critical Habitat Report." As of February 2025, 964 designations have been published. These are intended to assist the public in learning whether any particular acreage in the USA contains designated critical habitat where listed species and their essential habitat must not be harmed:

The statutory requirement for other federal agencies to act in ways supportive of listed species is generally referred to as "agency consultation." This is where the decision-making, documentation, and public participation becomes more complex.

The Congressional Research Service (CRS) produced (and periodically updates) a detailed online document whose purpose is to make the Act and its implementation outcomes understandable to members and staff of the U.S. Congress. Titled, "The Endangered Species Act: Overview and Implementation," the document has lengthy sections pertaining to the complexities of and distinctions between Section 7 "Interagency Consultation" and Section 10 "Exceptions". Legally required written documents that result are known as "Incidental Take Statements" (ITS), which is an outcome of Section 7 of the Act, and two documents arising from Section 10: Incidental Take Permits (ITP) and Habitat Conservation Plans (HCP). Again, the ECOS portal offers access to these official documents:

- Critical Habitat Report
- Consultation Issued Biological Opinions

A two-page version of just the "Section 7 Consultation" process, requirements, and document outcomes was published by the CRS in 2023. In it, one learns distinctions between a "biological assessment" and a "biological opinion" (BiOp). The latter may contain an "incidental take statement" (ITS) if an endangered species could experience "jeopardy" if the action moves forward. Thus, "the ITS describes the anticipated impact of any incidental take (i.e., harassing, harming, killing, or otherwise taking the species, as defined by the ESA, in the course of the otherwise legal action) and provides reasonable and prudent measures (RPMs) the Service considers necessary to minimize that impact."

Environmental Impact Statements (EIS) and subsequent permitting actions are administered by the Environmental Protection Agency, with requirements for consulting with the Fish and Wildlife Service within specified time parameters. The same holds for actions and permitting authorities of the Bureau of Land Management, Forest Service, and Army Corps of Engineers. Entities seeking development permits on federal lands may be required to develop "Habitat Conservation Plans" (HCP) that may include mitigation efforts, monitoring, and even supporting additional field science. HCP documents can be accessed individually by the development project title through the ECOS portal. For example, the "Criterion Wind Power" project has an individual page. Its permit to proceed was issued in 2014 for a duration of 21 years. Subsidiary links include two versions of the HCP, two Biological Opinions, a NEPA-EA, a NEPA-FONSI, and a "Set of Findings".

Finally, although not subject to public comment requirements via draft publication in the Federal Register, the Fish and Wildlife Service has been making the recovery plan stage less complex by creating policy-free and science-rich "Species Status Assessments" (SSA). These are posted on a dedicated ECOS portal, with summary statements later embedded into the formal, and policy-rich recovery plan documents.

=== Incentives for stopping development ===
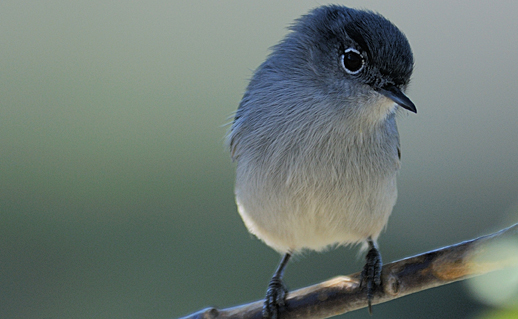
Coastal California gnatcatcher

Controversy sometimes roils when the timing of a petition to list a new species overlaps with plans for or initiation of a development project that could be impeded by such a listing. A news editorial marking the 50th anniversary of the Act suggested that "the ESA became the weapon of choice for environmental groups seeking to stop projects or tear down others. Lawsuits by the score have been filed over projects large and small, setting off ill feelings toward environmental groups." A prominent example of this dynamic was the listing of the coastal California gnatcatcher. Some observers opined that the impetus for listing was in part borne out of the species being considered a "flagship" for the coastal sage scrub ecosystem of southern California—an area subject to significant pressure for housing development.

=== Economic consequences and perverse incentives ===
Because the Act allowed species to be listed as endangered without consideration of the economic consequences, it soon became and continues to be controversial. Costs conferred on private landowners and various industries may come in the form of lost opportunity or slowing down operations to comply with the regulations put forth in the Act. Notably, in 1978 the listing of a tiny fish (snail darter) shut down for several years construction of a dam that was already underway on the Little Tennessee River. More broadly, the requirement to consult with the relevant agencies on federal projects has at times slowed operations by the oil and gas industry, including exploration or development on federal lands rich in fossil fuels.

Due to political backlash stemming from the snail darter decision, in 1978 Congress amended the ESA to be more sensitive to costs. Among other changes, the 1978 amendments clarified the process for designating critical habitat, by requiring the consideration of economic impacts when designating critical habitat and providing a mechanism for excluding critical habitat where the benefits of exclusion would outweigh the benefits of designating the area as critical habitat. The 1978 amendments also amended the Section 7 consultation process to authorize FWS and NMFS to allow projects that may affect listed species or habitat to continue if there are "reasonable and prudent alternatives" that minimize adverse impacts. These amendments to the critical habitat and Section 7 consultation processes (along with additional amendments made in 1982) were designed to offset the consequences of the cost-neutral process for the initial listing of species, and to improve flexibility in the ESA's application.

Range map of red-cockaded woodpecker

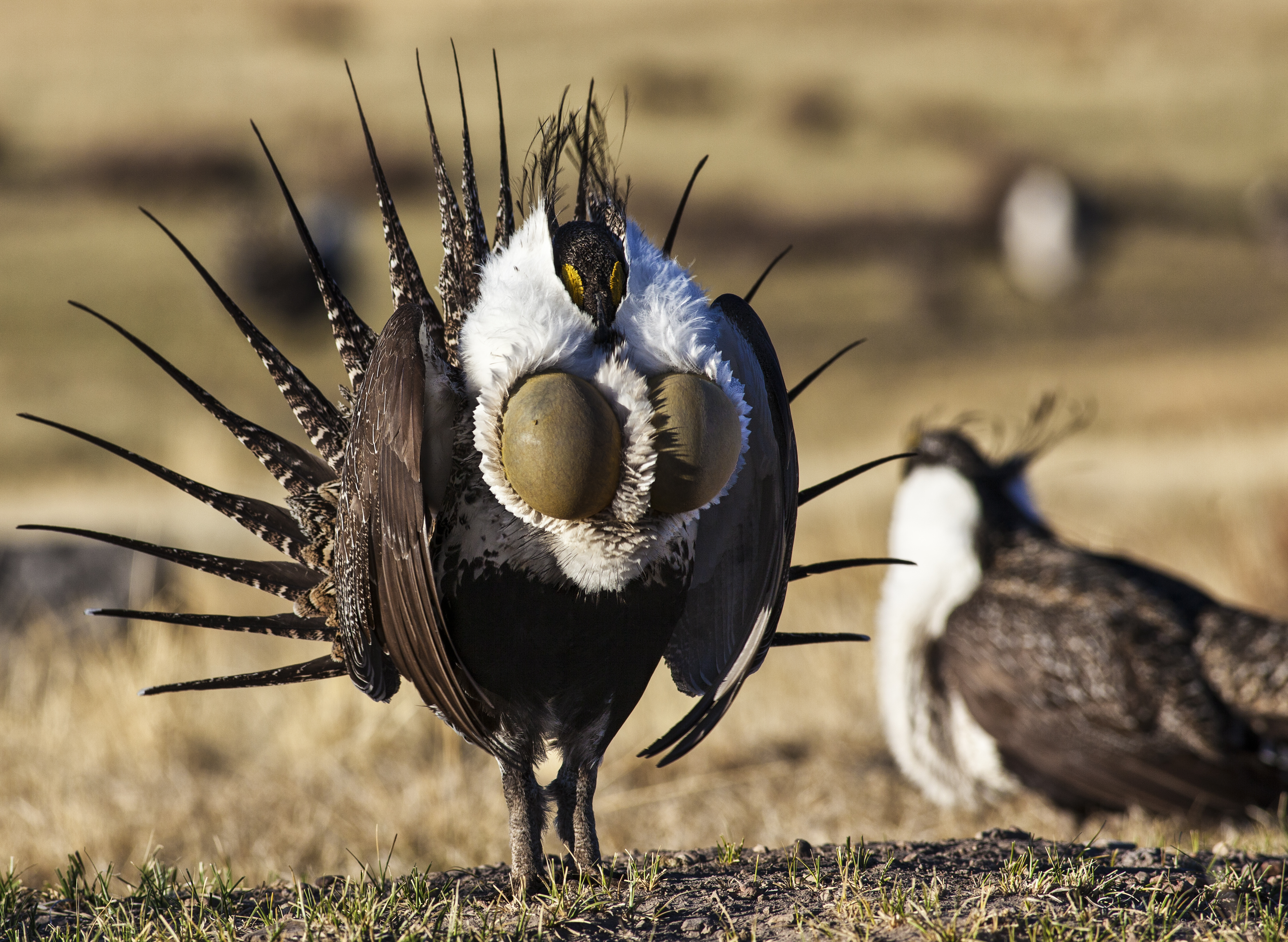
Courtship display of a male greater sage-grouse.

Notwithstanding the 1978 and 1982 amendments, one widely held opinion remains that the protections afforded to listed species curtail economic activity. In the extreme, economic consequences can induce perverse incentives by which landowners actively curtail their lands from attracting endangered species. An example in the eastern USA pertains to the endangered red-cockaded woodpecker. A 1995 study of some 1,000 privately owned forest plots within the range of the woodpecker found that when landowners observed pine growth maturing to a stage in which it might attract nesting woodpeckers, they were more likely to harvest – regardless of timber prices at the time. This is a form of intentional habitat destruction for avoiding economic consequences. By 2024, however, recovery actions had gone well enough for the federal agency to downlist the species from endangered to threatened. Downlisting was achieved in large part because of a linked pair of innovative conservation documents negotiated between landowners and the federal agency: Conservation Benefit Agreement (CBA) and Enhancement of Survival (EOS) permit.

Legislators have expressed that the ESA has been "weaponized," particularly against western states, constraining state government choices about the use of public lands. The case of the protracted dispute over the greater sage-grouse is one such example, and the spotted owl is another. In the extreme is the largely western saying pertaining to endangered animals, such as wolves: "shoot, shovel, and shut up." Rep. Don Young (Alaska), the longest-serving Republican congressman, said in 2018, "As the one person in the Congress, the only one, that voted for the Endangered Species Act, please beat me with a whip."

Some economists have stated that finding a way to reduce such perverse incentives would lead to more effective protection of endangered species. One suggestion for ending perverse incentives would be to compensate property owners for protecting endangered species, rather than having an endangered species regarded as a potential financial loss. Professor Jonathan Adler of Case Western Law School has argued that requiring compensation for the costs of ESA land-use controls could make the Act more effective, because compensation:

1. would signal the accurate cost of land-use regulation, which would in turn lower the government's "overconsumption" of such regulation,
2. would foster more efficient land development,
3. would facilitate production of more reliable species data (because landowners would be more open to having scientists conducting research on their property), and,
4. would give landowners a reason to maintain their property in species-friendly condition.

As well, while the standard to prevent jeopardy or adverse modification, under Section 7 of the ESA, applies only to federal activities (which can, however, include private activities that require a federal permit), entirely non-federal activities are subject to Section 10 of the Act. To work toward conservation solutions before perverse incentives develop, the "Conservation Without Conflict" initiative and coalition was formed in 2017, with guidance presented in a series of eight steps. Other collaborations supported by nongovernmental organizations focus on ranching and forestry stewardship initiatives.

=== The biocentric focus of listing and recovery ===
A law review article published in 2024 states, "Alone among major environmental laws, the ESA explicitly prioritizes the protection and conservation of non-human species and constrains the ability of government agencies to consider trade-offs." It was at the highest judicial level that the biocentric interpretation of the ESA was declared in 1978. The Supreme Court ruling in Tennessee Valley Authority v. Hill stated, "The plain intent of Congress in enacting this statute was to halt and reverse the trend toward species extinction, whatever the cost." In this case, the cost was the halting of dam construction underway on the Little Tennessee River, based on the listing of a small freshwater fish, the snail darter in 1975. See also 'Snail darter controversy'.

The Congressional Research Service, in a report titled "The Endangered Species Act: Overview and Implementation," surveys the language and history of this elevation of biocentrism in federal law:

The ESA expressly requires the Services to make listing determinations "solely on the basis of the best scientific and commercial data available." Congress added the word solely in the 1982 amendments to the ESA to clarify that the determination of endangered or threatened status was intended to be made without reference to its potential economic impacts. In discussing the addition of the word solely, a committee report stated the word is "intended to remove from the process of the listing or delisting of species any factor not related to the biological status of the species." The committee further stated that it "strongly believes that economic considerations have no relevance to determinations regarding the [listing] status of species," and that applying economic criteria to the listing process is prohibited by the inclusion of the word solely in the legislation.

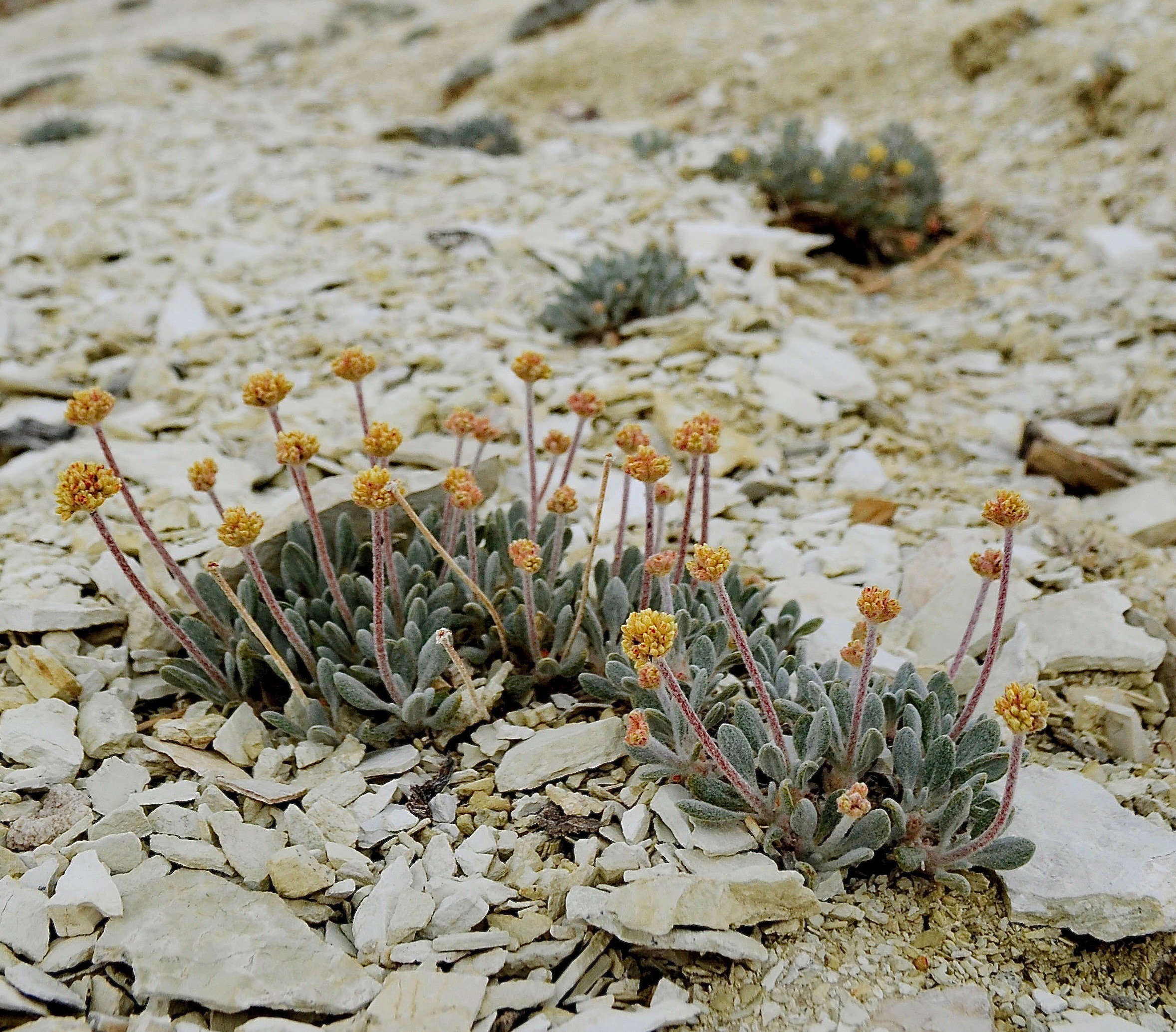
Tiehm's buckwheat in Nevada.

Ever since the Supreme Court ruling in the snail darter case, interest groups with a biocentric focus have had strong grounding for challenging agency listing decisions. As reported by the Congressional Research Service:

Citizen suits frequently have been used to compel agency action and direct agency resources under the ESA. ESA citizen suits have been used to compel the Services to list, reclassify, or delist species; challenge delays in listing decisions; oppose listing, reclassification, or delisting rules; address critical habitat designations and revisions; and challenge BiOps [Biological Opinions] and use of the Section 7 consultation process. A subset of citizen suits has addressed deadlines under the ESA (i.e., deadline suits). The Government Accountability Office reported that most deadline suits from 2005 to 2015 were related to the Services missing deadlines on petitions to list species under the ESA. The study found that most of the suits were resolved through settlements that established timelines for completing the listing process.

Another consequence of the snail darter ruling is that formal listing decisions sometimes include lengthy expositions of scientific details. This way, it is clear that the "best available science" has indeed been consulted. A highly controversial, and thus lengthy, listing decision was issued in 2022. It pertains to a small flowering plant in the desert of southwest Nevada. The published document in the Federal Register that establishes Tiehm's buckwheat as an endangered species is 33 pages long, inclusive of a "critical habitat" designation for 910 acres that was simultaneously issued. Six of the total pages are responses to each of 29 comments elicited when the required draft of the listing was published. The foundational document that established the "best available science" for making the listing decision was previously published as a "Species Status Assessment", which in itself was 80 pages long in PDF format.

=== Accommodating other national priorities ===
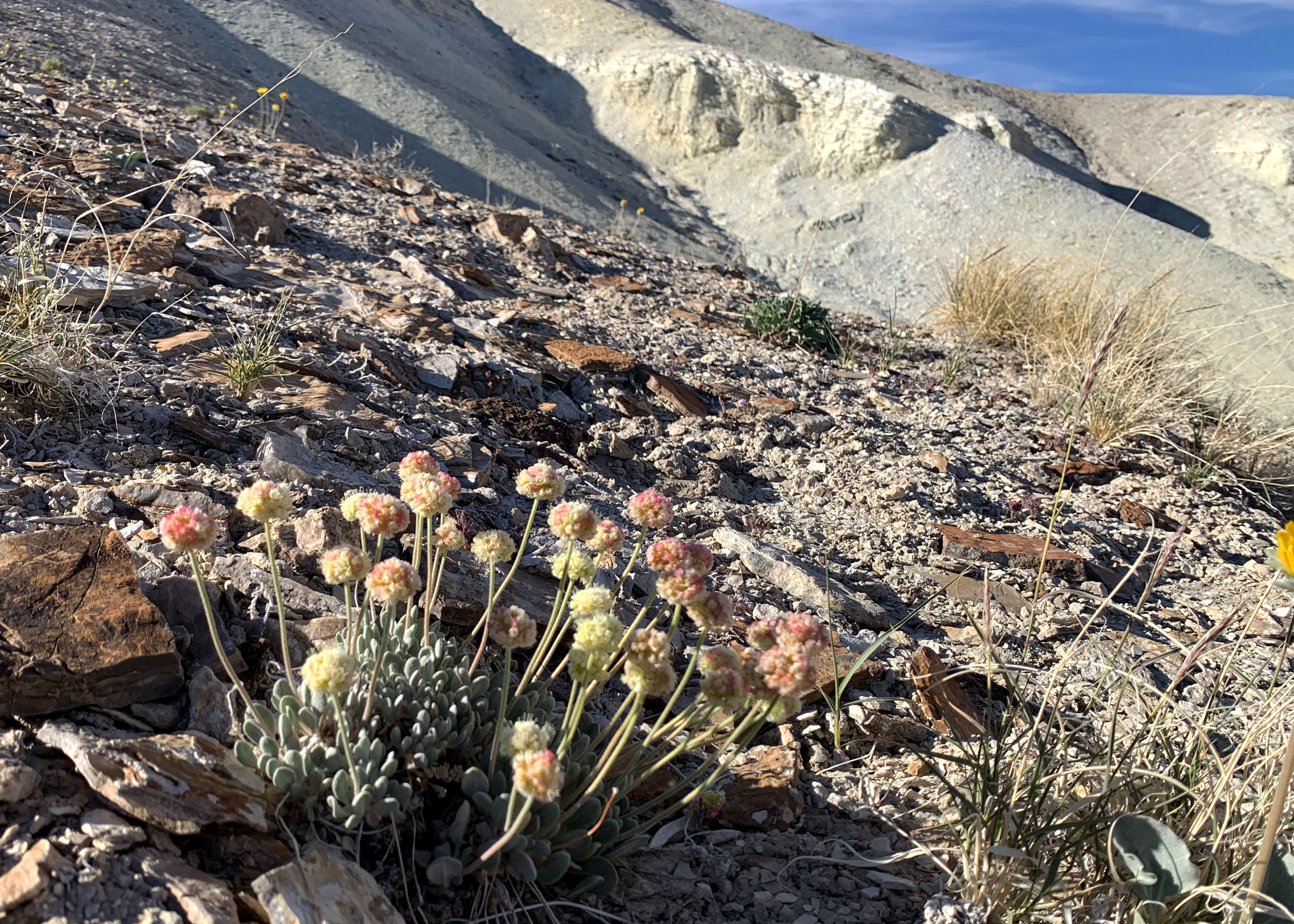
Tiehm's buckwheat in the lithium-rich landscape of southern Nevada

A recent example of competing priorities happened when the federal government was compelled to make a listing decision on a petition. In 2019 the Center for Biological Diversity petitioned to have a small flowering plant in Nevada listed as endangered. A mining project by Ioneer, an Australian company, was already preparing the site for extracting lithium and boron. Environmental interests were thus divided between those focused on species protection and those advocating for electric vehicles, which require lithium as the key component of the lightest-weight batteries.

While economic concerns and priorities are restricted from playing a role in governmental listing decisions, the 1978 amendments to the Act did make it possible for these matters to impinge on the designation of critical habitat.

Because the endangered listing decision and critical habitat specification occurred in the same document in 2022, this resulted in something unusual: Both the Center for Biological Diversity (CBD) and the mining company posted support for the decision. CBD was enthusiastic about the endangered listing. Ioneer already had developed a plan to begin mining that would not interfere with the 910 acres of critical habitat. But CBD was skeptical:

In Ioneer's latest operations plan, which covers the first phase of the mine, it proposes avoiding a tiny island of land containing 75% of the buckwheat population. The island would be surrounded by an open pit mine and tailings dumps within just 12 feet of the rare wildflowers. Ioneer falsely claims this will conserve the buckwheat.... "Ioneer's 'Buckwheat Island' scenario would spell doom for this sensitive little flower," said Donnelly. "Now that the buckwheat is protected, we'll use the full power of the Endangered Species Act to ensure Ioneer doesn't harm one hair on a buckwheat's head."

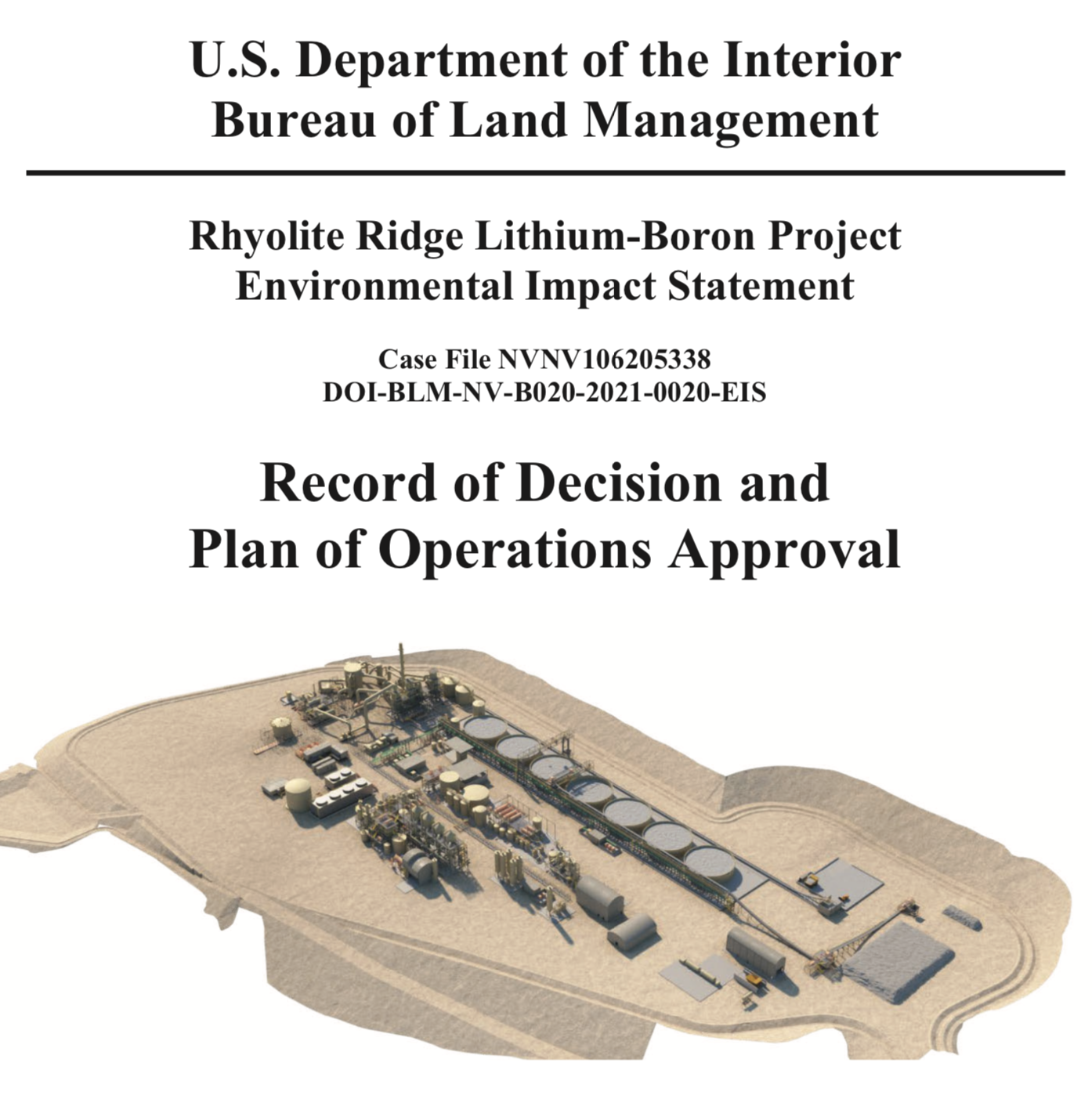
Approval for the mine, 2024

In this case, the critical habitat and its surrounds were entirely on public lands managed by the U.S. Bureau of Land Management. It thus fell to that agency, in consultation with the Fish and Wildlife Service, to make the final decisions about whether, where, and how the mine could proceed.

The Bureau granted approval October 2024. Numerous associated documents can be found on the agency's webpage for the Rhyolite Ridge Project, with all the underlying reports and documents fulfilling the requirements of the National Environmental Policy Act. The approval was preceded by a 2023 "Public Scoping Report" that was 15 pages, plus more than 100 pages of appendices.

Ioneer also has a publicly accessible website, where it publishes all the documents preceding and related to the permit decision. One of the links goes to "Ioneer's Buckwheat Protection Plan Summary: Proposed Conservation Measures for Tiehm's Buckwheat and Critical Habitat." Another page on the website describes the company's past and future conservation efforts. Two botanists have been hired to work in the greenhouse to conduct research "to develop protection measures that will ensure the plant can thrive in natural conditions, including the extremes posed by climate change."

=== Effectiveness ===
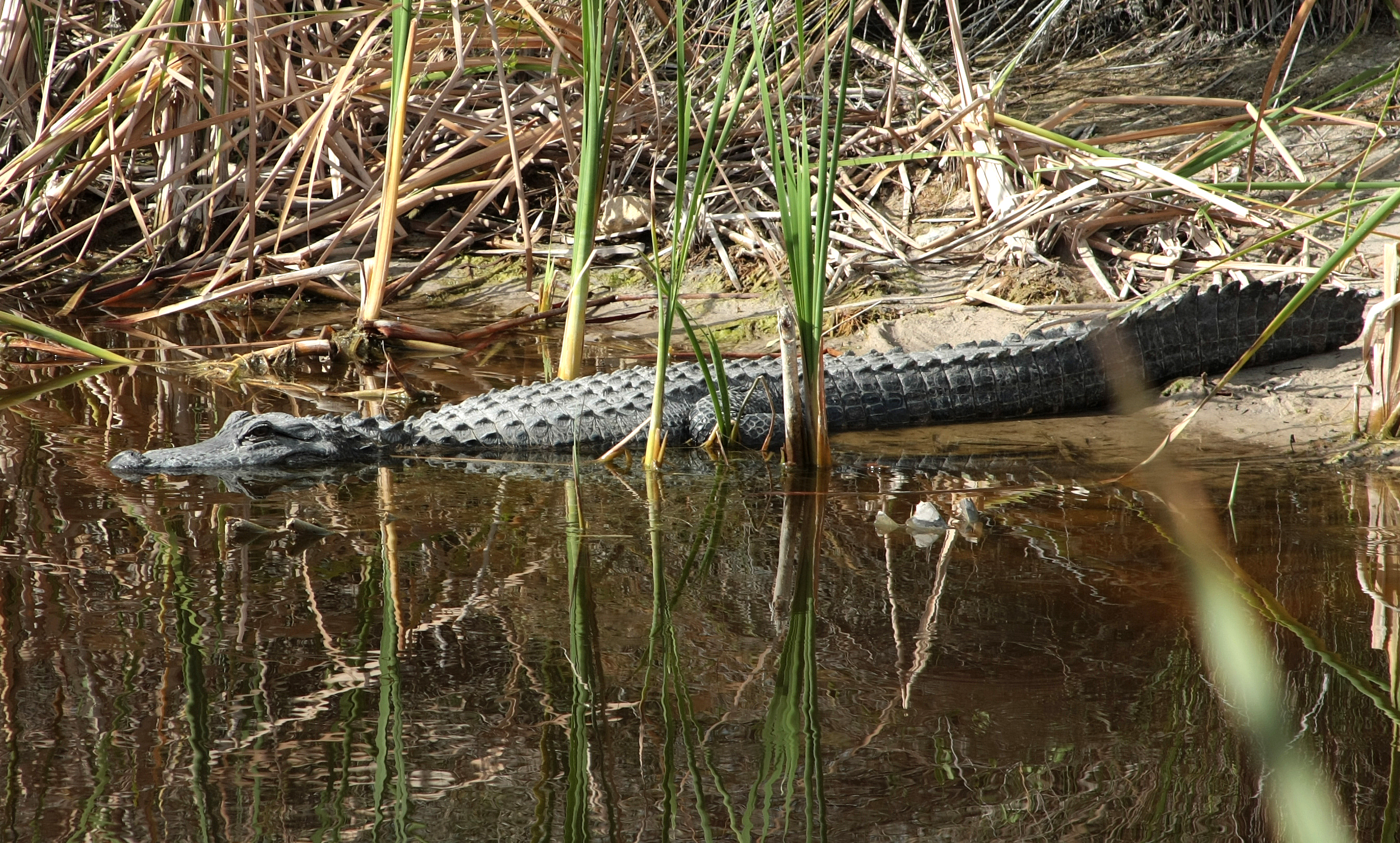
American alligator, delisted 1987

The 50th anniversary of the ESA was in December 2023. As the time approached, interest groups and journalists began writing about the results of its implementation. As of August that year, an aggregate of 1,780 species had been cumulatively listed as "endangered" or a lesser category of "threatened". While 99% of the total species were still alive, critics pointed out that only 64 species had improved enough to be declared as recovered and thus removed from the list (delisted). A data point on the positive side was that a different set of 64 species had improved enough to be downlisted from endangered to threatened.

Among the most celebrated successes is that of the American alligator. This reptile was listed as endangered in 1967. Twenty years later it was delisted as fully recovered. However, because of its resemblance to its endangered saltwater relative in Florida, the American crocodile, hunting and commercial trade regulations have been maintained for this species.

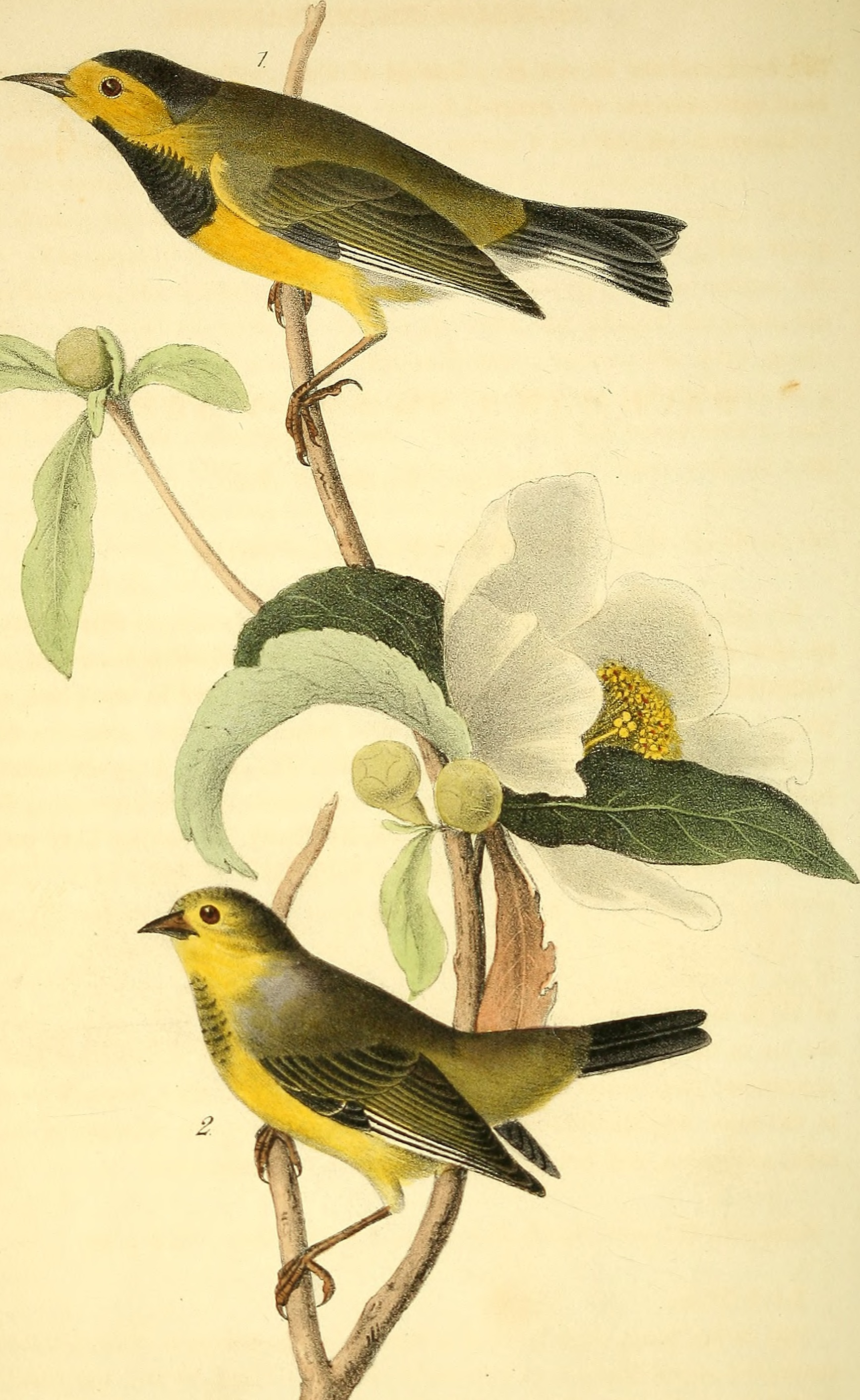
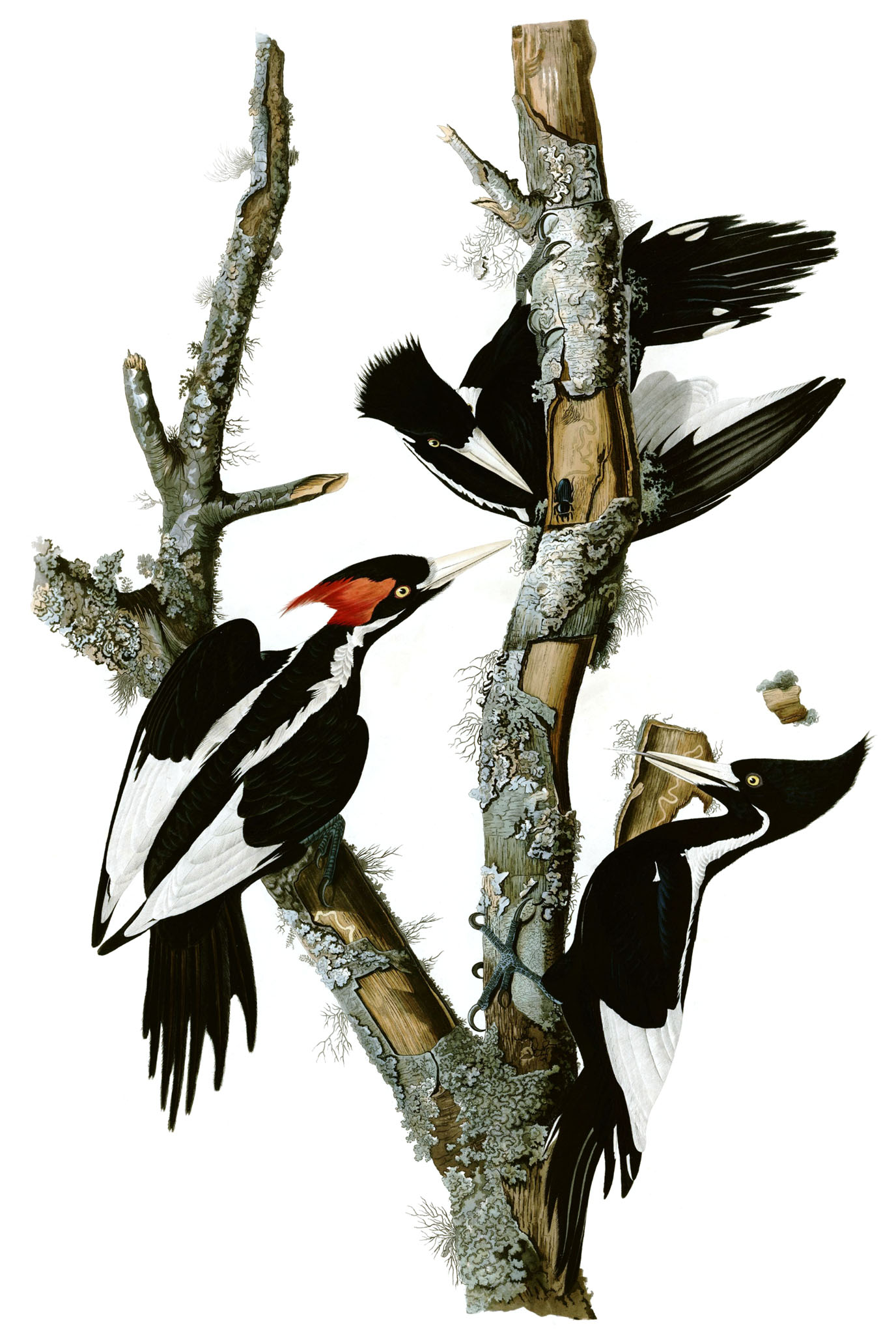
Bachman's warbler was declared extinct, but Ivory-billed woodpecker was not.

The most controversial measure of effectiveness, however, pertained to the published number of cumulatively listed species that had gone extinct. As the autumn of 2023 began, the official number was 11. But another 23 species had gone missing for so long that in September 2021 the agency had published a 41-page draft ruling in the Federal Register to officially declare those 23 species extinct.

It took two years for the agency to finalize its proposed ruling, but in October 2023 the controversy was settled. The agency ruled as extinct 21 of the 23 species it had proposed. Declared extinct were Bachman's warbler, which had been native to Florida and South Carolina, along with nine tropical birds (8 in Hawaii and 1 in Guam). Hope still remained for one bird, the Ivory-billed woodpecker. The only other species that remained listed as endangered was a Hawaiian plant in the mint family. Hope for recovery thus continued for the Hawaiian variety of Phyllostegia glabra "due to new surveys identifying new, potentially suitable habitats for the species."

Another controversy has been ongoing for more than three decades. Some have argued that the recovery of imperiled flesh-eating birds (notably, the bald eagle, brown pelican, and peregrine falcon) should be attributed to the 1972 ban of the pesticide DDT by the EPA, rather than the Endangered Species Act. Supporters of the Act argue that listing these species as endangered led to additional actions that were also crucial for species recovery (i.e., captive breeding, habitat protection, and protection from disturbance).

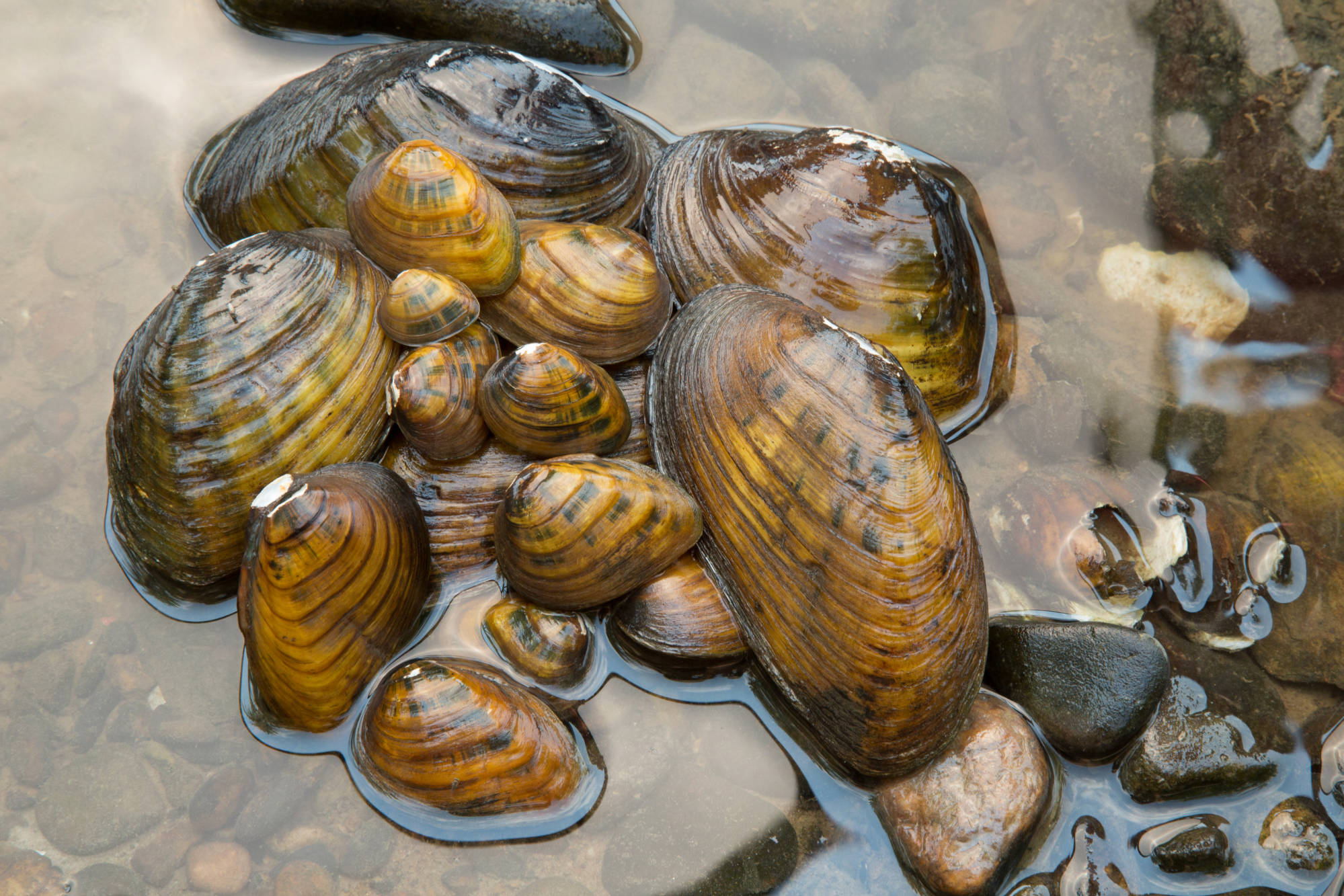
Examples of freshwater mussels imperiled in the eastern USA

Among the most difficult species to protect are mussels because they depend on adequate amounts of clean and flowing freshwater. Home to approximately 300 mussel species, the eastern region of the USA is the center of global diversity for these freshwater molluscs. However, 65 percent of them are threatened or endangered.

The 1988 Congressional amendments to the Act included a new section, Section 18, to aid effectiveness evaluations by having each of the two implementing agencies periodically report cumulative federal funding (and, to some degree, state funding) on a species-by-species basis. As of 2026, the agency webpage titled "Endangered and Threatened Species Expenditures Reports" lists and links annual reports from fiscal year 1989 through 2020, but for no later years. A synthesis report to Congress for fiscal years 2017 through 2020 is also available and provides these statistics: "Of the 1,388 status reviews completed, 93 percent (1,294) recommend no change in status for the species, 3 percent (40) recommend reclassifying from endangered to threatened, 3 percent (38) recommend delisting (22 due to extinction, 13 due to recovery, and 3 due to error), 1 percent (13) recommend reclassifying from threatened to endangered, and less than 1 percent (2) recommend a revision to the listed entity."

=== Recovery and delistings are rare ===
The above section on "effectiveness" of the Act is examined here as to why it is that recovery, and thus delistings, are rare.

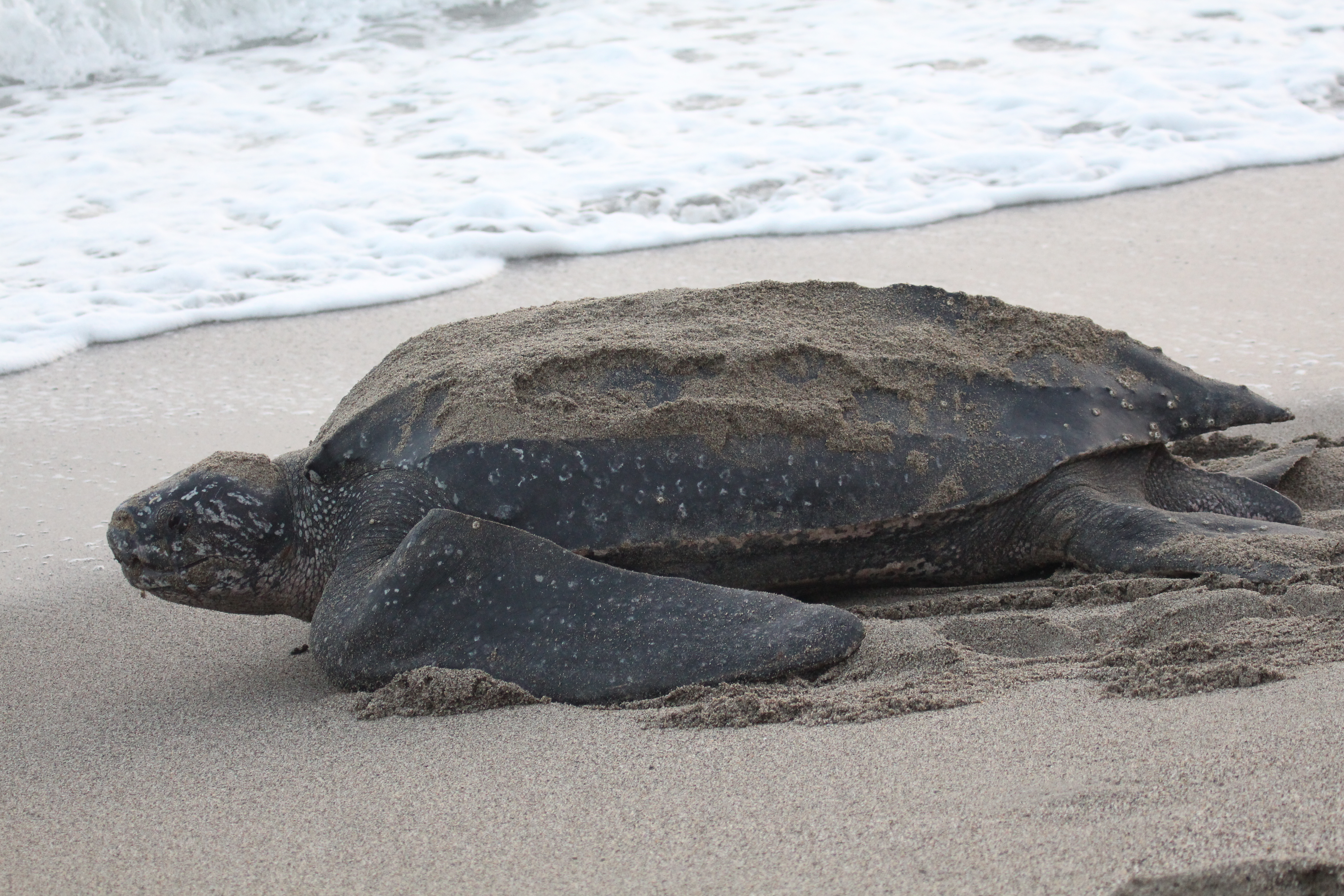
Leatherback sea turtle returning to the ocean after laying eggs in sand pits it had dug in the upper beach

A widely used statistic supporting effectiveness of the Act is that 99 percent of listed species have not gone extinct. In 2012 the Center for Biological Diversity issued a report that surveyed a sample of 110 listed species and concluded that 90 percent of them were recovering "at the rate specified by their federal recovery plan."

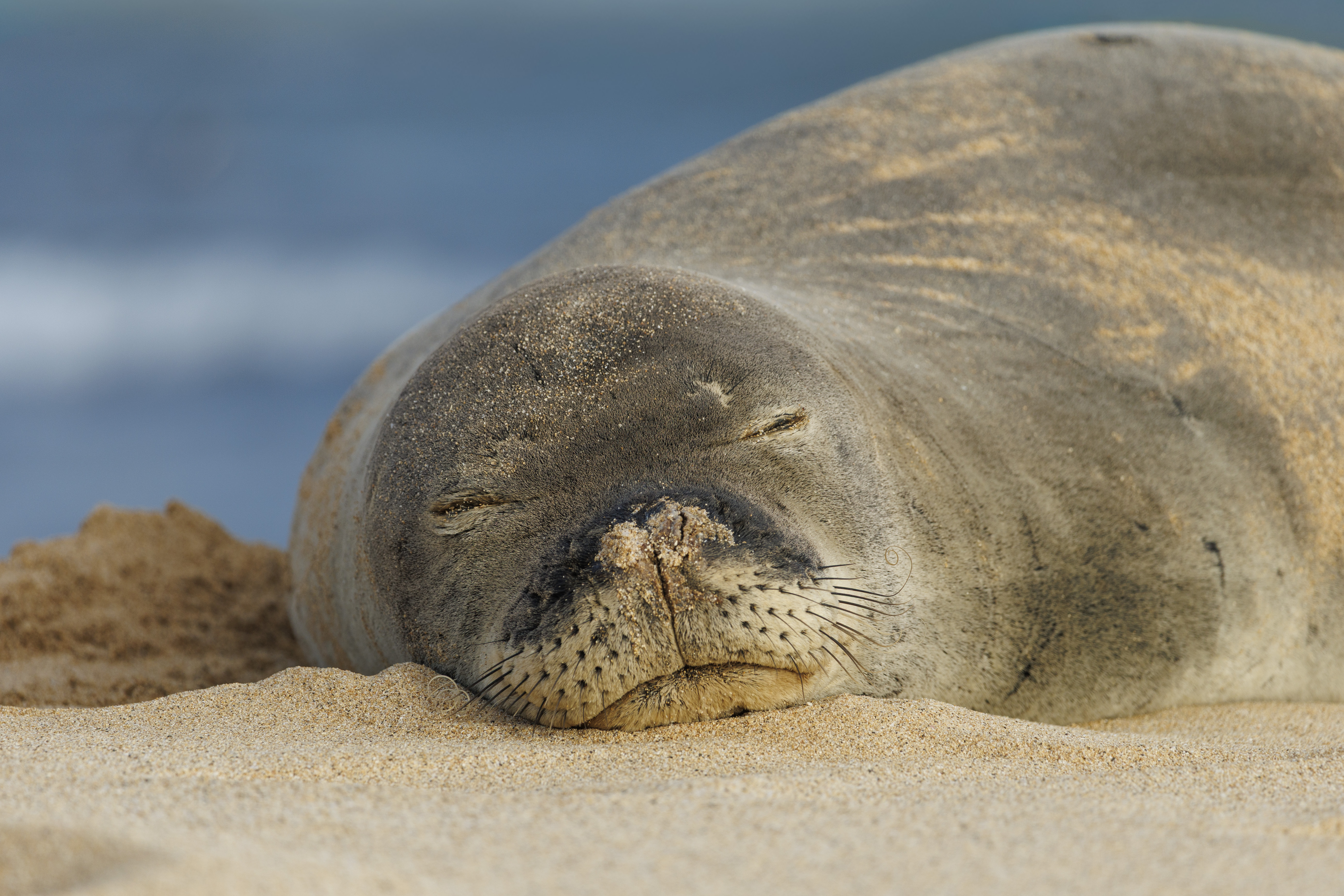
As of 2026, the Hawaiian monk seal is still listed as endangered under the ESA.

Full recovery may thus be slow, but substantial progress is evidenced when a species is downlisted from endangered to threatened. For example, National Marine Fisheries Service lists eight species (or populations of a species) as among the most at risk of extinction in the near future. These animals are the Atlantic salmon; the Central California Coast coho salmon; the Cook Inlet beluga whale; the Hawaiian monk seal; the Pacific leatherback sea turtle; the Sacramento River winter-run chinook salmon; the southern resident population of killer whale; and the white abalone. Human activities are presented as the primary cause of extinction threats for all these species. While the two implementing agencies have a combined record of changing species status from threatened to endangered on nine occasions, the number of status improvements from endangered to threatened is greater.

On the opposing side of the spectrum, a foundation associated with the Western Caucus of U.S. senators and representatives issued a 116-page report in 2023 that points to data and statements made by the U.S. Fish and Wildlife Service during the past half-century that can be interpreted as disputing proclamations of success. Specifically, statements of numbers of species "recovered" do not distinguish between those delisted owing to actual improvement in populations versus those for which the original population numbers were later found to have been greatly underestimated. Had the science been more in line with reality at the start, this report claims 36 of the 62 species reported by the agency as officially recovered would not have achieved listing at the outset.

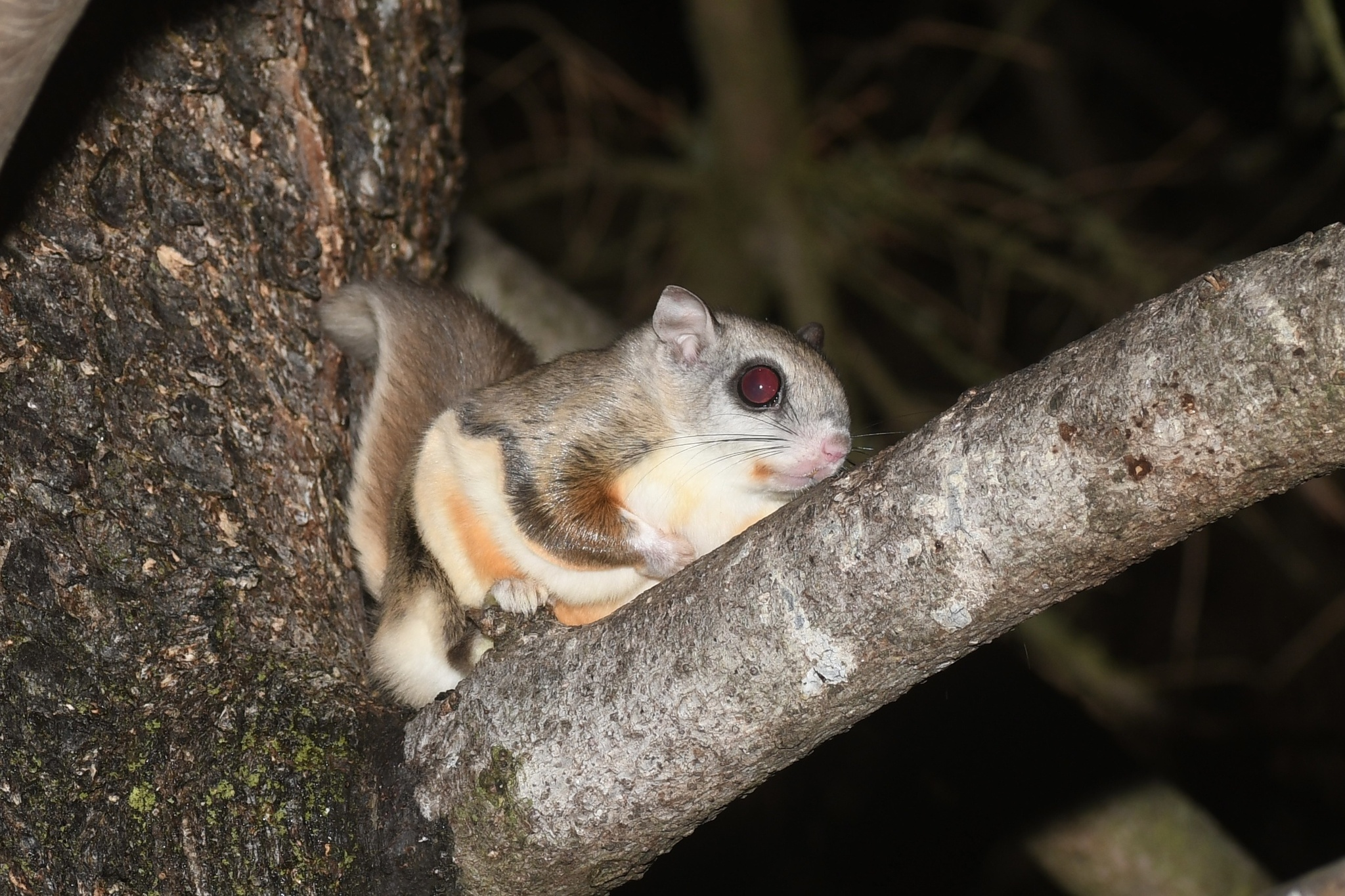
The Northern flying squirrel entails 25 subspecies in North America.

Delisting in 2008 of the Virginia northern flying squirrel is one of the examples officially counted as a "recovery." However, the basis for delisting proved to be a combination of a wrongly inferred subspecies taxonomic status and a faulty initial population count that neglected to search for the animal across the border into West Virginia.

Controversy also develops when the science used to support a delisting decision differs from the numerical population thresholds included in the species recovery plan. For example, the listing of the California sea otter has been controversial with fishermen who contend that the sea otter's expansion from Monterey into Southern California waters has resulted in a dramatic reduction in sea urchin, abalone, and other commercially valuable species. These impacts led certain fishermen groups to petition the government to delist the sea otter. The petition argued that delisting is appropriate because, among other reasons, the sea otter's population goals, as contained in the most recent recovery plan, have been met. The government, however, denied the petition. A 2012 court case upheld the agency decision, ruling that published recovery criteria are not legally binding for later delisting decisions. Accordingly, during the early 2020s an even more controversial agency response against a delisting petition was supported by that court decision. It pertained to the grizzly bear in six distinct populations.

In 2022 a research paper pointed to a set of three factors that contribute to the low number of delistings: "The combination of delays in listing rare species, the typically small population sizes of species at time of listing, and inadequate funding for recovery actions, are the key factors that can explain the relatively small number of listed species that have fully recovered." More fundamentally, while the statute requires the agencies to develop recovery plans, "the ESA imposes no duty to implement recovery plans or to ensure the recovery of listed species."

In 2024 a "new metric to evaluate recovery progress" was published by 13 coauthors. They noted widespread deficiencies in monitoring population changes and threats through time that hampered the agency in "making recovery actions more achievable and proactive, rather than having conservation efforts remain reactive." A review paper published in 2025 offers that, back when the Act was written, "it was likely unanticipated that many endangered species would have no hope of recovery to the point of not requiring ongoing management attention." Therefore, "the law does not provide guidance on managing species for which no recovery option exists."

=== Delays in specifying recovery actions ===
Listing of a species "triggers two overlapping types of conservation measures: extinction prevention and recovery actions." An official document required by the Act has come to be known as a recovery plan. The Act "gives few guidelines for their preparation and content and does not specify a deadline for how soon after listing the Services must complete recovery plans." A 2023 report on the Act issued by Defenders of Wildlife calculated that "265 species listed under the Act lack recovery guidance of any kind, while 370 additional species lack final recovery guidance." The group also noted that more than half of the existing recovery plans were more than 20 years old.

Besides alleged funding inadequacies, several inherent problems have been pointed to for delays in agency translation of scientific findings into actions beyond extinction prevention and thus actively toward species recovery. One such problem is the "knowledge—action boundary" that distinguishes conservation scientists from conservation managers. That is, how can scientific scholarship be made actionable, and thereby contribute directly to forward-moving policies and practices? Impediments to generating boundary-spanning conservation science include "a reward structure in science that promotes publication and grant income rather than engaging with conservation practitioners." Distrust across the boundary may also develop if conservation managers perceive that ESA funding allocated to research or monitoring reduces what is available for recovery actions.

"Fear of failure in conservation" is another factor that contributes to agency and manager hesitancy to undertake recovery actions for which there is no certainty of success. There are two reasons why scientists themselves may abstain from recommending actions. One is fear that making such recommendations may compromise their status as objective researchers whose conclusions can be trusted. A second is fear that a recommended action that is undertaken but then fails may injure their reputation. These fears may be heightened when recommendations pertain to a species for which controversy has developed or one whose population has declined so drastically that any manipulation of the species or its habitat may later be denounced as contributing to its further decline or extinction. Thus there are multiple reasons why recovery programs for some species "may be trapped in a cycle where more resources are allocated to information gathering versus action."

Species recovery is slowed by inherent complexities. The U.S. Fish & Wildlife Service maintains a webpage that sets forth the stages of the recovery process. Included is a linked list of 7 named "services" that the agency offers to assist collaborative parties in accomplishing beneficial actions themselves:

- recovery challenge grants
- recovery land acquisition grants
- 3-200-59: Scientific Purposes, Enhancement of Propagation, or Survival Permits (Recovery Permits)
- Conservation Benefit Agreements
- 3-200-54: Enhancement of Survival Permits Associated with Conservation Benefit Agreements
- Habitat Conservation Plans
- 3-200-56: Incidental Take Permits Associated with a Habitat Conservation Plan

=== Failure to implement recovery actions ===
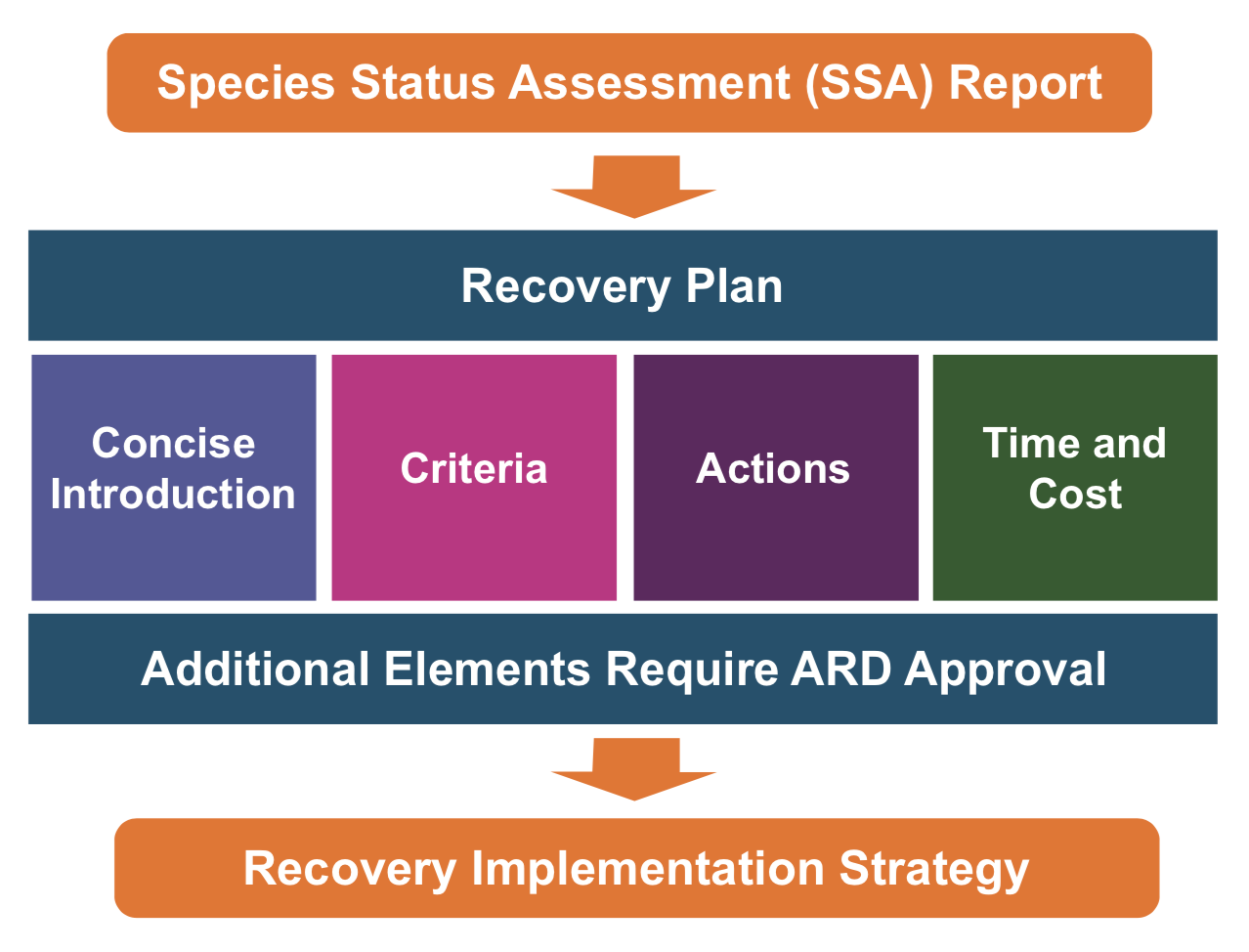
3-part framework for "Recovery Planning and Implementation" (USF&WS, April 2019)

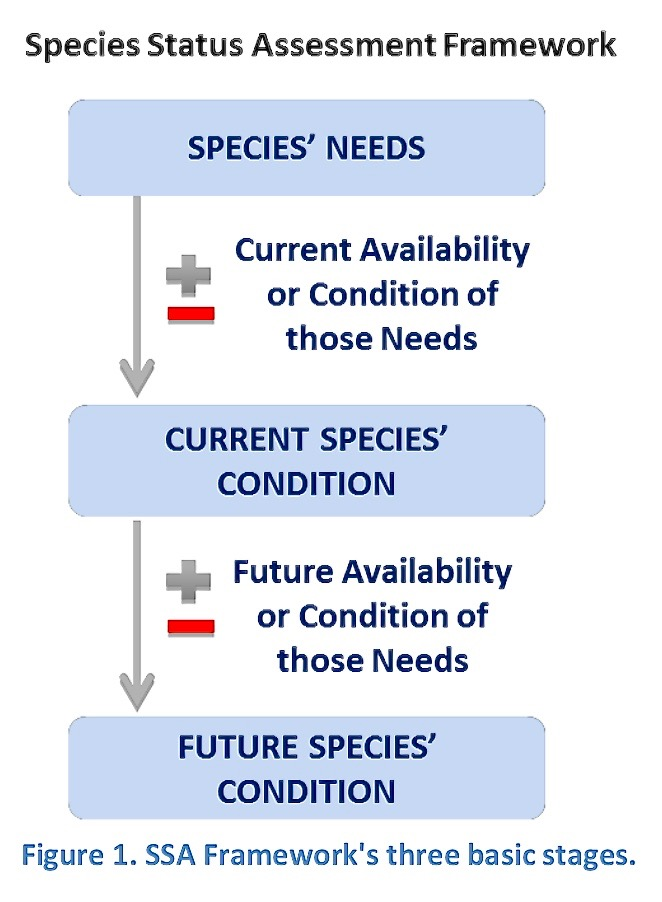
"Species Status Assessment Framework" of the U.S. Fish & Wildlife Service

The U.S. Fish and Wildlife Service itself has recognized that specifying in a written plan the actions to achieve recovery goals falls short of ensuring that such actions will take place. Indeed, the agency recognizes that "Recovery plans are guidance and not regulatory documents, and no agency or entity is required by the Endangered Species Act (ESA) to implement actions in a recovery plan." Therefore, beginning in 2016, the agency augmented standard recovery planning by shifting to a three-part framework. Statutory and regulatory requirements for producing an initial recovery plan are still fulfilled, including opportunities for public comments. The plan is to be written and published in the customary way, and it continues to be subject to the "five year review" process. However, two new kinds of working documents can be developed, posted, and updated as needed for each listed species.

The first updatable document is a Species Status Assessment (SSA). It is "a biological risk assessment to aid decision makers who must use the best available scientific information to make policy decisions under the ESA." As new papers are published and rigorous data collected, the SSA can be updated and reposted as warranted. As of April 2026, 455 listed or petitioned species have had an SSA completed and posted on the FWS aggregate list.

SSA updates may, in turn, stimulate changes in the third part of the new framework: the Recovery Implementation Strategy (RIS). While recovery actions are policy level decisions that will continue to be delineated in the official recovery plan, the RIS serves as "a short-term, more flexible operational document focused on how, when, and with whom the recovery actions will be implemented." A single species may ultimately have a number of RIS documents posted — each pertaining to a different entity, such as a land trust or botanical garden, that steps forward (with or without federal funding) to voluntarily engage in one or more specific recovery actions:

The RIS is to be developed with conservation partners outside of the agency, and focuses on the period of time and scope of activities that work best for those collaborators to achieve recovery goals. Many RISs can be developed, specific to partners and/or activities, and can cover varying timeframes, as needed. If multiple RISs are developed, an 'umbrella framework' (an overarching RIS) outlining the relationships and priorities among the individual RISs is developed to ensure strategic implementation of the overall recovery program for the species.

Because the agency had been criticized for lacking "clear distinctions between science input and policy application," four FWS agency scientists along with two colleagues in the U.S. Geological Survey published a paper in 2018 in the Journal of Fish and Wildlife Management. Titled, "Development of a Species Status Assessment Process for Decisions under the U.S. Endangered Species Act," the authors determined that "the SSA results in a scientific report distinct from policy application, which contributes to streamlined, transparent, and consistent decision-making and allows for greater technical participation by experts outside of the USFWS, for example, by state natural resource agencies."

=== Stakeholder initiatives (with or without listing) ===
With or without listing, there are opportunities for stakeholders themselves to begin actions on their own. This especially applies to habitat improvements. If suitable habitat for a species can be found on private, state, municipal, or tribal lands, there is no need to wait for the federal agency to offer or specify in-place actions. The parties can expand and improve such habitats on their own. For example, a National Park Service report in 2023 in behalf of the endangered Karner blue butterfly included a recommendation to "encourage entities (city, state, county, tribal, federal) with sandy soils north of the current range to plant Lupinus perennis and nectar plants" in anticipation of future authorization for "managed relocation" of populations threatened by heat and drought in southerly portions of the butterfly's historical range.

While there are legal limitations on what citizens and other stakeholders can do directly for listed animal species, the field is wide open for obtaining horticulturally produced seeds and specimens of listed plants and then conducting plantings on their own. A well-known example is a network of citizens who call themselves Torreya Guardians. Florida Torreya is a glacial relict species of subcanopy tree that was listed as endangered in 1984. Since 2004, the citizen group has been using seeds from mature plantings on private lands in North Carolina (and since 2018 also from their own plantings in Ohio) to engage in a form of assisted migration poleward of this climate-endangered plant.

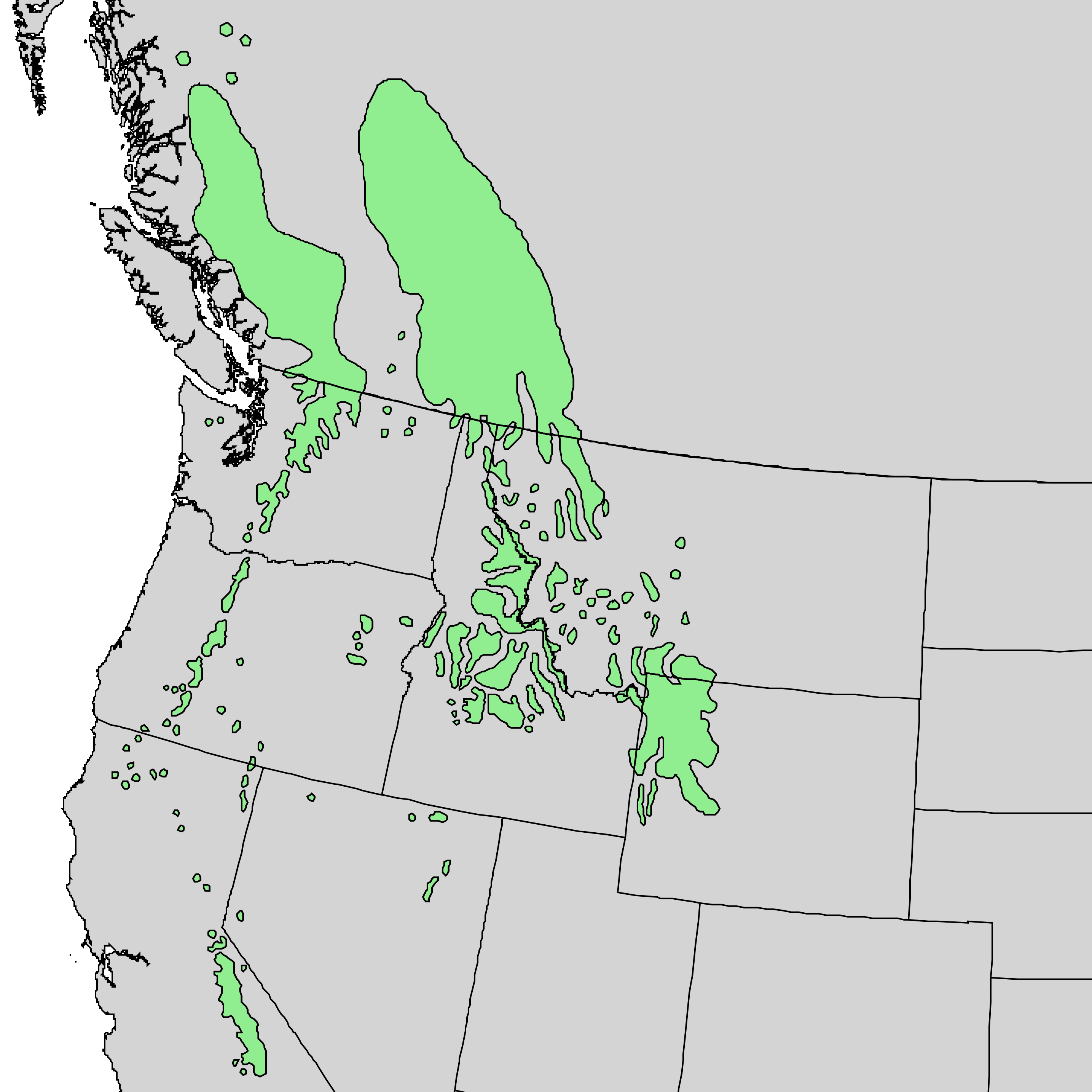
Historically native range of the Whitebark Pine

Prior to listing of a species, stakeholders who wish to act in its behalf have freedom to engage with not only habitat but with the species itself. A well-known example entails actions taken in behalf of the subalpine Whitebark Pine of the northern Rocky Mountains soon after vast stands suddenly began to die in Yellowstone National Park and elsewhere. A petition for listing was submitted in 2008, but status as "threatened" was not conferred until 2022. By then, collaboration among concerned parties was well underway without agency direction. Supportive research and actions were undertaken by the conservation organization American Forests as well as a new organization specific to the tree: the Whitebark Pine Ecosystem Foundation. Other collaborators include research scientists within the U.S. Forest Service, geneticists at the University of California, Davis, and the Confederated Salish and Kootenai Tribes. The U.S. Bureau of Land Management and the National Park Service were also involved in consultation prior to listing by the agency in charge of endangered species: the U.S. Fish and Wildlife Service. A 188-page Species Status Assessment published in 2021 aggregates the scientific information on which the policy decision to list the species as threatened was based.

Controversy is also apparent, though rare, when stakeholders entail activists who regard the "political-economic regime" not as the source of solutions but as "the root cause of biodiversity loss." In such instances guerrilla rewilding of rare species has been known to occur.

=== Collaborative planning on nonfederal lands ===
The 1982 amendments to Section 10 of the Act authorized collaborative engagement of the implementing agencies with landowners in producing Habitat Conservation Plans. Such a plan is a required part of an application for an Incidental Take Permit, issued under the Act to private and other nonfederal entities undertaking projects that might result in harm to a listed species. The intent is to deter controversy by building into the plan practices for minimizing harm to listed species and their core habitat needs (including seasonal peaks in use). A validated plan then absolves the landowner (or developer) from harms that may incidentally occur to the species, when following the plan. Securing landowner pledges of habitat enhancement measures during the planning process can serve to defuse opposition from the public and other stakeholders.

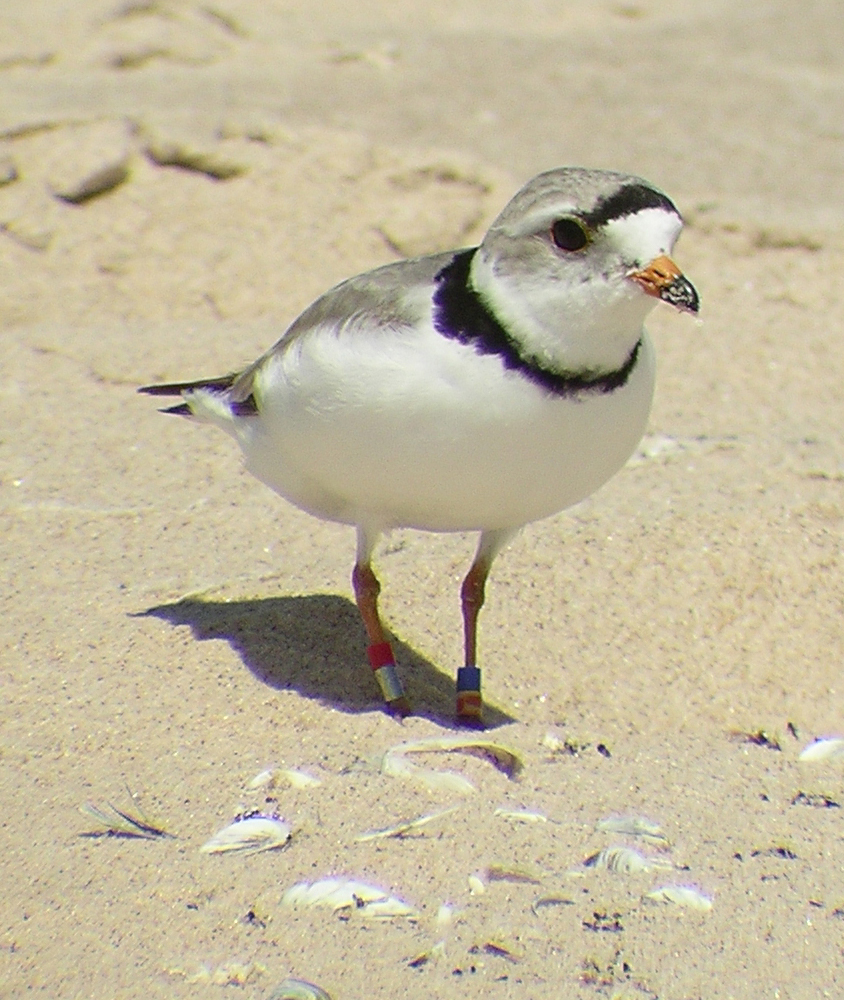
Piping plover in its Atlantic beach nesting habitat

Plan preparation is generally initiated and produced by a nonfederal entity: private landowner, state government, local government. As of 2021, more than 700 habitat conservation plans were in force for listed species. A leading example is the plan produced by the state of Massachusetts in 2016 to reduce conflicts between a type of beach-nesting shorebird, piping plover, and recreational beach users along the Atlantic Ocean. Such plans also apply to the red-cockaded woodpecker of forests in the southeastern states. In 2023, habitat conservation planning for grizzly bears in the northern Rocky Mountains became controversial when an increase in bear deaths caused by trains was reported, along with acknowledgment by the agency that several million dollars of federal funds for the plan participants had not yet been provided for them to engage in their specified mitigation actions.

Summing up the practical difficulties in a 2023 report on the Act, Defenders of Wildlife pointed to underfunding as a continuing problem and that the agencies "lack adequate resources to develop, approve, and monitor these plans, and there are significant data gaps in how many of these plans are performing."

In 2024 a new program went into effect: Conservation Benefits Agreement (CBA). It combined and streamlined two previous opportunities for landowners to initiate their own conservation projects and thereby obtain assurances that stabilize how federal policies apply to their actions. The two previous programs pertaining to Section 10(a) of the Act that were consolidated:

- Safe Harbor Agreement (SHA): These agreements were for species already listed as threatened or endangered.
- Candidate Conservation Agreement with Assurances (CCAA): These were for species that were not yet listed but were possible candidates for future listing.

An example of a CBA that was approved in 2025 was initiated by a minerals corporation with lands in southeastern Arizona. The voluntary agreement benefits three endangered fish species (spikedace, loach minnow, and Gila chub) and one threatened snake (narrow-headed garter snake). The agreement will remain in effect for 50 years.

=== Petitions awaiting listing decisions ===
A 2019 report found that the Fish and Wildlife Service faced a backlog of more than 500 species that have been determined to potentially warrant protection. A 2022 report pointed to severe population declines while species await listing decisions as a major problem impeding eventual recovery success. The decision to list or defer listing of a petitioned species is supposed to take no more than 2 years after a petition is filed. However, on average it takes the agency 12 years to finalize a decision. An analysis published in 2016 by the Ecological Society of America found that approximately 50 species may have gone extinct while awaiting a listing decision. Additional funding might enable the agency to direct more resources toward biological assessments of petitioned species and determine if they merit a listing decision.

An additional issue is that species still listed under the Act may already be extinct. For example, the IUCN Red List declared the Scioto madtom extinct in 2013. This freshwater species had last been seen alive in its small native range in Ohio in 1957. However, it was not until 2023 that the FWS officially declared this catfish as extinct.

As of February 2025, the Fish and Wildlife Service online system that catalogs all current listing proposals that have not yet been processed shows there are 65 outstanding domestic and foreign species. The list aggregates the proposed species into broad taxonomic types. Counting only the domestic (not the foreign) species on the list, there are: 5 amphibians, 3 birds, 13 freshwater clams, 3 crustaceans (crayfish), 8 fishes, 3 flowering plants, 7 insects, 2 mammals (1 rat and 1 bat), 12 reptiles, and 2 snails.

=== Taxonomic status and hybridization ===
Bipartisan support for the Endangered Species Act of 1973 began to unravel almost immediately when a tiny fish native to Tennessee, the snail darter, tested the strong biocentric focus of the Act. Elsewhere on this page, and also on a distinct wikipedia page, the snail darter controversy is dealt with at length. Here it is important to mention that in 2025, tools for making taxonomic determinations had advanced to the point that the snail darter is no longer regarded as a species. Rather, it is a geographically distinct population of the stargazing darter species, which is "present and plentiful in many places in the U.S."

From the beginning, implementation of the ESA of 1973 is based on "the best available science," beginning with taxonomic classification. The petitioned group of organisms must first qualify as a bona fide species or subspecies. Isolated populations or varieties of otherwise common species may be considered for listing only if they are vertebrates. Given the evolutionary processes by which species arise and continue to change, there is no consensus that could provide a singular definition or standard for the agency to use. Classification is therefore determined on a case-by-case basis and generally secured by publication in an academic journal — which itself is vulnerable to publish-or-perish motivations that can lead to what is called taxonomic inflation. This in itself can make the posting of a listing decision vulnerable to public attack. Overturn of the Chevron deference by the U.S. Supreme Court in 2024 may have amplified classification as grounds for litigation by opponents of endangered species listings.

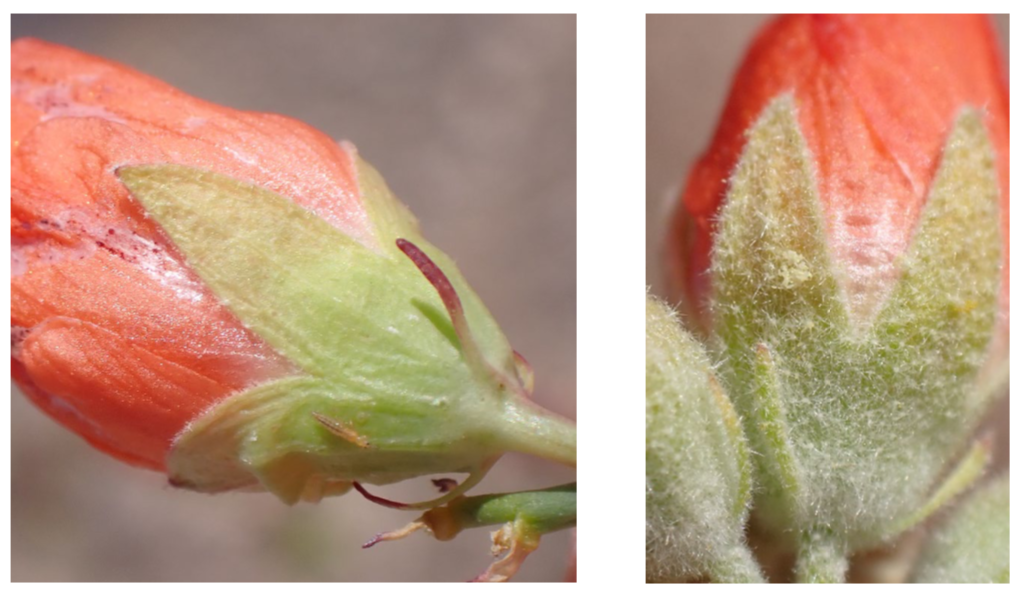
The calyx of the Gierisch mallow (left) is smooth compared to that of the more populous Rusby's globemallow.

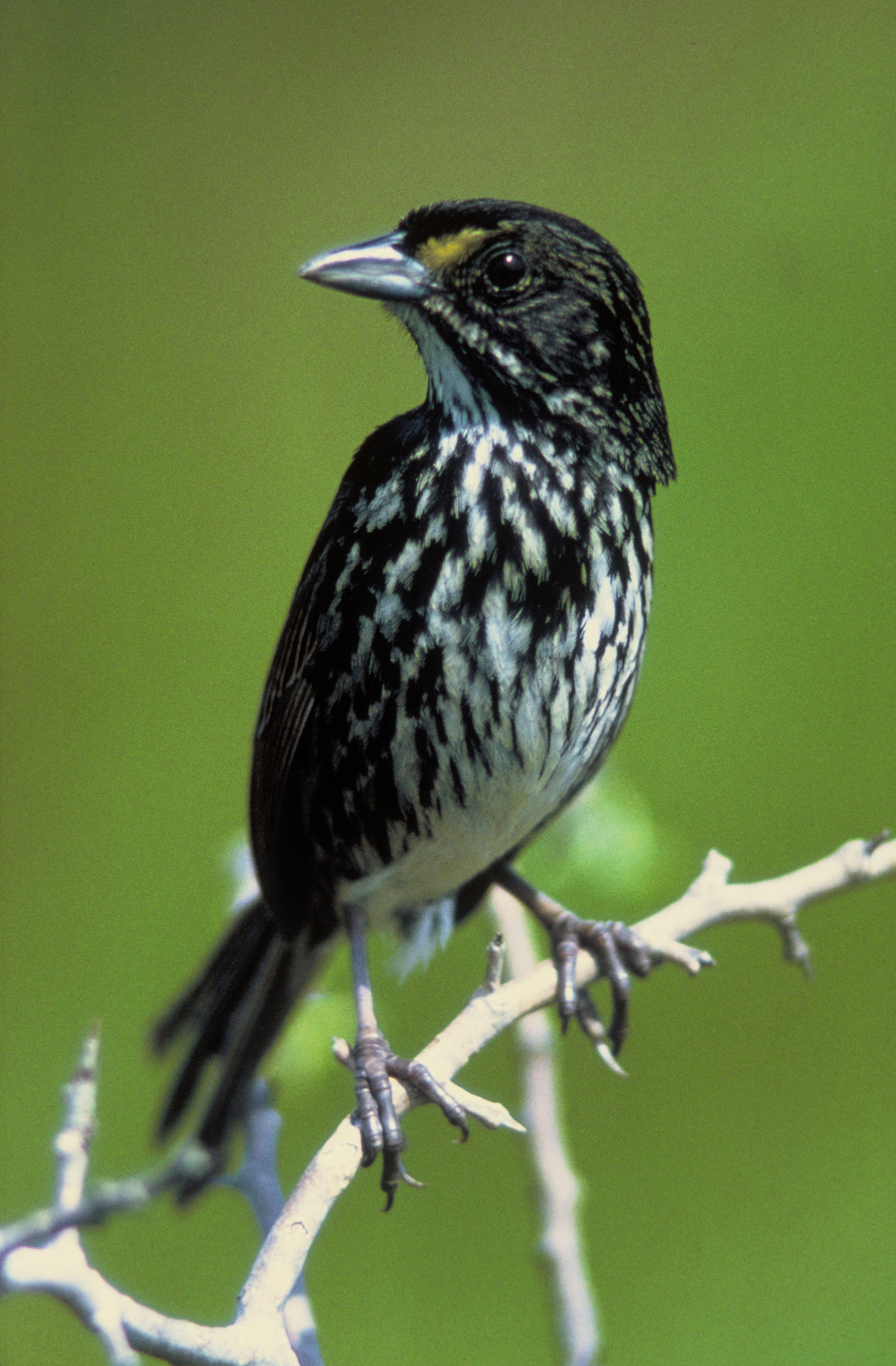
Dusky Seaside Sparrow

Classification boundaries that are imprecise because of geographically remote or interpenetrating hybrid populations pose additional challenges for agency staff attempting to ground listing decisions on "best available science." It is not unusual for listing decisions to become complicated by the presence of hybrids, and the forms of hybridization are diverse. To begin, improvements in conservation genomics established that the already-listed red wolf evolved as a hybrid of native gray wolves and coyotes who interbred in the eastern states. The problem compounded when the red wolf population managed on a coastal island became populous enough for geographic range experimentation. Individuals released onto the mainland routinely interbred with the far more populous coyotes, and genetic swamping ensued. Other listed animals embroiled in hybridization controversies include the golden-winged warbler, westslope cutthroat trout, the wood bison, and the eastern massasauga rattlesnake.

An example for plants in which a taxonomic decision required listing as a distinct species a globe mallow in Arizona concerns the genus Sphaeralcea. A 45-page Species Status Assessment for Sphaeralcea gierischii (Gierisch mallow) published by the agency in 2024 notes that it was classified as a distinct mallow species in 2002 "based on unique morphological features." Accordingly, "because it is a recently described species, we do not know its historical range." A complication for assessing its status is that "coarse estimates of overall plant abundance, gaps in monitoring duration, and interannual variation in plant numbers make it difficult to detect trends in Gierisch mallow abundance." Whether hybridization affects any of its populations is unknown. A 2014 publication was cited that "found approximately one-third of interspecific crosses between 30 Sphaeralcea taxa successful."

Only once has hybridization been an intentional recovery action, known as genetic rescue. This was applied to the Florida panther when cougars from Texas were intentionally released into its habitat to counter ongoing decline owing to inbreeding depression. This openness to using hybridization to outright save a species contrasted with the agency's decision to deny cross-breeding of the dusky seaside sparrow with its sister species: Scott's seaside sparrow. The dusky was declared extinct in 1987. A 2025 review paper reports that naturally occurring hybridization that is already happening "threatens to swamp" these listed taxa: northern spotted owl, bull trout, California tiger salamander, and red wolf.

=== Critical habitat ===
Because habitat loss is regarded as the primary threat to most imperiled species, Section 4 of the Endangered Species Act of 1973 allowed the Fish and Wildlife Service (FWS) and National Marine Fisheries Service (NMFS) to designate specific areas as protected "Critical Habitat" zones. The designation of critical habitat does not affect land ownership. It does not allow the government to take or manage private property, nor to establish a refuge, reserve, preserve, or other conservation area. Critical habitat designation does not allow unauthorized government access to private land. Such designation can, however, severely restrict activities allowable on private lands.

In 1978, Congress amended the law to make critical habitat designation a mandatory requirement for all threatened and endangered species. To offset some of the consequences of this amendment, and to improve flexibility in the ESA's application, the 1978 amendments also added economics into the process of determining such designation. It reads, "... shall designate critical habitat ... on the basis of the best scientific data available and after taking into consideration the economic impact, and any other impact, of specifying ... area as critical habitat." The congressional report on the 1978 amendment anticipated a potential controversy that might ensue, given that "economic impact" was included in the amendment:

"... the critical habitat provision is a startling section which is wholly inconsistent with the rest of the legislation. It constitutes a loophole which could readily be abused by any Secretary ... who is vulnerable to political pressure or who is not sympathetic to the basic purposes of the Endangered Species Act."-- House of Representatives Report 95-1625, at 69 (1978)

The controversy did arise and thus the 1982 amendment to the Act explicitly prohibited similar economic considerations when determining the status of a species.

On the other hand, the congressional report for those 1982 amendments also explained that, "the critical habitat designation, with its attendant economic analysis, offers some counter-point to the listing of species without due consideration for the effects on land use and other developmental interests." According to a 2025 review paper, a range of environmental social sciences have since contributed significant "potential for finding solutions" beyond the scope of what the biological sciences could alone offer.

In designating critical habitat, the needs of open space for individual and population growth, food, water, light or other nutritional requirements, breeding sites, seed germination and dispersal needs, and lack of disturbances are considered. As itemized within a 2008 review paper on the Endangered Species Act, designation of critical habitat is the first priority for agency action following listing of a species. Next is formulation of a recovery plan. Not all recovery plans, however, specify critical habitat. Setting aside this requirement is authorized if the agency head determines that its designation would not be "prudent."

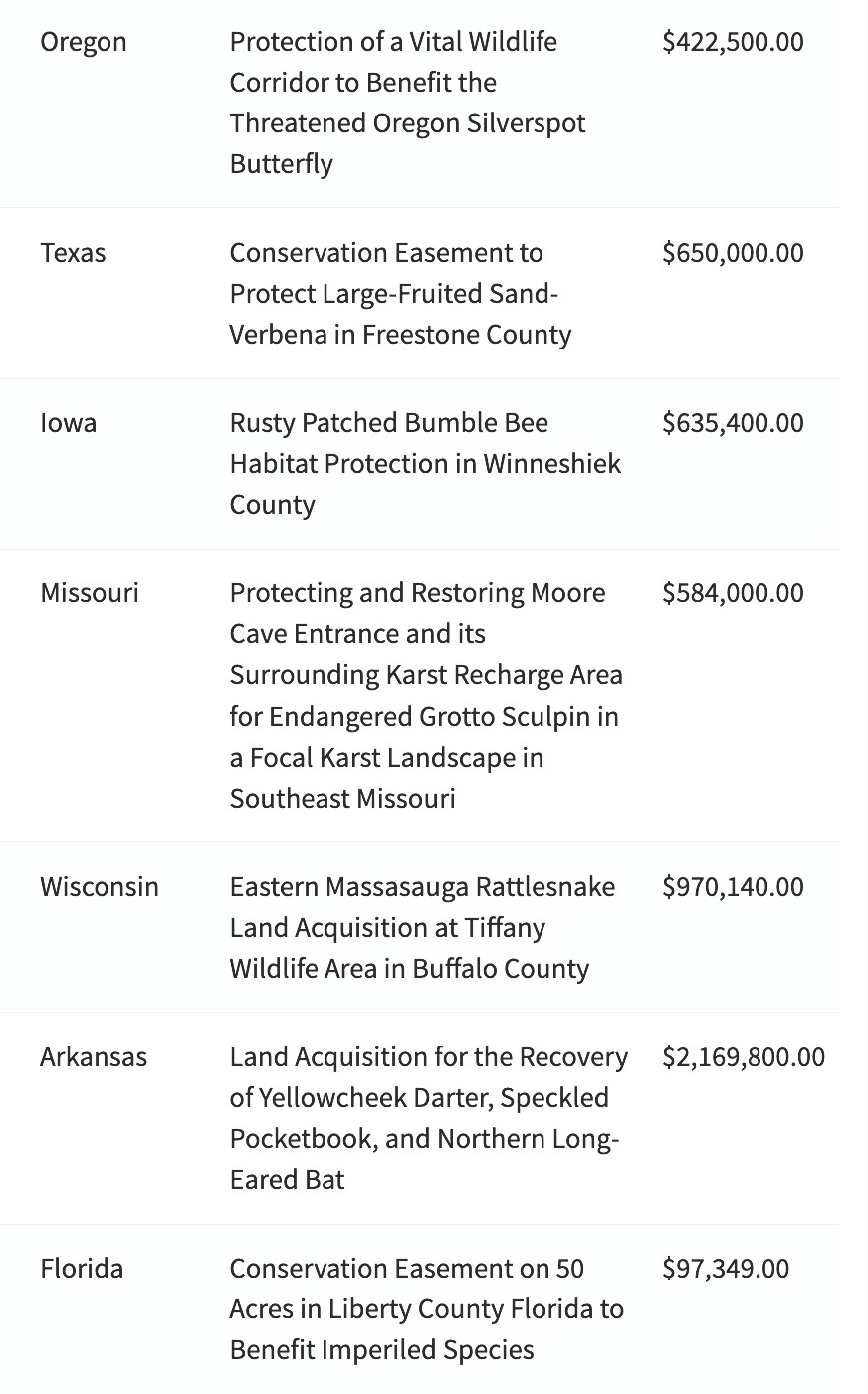
Sample of federal grants in 2024 for endangered species habitat support

Most provisions of the ESA revolve around preventing extinction. Critical habitat is one of the few that focus on recovery. A 2005 paper published in the journal BioScience concluded that species afforded critical habitat are twice as likely to be recovering than are species without critical habitat. A 2016 report published by the Ecological Society of America stated that data were inconclusive on this matter because "in practice, the Services often exempt habitat degradation from regulation. As a result, designating critical habitat has had limited regulatory effect." Overall, disagreement as to the effectiveness of critical habitat designation is expressed in a number of different reports.

Another controversy arises from the Act specifying that critical habitat designation is required to contain "all areas essential to the conservation" of the imperiled species, and may include private as well as public lands. The Fish and Wildlife Service has a policy limiting designation to lands and waters within the U.S., and both federal agencies may exclude essential areas if they determine that economic or other costs exceed the benefit. The ESA, however, is mute about how such costs and benefits are to be determined, and USFWS and NMFS have frequently minimized this exclusion provision's application in favor of large critical habitat designations.

All federal agencies are prohibited from authorizing, funding, or carrying out actions that "destroy or adversely modify" critical habitats (Section 7(a) (2)). While the regulatory aspect of critical habitat does not apply directly to private and other non-federal landowners, large-scale development, logging, and mining projects on private and state land typically require one or more federal permits and thus become subject to critical habitat regulations. Outside or in parallel with regulatory processes, critical habitats also focus and encourage voluntary actions such as land purchases, grant making, restoration, and establishment of reserves.

The Act's specification of the timing of critical habitat designations has also become problematic. The ESA requires that critical habitat be designated at the time of or within one year of a species being placed on the endangered list. In practice, most designations occur several years after listing. Between 1978 and 1986, the FWS regularly designated critical habitat. In 1986 the Reagan administration issued a regulation limiting the protective status of critical habitat. As a result, few critical habitats were designated between 1986 and the late 1990s. In the late 1990s and early 2000s, a series of court orders invalidated the Reagan regulations and forced the FWS and NMFS to designate several hundred critical habitats, especially in Hawaii, California, and other western states. Midwest and eastern states received less critical habitat, primarily on rivers and coastlines. As of December 2006, the Reagan regulation had not yet been replaced, though its use had been suspended. Nonetheless, the agencies have generally changed course. Since about 2005, both have tried to designate critical habitat at or near the time of listing.

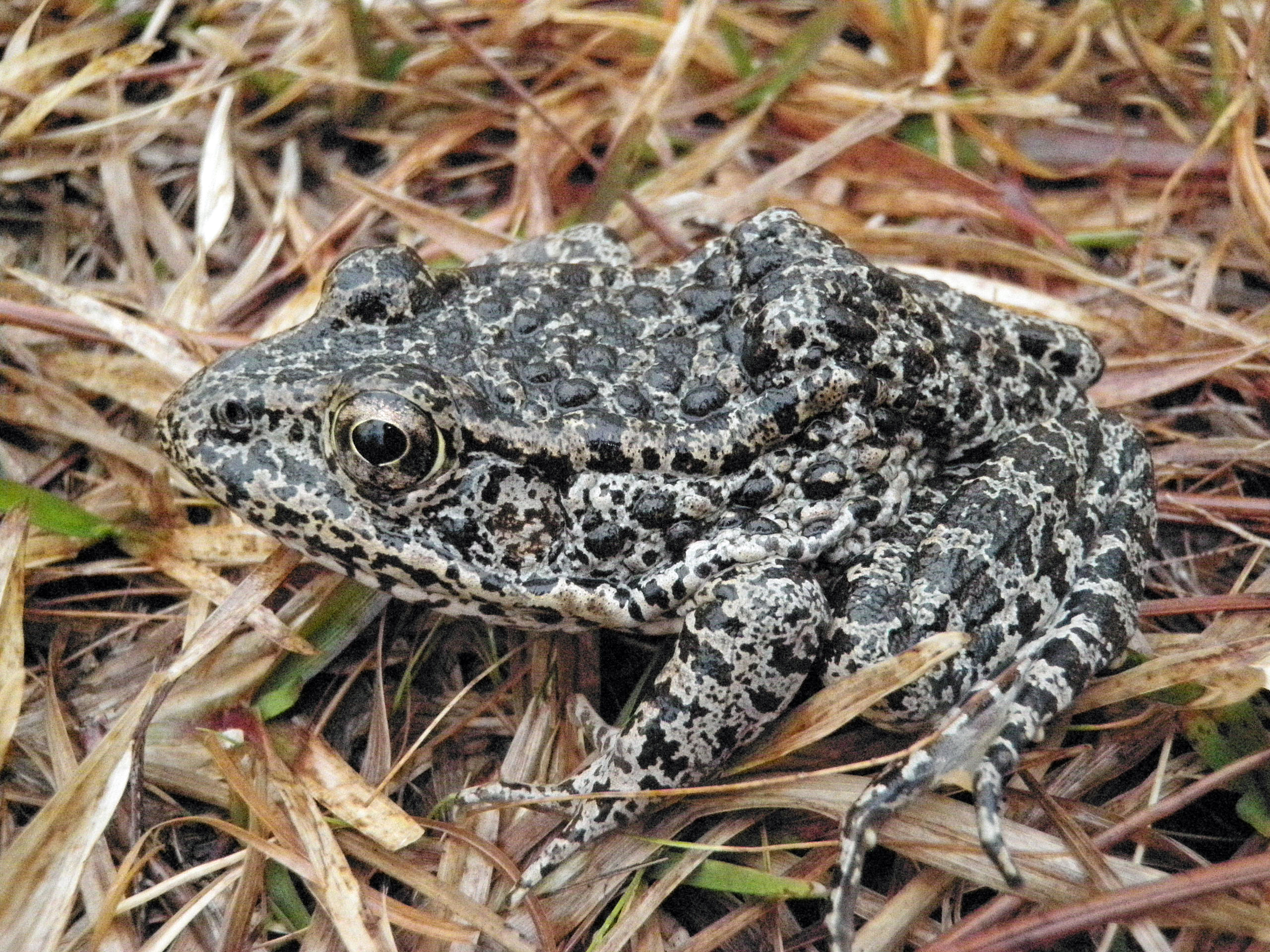
Dusky gopher frog

The designation of critical habitat has proved to be one of the most controversial aspects of the ESA's administration. An example of such controversy can be found in Weyerhaeuser Company v. United States Fish and Wildlife Service. In this 2018 ruling, the U.S. Supreme Court addressed whether land can be designed as critical habitat even if the land cannot support the existence of protected species. The litigation arose over the designation of loblolly pine timberlands in Louisiana as critical habitat for the dusky gopher frog. The plaintiffs objected to the designation of their land as critical habitat, citing its significant economic costs, including the inability to develop the land for commercial and residential uses. Unanimously ruling for the property owners, the Supreme Court held that land cannot be designated as critical habitat if it cannot qualify as habitat. As Chief Justice Roberts' opinion for the Court explains, "[a]ccording to the ordinary understanding of how adjectives work, 'critical habitat' must also be 'habitat.' Thus, "[o]nly the 'habitat' of the endangered species is eligible for designation as critical habitat."

The dusky gopher frog decision at the level of U.S. Supreme Court thus became a key species-specific example of the judiciary setting geographic boundaries on the agency's ability to designate critical habitat happened in 2018. The court ruled as invalid the critical habitat designation of a segment of private timberlands in Louisiana in part because the endangered frog had been extirpated from that state for half a century, currently inhabiting only Mississippi. Equally, it was clear that suitable pond "habitat" for the frog would require a degree of ecological restoration to be performed on the private land.

A 2020 law review article concluded that critical habitat designations were still far underutilized. A delay in the timing of designations (after listing and thus concurrent with the development of a species recovery plan) would automatically provide "significant amounts of information absent from the species listing stage."

=== Climate change as an endangerment cause ===
In 2005 the Center for Biological Diversity petitioned to list the polar bear as threatened, with critical habitat in Alaska. Climate change was among the identified threats. In 2008 the Fish and Wildlife Service issued its decision to list the bear as threatened, while stating that climate change was not amenable to prohibiting or solving within the provisions of the Act:

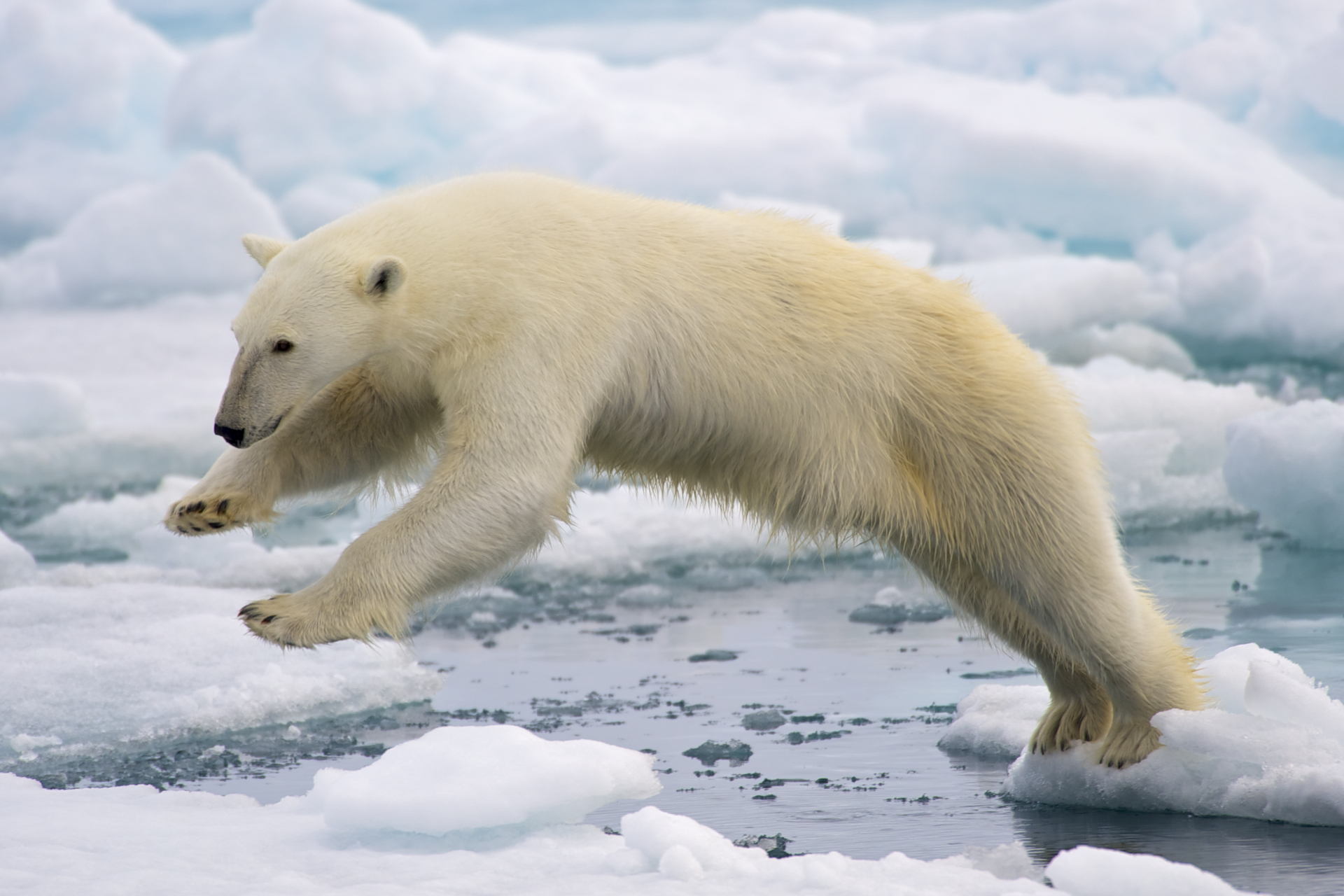
Ursus maritimus

Without the requirement of a causal connection between the action under consultation and effects to species, literally every agency action that contributes greenhouse gases to the atmosphere would arguably result in consultation with respect to every listed species or critical habitat that may be affected by climate change. There is currently no way to determine how the emissions from a specific project under consultation both influence climate change and then subsequently affect specific listed species or critical habitat, including polar bears.

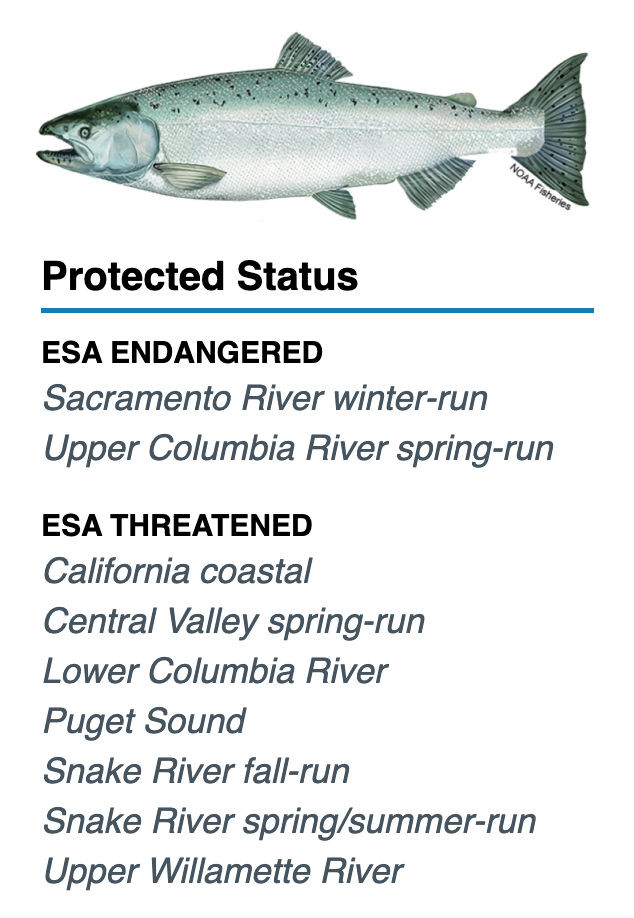
Populations of chinook salmon protected as of 2024

In 2023 another large carnivore, the wolverine, was added to the list "due primarily to the ongoing and increasing impacts of climate change and associated habitat degradation and fragmentation." The word "climate" appears 135 times in its official posting, which entails 46 pages in the Federal Register. Rising temperatures and declining snowpack in the contiguous United States (not Alaska) had made cave denning difficult for the remaining populations in the Cascade Range and Rocky Mountains. The following year, the southernmost subspecies of an alpine and tundra bird, the white-tailed ptarmigan, along the west coast of North America was listed as threatened in Washington state because: "The Service has determined that the loss and degradation of its habitat resulting from climate change will endanger the bird in the foreseeable future."

Because distinct populations of vertebrate species and subspecies can be listed, nine river systems where chinook salmon spawn are now protected under the Act (see image at right). Salmon spawn in freshwater but mature in marine waters, so both the Fish and Wildlife Service and the National Oceanic and Atmospheric Administration manage the listing and recovery actions.

=== Climate adaptation as a recovery tool ===
While climate change was established in 2008 as a legitimate reason for listing a species, subspecies, or population, climate adaptation became an option for recovery actions only in 2023. This was when the geographic scope of the regulation pertaining to "experimental populations" was amended. Although the Endangered Species Act of 1973 (as amended in 1982) did not in itself limit the placement of experimental populations to the "historical range" of a plant or animal, a regulatory change in 1984 made prospective translocations beyond the native range more difficult to justify.

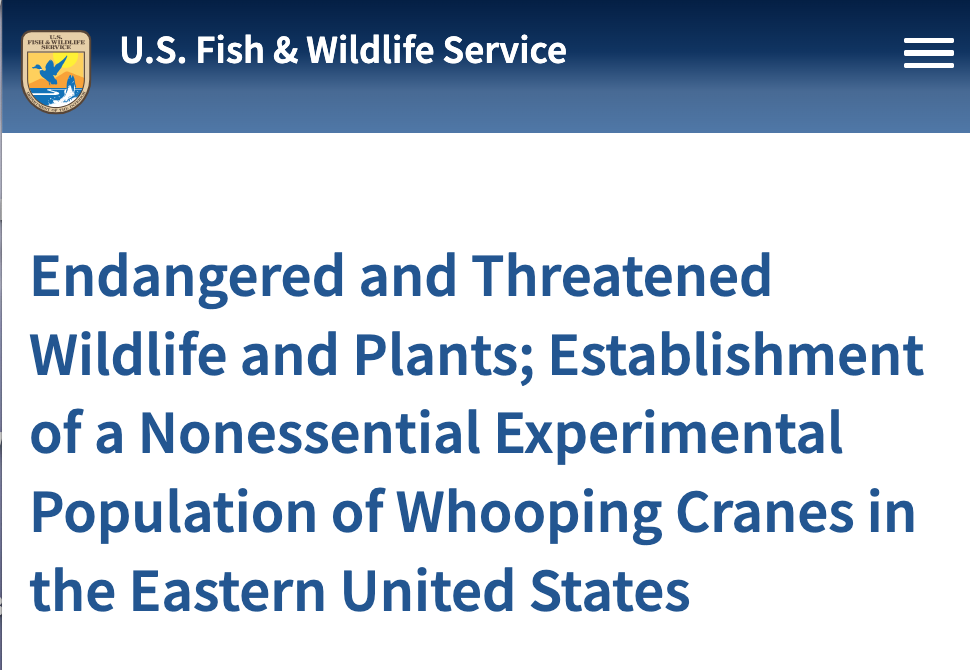
Whooping Crane experimental population authorized in 2001.

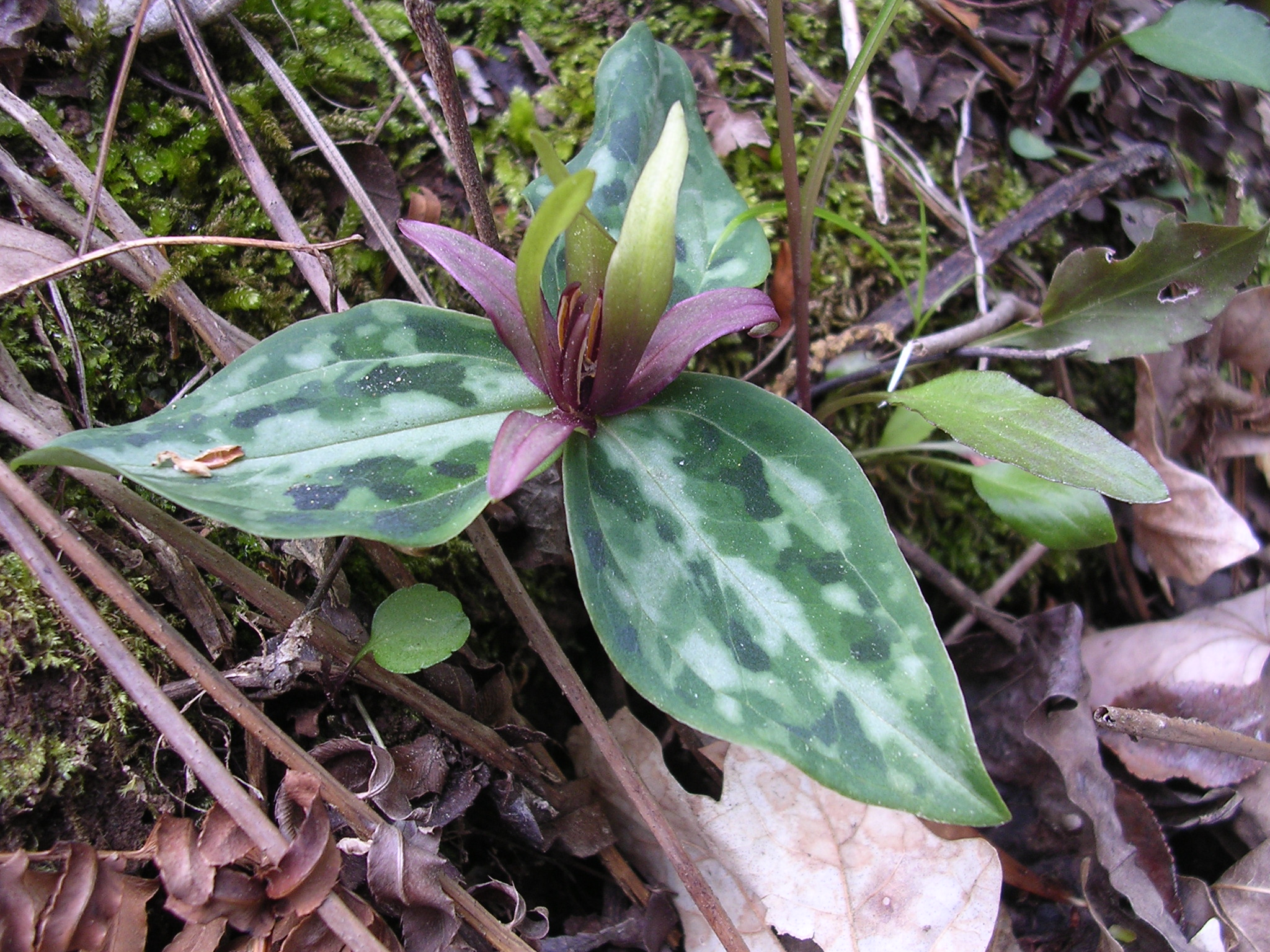
The seeds of Relict trillium are dispersed by ants, hindering its ability to track climate change.

Two Congressional Research Service reports focus on experimental populations. One summarizes its early use for reasons other than climate change, and the other focuses on its past and present use in helping the gray wolf expand much farther into what had been its vast historical range. As of February 2025, 64 species (including several populations of a single species) were listed as already having authorizations to implement "experimental populations." All can proceed on a "non-essential" basis (meaning, losses are expected but will not threaten the integrity of the gene pool). The greatest number of authorizations apply to aquatic species (fishes, clams, mussels). Two large and charismatic birds have been placed into locales far outside of where their last remnant populations survived prior to listing as endangered. These are the California condor and the Whooping crane.

In June 2022, the U.S. Fish and Wildlife Service published a proposed rule in the Federal Register that would "revise section 10(j) regulations under the ESA to better facilitate recovery by allowing for the introduction of listed species to suitable habitats outside of their historical ranges. The proposed change would help improve the conservation and recovery of imperiled ESA-listed species in the coming decades, as growing impacts from climate change and invasive species cause habitats within their historical ranges to shift and become unsuitable." The comment period ended August 2022, with more than 500 comments posted online by supporters and opponents.

As reported on the news page of Audubon, adoption of the proposed regulatory change would authorize, for the first time, use of a controversial climate adaptation tool: assisted migration. The U.S. Department of Interior on June 30, 2023, announced its decision to modify the section 10(j) "experimental populations" rule generally as proposed a year earlier. The press release summarized the reason for the change as, "At the time the original 10(j) regulations were established, the potential impact of climate change on species and their habitats was not fully realized, yet in the decades since have become even more dramatic. These revisions will help prevent extinctions and support the recovery of imperiled species by allowing the Service and our partners to implement proactive, conservation-based species introductions to reduce the impacts of climate change and other threats such as invasive species."

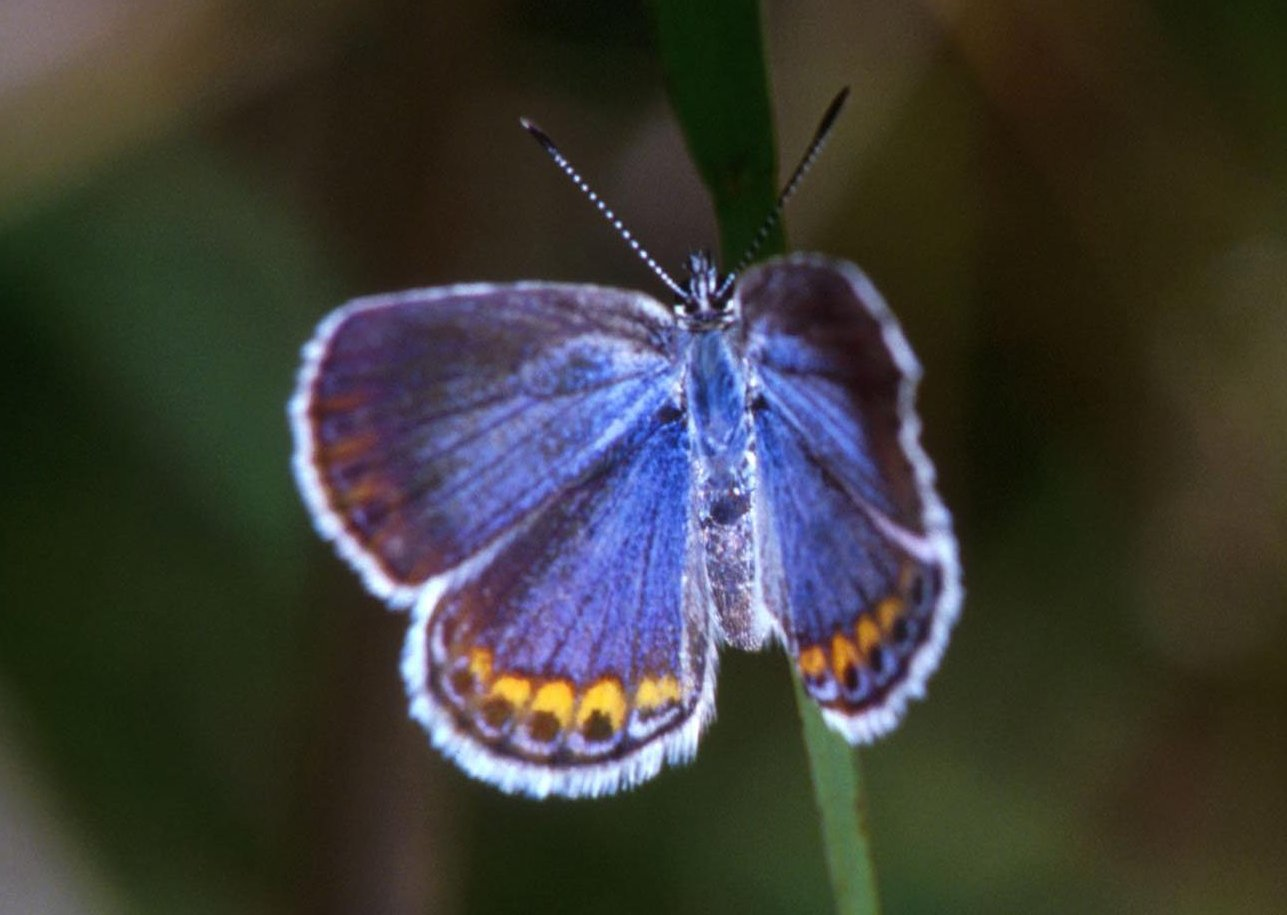
Karner blue butterfly

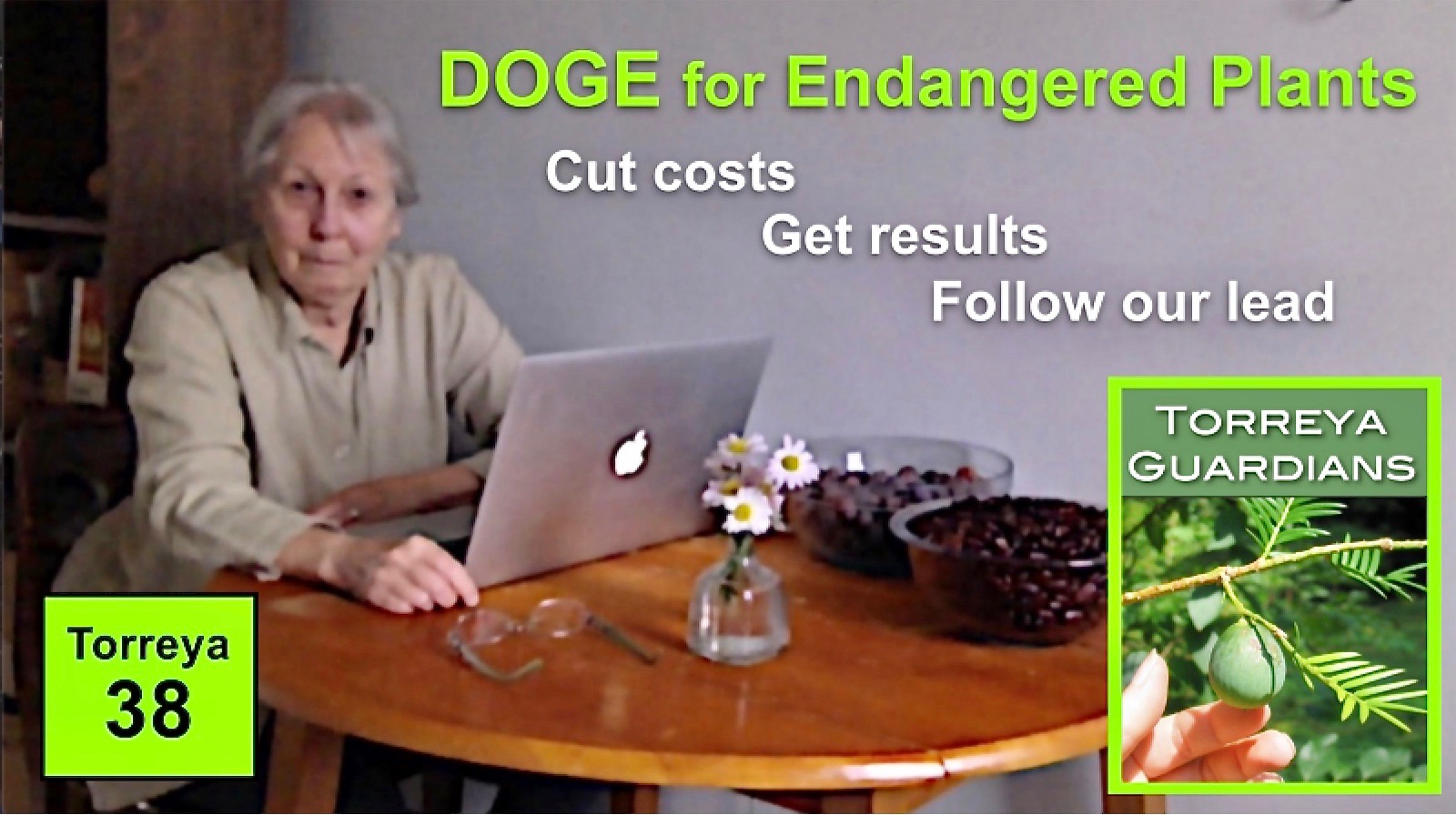
Torreya Guardians Video #38

The rulemaking action includes a section summarizing 25 topics entailed in comments submitted in 2022, along with the agency's official response to each. Pre-existing requirements pertaining to experimental populations in the Code of Federal Regulations (CFR) still apply. Plans to use "Subpart H: experimental populations" for the purpose of climate change adaptation thus require public notice and ultimate placement in the "Species-specific rules" subpart of the CFR regulations of the precise geographic and other details. Six months after this climate adaptation regulation for listed species was published, the National Park Service issued a 154-page report on recommendations for halting the decline of the endangered Karner blue butterfly in its small and scattered populations across the northeastern states. Among the recommendations were "managed relocation" of populations from the southern parts of its range into northward habitats with suitable conditions and supportive plants. The report justified the managed relocation action by noting that stakeholders and managers "are growing more supportive of novel science-based interventions to save rare species from climate change–driven extirpation."

Two weeks after the 2024 United States presidential election, the founder of a citizen group, Torreya Guardians, urged the new administration to utilize the experimental populations regulation to recruit more citizens to help endangered plants. The group had been using their own resources to do this for a critically endangered tree since 2008. Utilizing an exception in the ESA just for plants, they had been experimentally planting Florida torreya, Torreya taxifolia, hundreds of miles northward of its native range (a glacial refugium) in Florida. As reported in Nature Climate Change journal in 2008,

At least on a limited scale, it seems that assisted migration is already happening. One of the most well-known cases is the transfer of Torreya taxifolia, a Florida conifer with a tiny range that many believe survives there only due to historical accident. In a desperate bid to protect their beloved species, a group of botanists and environmentalists who call themselves the Torreya Guardians have established a volunteer seed-planting campaign to move it northwards. On 3 August, they planted 31 Torreya taxifolia seedlings in North Carolina.

=== When delisting leads to recreational hunting ===
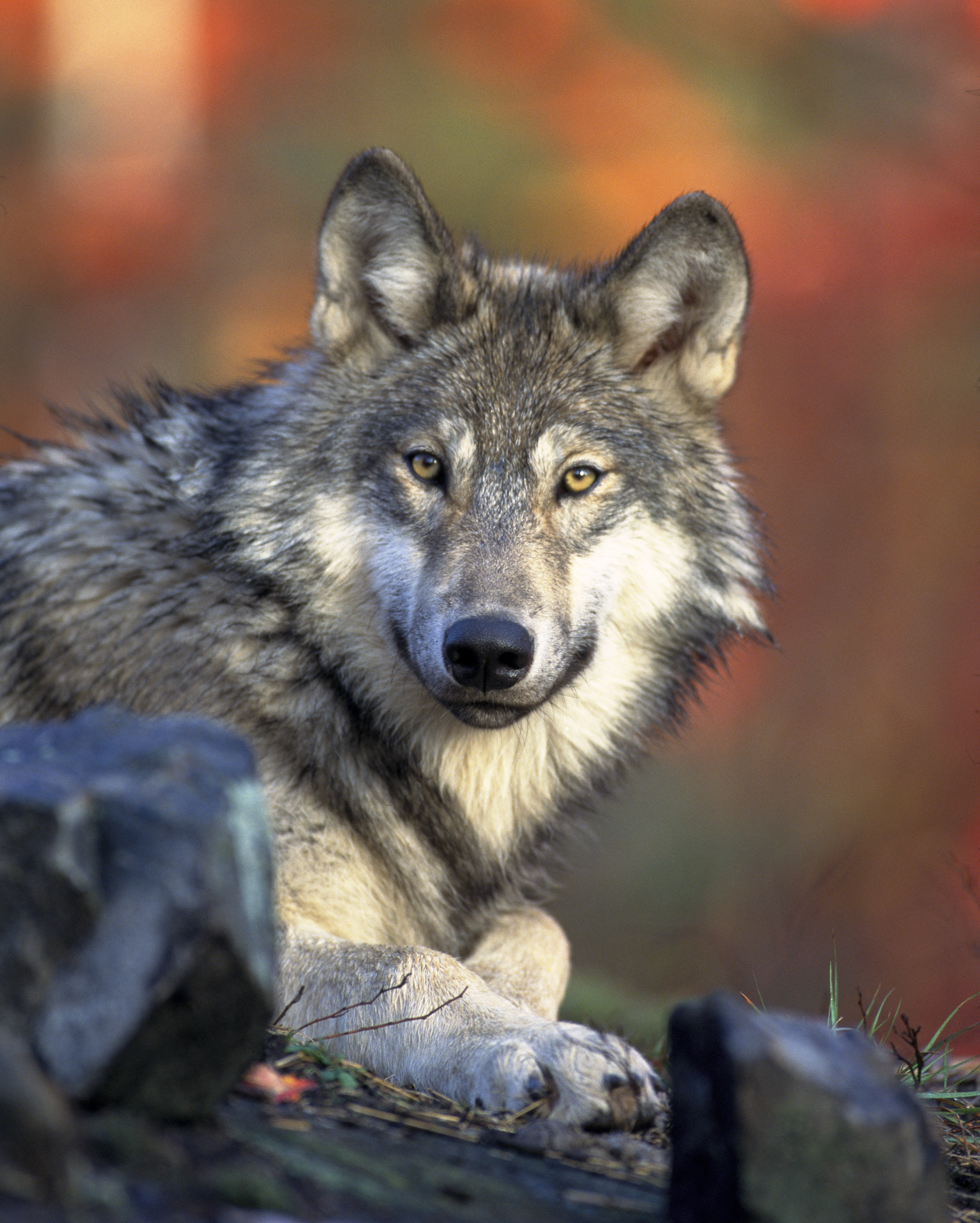
Gray wolf in North America

In October 2020, the Gray wolf (but not the Mexican wolf) was delisted by the federal government in all states. Press releases by the FWS explained the scope and rationale of that action. Several lawsuits challenging the delisting were filed in the U.S. District Court for the Northern District of California. A press release issued by one of the plaintiffs, Defenders of Wildlife, explained, "This decision made wolves vulnerable to hunting, trapping, poisoning, and other lethal controls. Without federal protections, state laws threaten to undo decades of public restoration efforts and prevent the goal of true, nationwide wolf recovery." The advocacy group later posted a history of the status and protection of the gray wolf in the lower 48 states, beginning with its endangered listing in 1978, followed by the first reintroduction of the species into Yellowstone National Park in 1993.

November 2020, the Congressional Research Service published a 46-page report on the gray wolf listing history, subtitled, "A Case Study in Listing and Delisting Challenges." A summary paragraph states the challenges:

From initial listing to recovery and reintroduction efforts to more recent attempts to delist the gray wolf, FWS has addressed such issues as uncertainties in gray wolf taxonomy, ambiguous statutory terms (e.g., "foreseeable future" and "significant portion of its range"), and the adequacy of state management plans. Stakeholders have questioned FWS's choices in comments to the proposed rules and have challenged many of the agency's gray wolf rules in court. Many of the legal challenges to FWS's delisting rules have succeeded, with courts vacating the rules and remanding them to the agency. The history of FWS's regulation of the gray wolf under the ESA and related litigation serve as a useful case study in how regulatory and legal challenges have shaped FWS's interpretation and application of key terms when listing and delisting species under the Act.

The challenges continued after the report was published. As reported in The Guardian (March 3, 2021):

Hunters and trappers in Wisconsin killed 216 gray wolves last week during the state's 2021 wolf hunting season – more than 82% above the authorities' stated quota, sparking uproar among animal-lovers and conservationists, according to reports. The kills all took place in less than 60 hours, quickly exceeding Wisconsin's statewide stated limit of 119 animals. As a result, Wisconsin's department of natural resources ended the season, which was scheduled to span one week, four days early.

In February 2022, the district court vacated and remanded the 2020 delisting rule. That decision reinstated the federal protections that were in place prior to the effective date of the 2020 delisting rule. Gray wolves were thus once again listed as threatened in Minnesota and endangered in all or portions of 44 U.S. states and Mexico. The regional exception where delisting was maintained spanned the 5 states where the Northern Rocky Mountain wolf population had established.

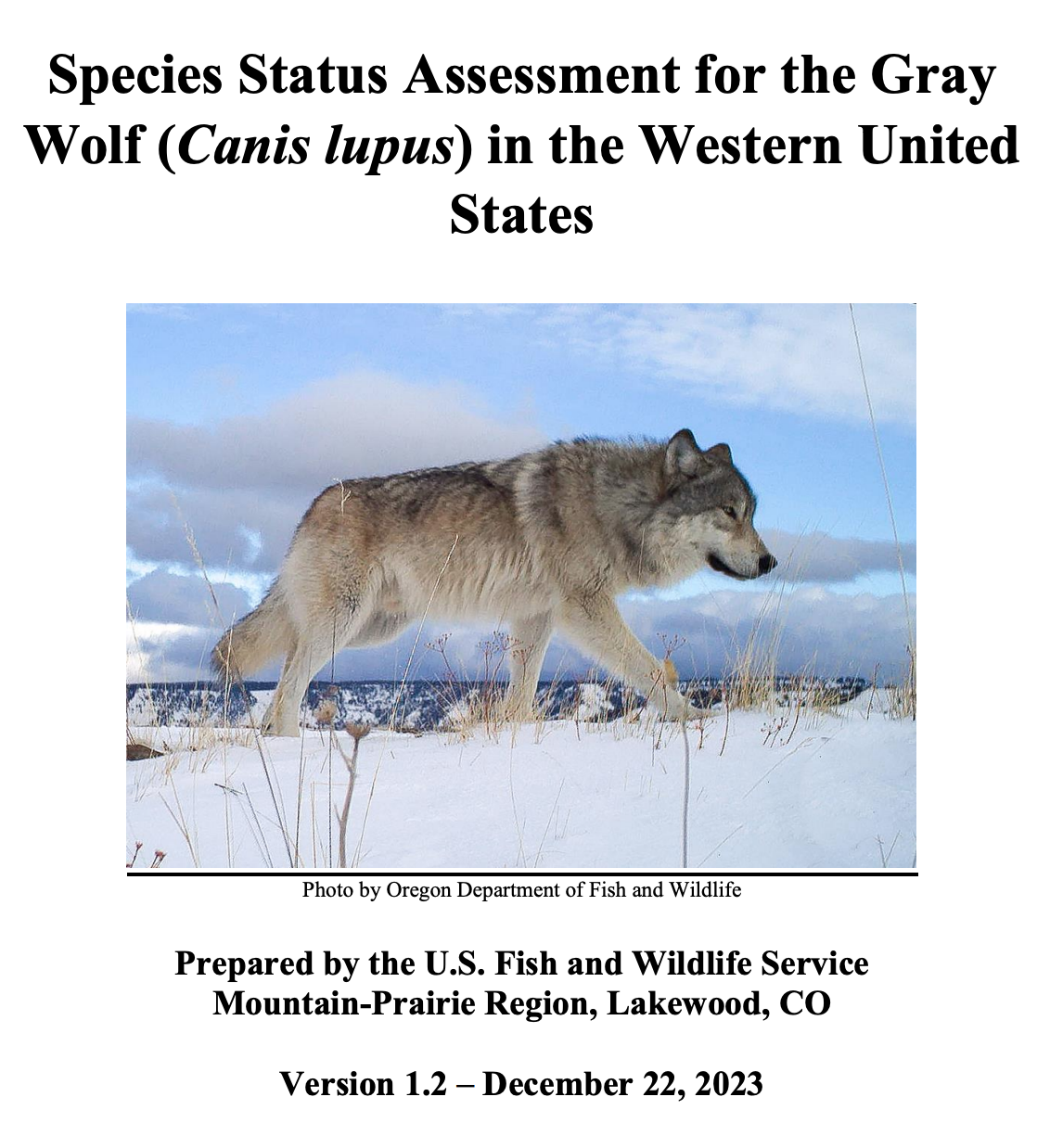
"Species Status Assessment" for the Gray wolf in 2023.

The agency once again went to work on updating the Species Status Assessment Report, and creating a formal listing document plus a recovery plan. This culminated in its posting in November 2023 in the Federal Register a rulemaking titled "Reinstatement of Endangered Species Act Protections for the Gray Wolf (Canis Lupus) in Compliance with Court Order." More details and justification were set forth in the agency's posting in February 2024 of a Species Status Review for the gray wolf. It simultaneously announced the beginning of a new process for what it called a "National Recovery Plan" and explained:

Debate over the management of wolves has included more than two decades of legislation, litigation and rulemaking. Wolf recovery to date has been construed around specific legal questions or science-driven exercises about predicted wolf population status. Courts have invalidated five out of six rules finalized by the Service on gray wolf status, citing at least in part a failure to consider how delisting any particular population of gray wolves affects their status and recovery nationwide.

In May 2024, the U.S. House of Representatives passed a bill to delist the wolf that would override any decision by the agency. The Senate did not follow through. Meanwhile the Nez Perce Tribe has been cooperating with federal authorities in wolf reintroduction on its own tribal lands in Idaho since the 1990s. The tribe maintains a webpage titled, "The Homecoming of Hîmiin: A Long Time Coming," and thus expresses a welcoming attitude unusual in the Rocky Mountain states:

Ultimately, our efforts to restore the gray wolf to the Nez Perce homeland and his rightful place in Nez Perce culture have been a resounding success. Today, many hundreds of wolves live within the Tribe's homeland in Idaho, Washington, and Oregon. As the management of wolves shifts to state agencies, the Tribe continues to track population trends and engage regional partners to ensure the continued health and prosperity of hîmiin in our homeland.

The Nez Perce Tribe is not unusual in its respectful relationship to the wolf. The 2023 species status assessment published by the federal government includes an appendix titled, "Indigenous Knowledge and Cultural Significance of the Gray Wolf to Tribal Nations with Lands in Idaho, Montana, and Wyoming." Traditional ecological knowledge and cultural values of nine tribes are summarized in that appendix.

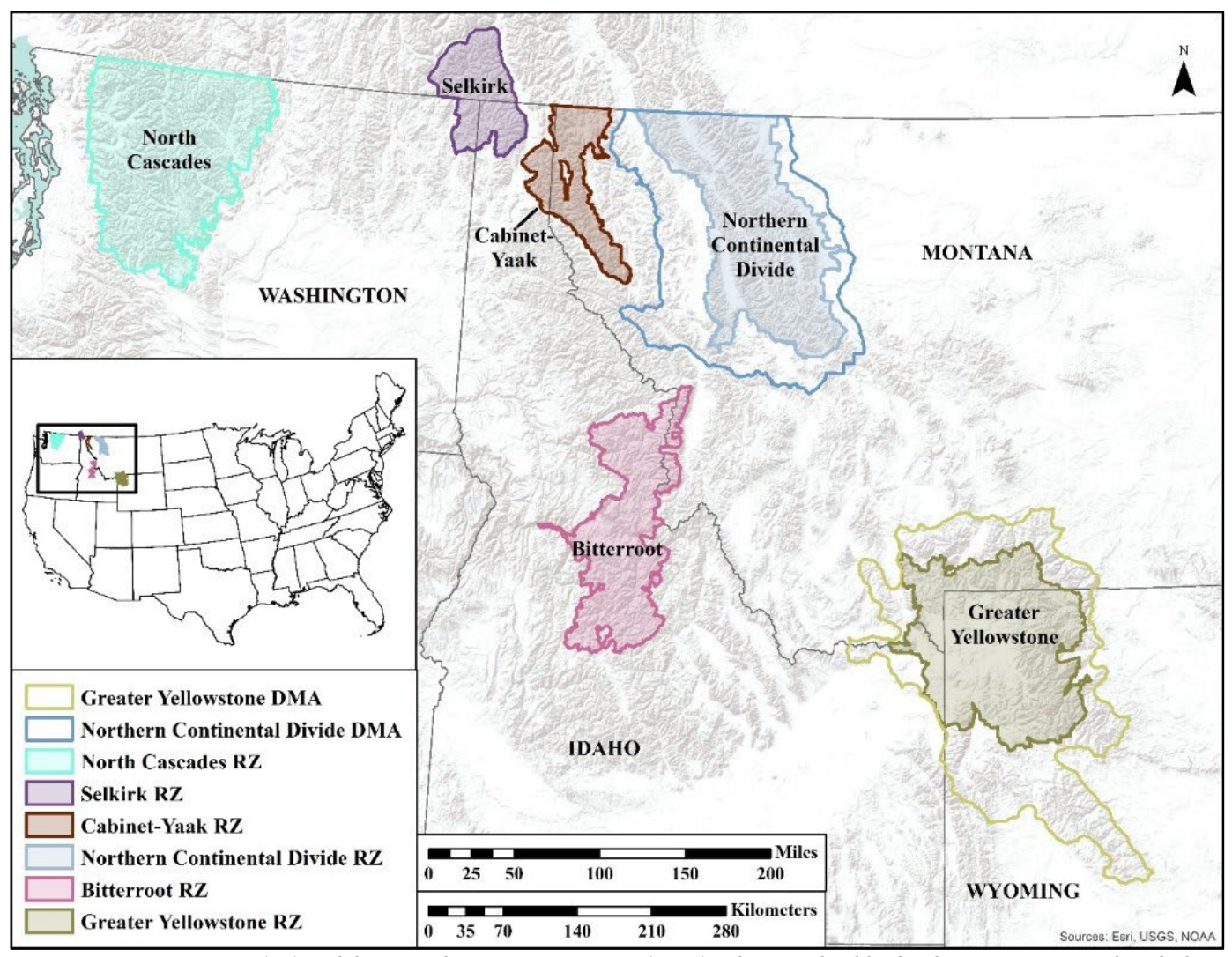
Grizzly bear management in 6 populations.

Another large predator species that has been fraught with ESA listing controversy for many years are the populations of grizzly bear outside of Alaska. The grizzly, too, has a "species status assessment" prepared by the federal government. Here, too, the Nez Perce Tribe is reported as prohibiting grizzly hunting on tribal lands. The 398-page federal report does not, however, include any mention of traditional ecological knowledge pertaining to the bear.

As of July 2025 all grizzly populations are still listed as "threatened." It is therefore "illegal to harm, harass or kill these bears, except in cases of self-defense or the defense of others." The FWS explains that "Grizzly bear conservation is complex and only made possible through a variety of partnerships with the Interagency Grizzly Bear Committee, state wildlife agencies, Native American Tribes, federal agencies, universities and other organizations." If and when delisting of any of the 6 distinct populations were to occur, the relevant state governments would be in charge of authorizing and regulating recreational hunting, except on tribal properties.

=== Reversals in policy track presidential elections ===
In October 2019, at the urging of the Pacific Legal Foundation and the Property and Environment Research Center, the USFWS and the NMFS under President Donald Trump changed the §4(d) rule to treat "threatened" and "critically endangered" species differently (in accordance with the statutory default, which does not prohibit take of threatened species absent a special rule justifying extension of this prohibition). This action legalized and encouraged private recovery initiatives on habitats for species that are merely "threatened."

Environmental opponents criticized the revision as "crashing like a bulldozer" through the act and "tipping the scales way in favor of industry." Some critics, including the Sierra Club, pointed out that these changes came just months after the IPBES released its Global Assessment Report on Biodiversity and Ecosystem Services, which found that human activity had pushed a million species of flora and fauna to the brink of extinction, and would only serve to exacerbate the crisis. The California legislature passed a bill to raise California regulations to thwart the Trump administration changes; it was vetoed by Governor Newsom. In January 2020, the House Natural Resources Committee reported similar legislation. In December 2020, the Trump administration further rolled back the Endangered Species Act by reducing habitat protections for at-risk species, and thus restricting protections to where they currently live—not where they lived previously or where they might migrate to as a result of climate change.

In June 2021, the Biden administration said it was reviewing the Trump era Endangered Species Act regulations and planned to reverse or revise some of the changes, in particular those relating to critical habitat regulations. After a panel of the Ninth Circuit Court of Appeals disallowed an initial attempt to immediately reverse these regulations in 2022, the Biden administration embarked on a rulemaking, and a series of less dramatic revisions were finalized in May 2024. A critic commented, "It seems to be one of those rules/regulations/things going on in Washington D.C. that like to flip-flop with each administration while seeing no actual finality." A December 2024 news article puts the history of presidential election impacts on ESA administration in the context of a second term for Donald Trump. July 2026, following the required draft and comment phases, regulatory revisions similar to first term changes were posted by the Trump administration.

This regulatory flip-flop was not without precedent. A 2008 law review article reports, "President Obama signaled his desire to reverse the last minute Bush administration rule change that became effective on January 15, 2009, by signing a memorandum directing that the Departments of the Interior and Commerce review the regulations impacting the consultation process, and that the agencies resume the traditional consultation process during the review."

In March 2025 several conservation groups warned that numerous species currently listed could be driven to extinction as a result of the second Trump administration's mass firings of U.S. Fish and Wildlife Service staff, coupled with reconvening of what has come to be called the "God Squad." This cabinet-level committee was authorized in the 1978 amendments to the Act in order to set aside the usual endangered species protocols for fast-tracking the permitting of development projects of national significance. As described in The Guardian:

The squad, officially called the Endangered Species Committee, includes seven federal agency leaders, who, in the rare instances in which a federal action of significant public or economic interest comes into irresolvable conflict with the ESA, each vote on whether the project's benefits outweigh the protected species' wellbeing. If five of the seven votes are in favor of a project proceeding, it moves forward, which could drive species to extinction.

A representative of the group Earthjustice was quoted in the article as charging that the committee "can behave as god and decide what species exist and which don't." One year later, March 2026, the cabinet-level committee met for the first time in more than 30 years. A short notice published by the Yale Journal on Regulation presented four aspects of the decision that were unusual or unprecedented, including:

In the span of 15 minutes, the committee met, voted, and approved an exemption for oil and gas activities in the Gulf of Mexico—activities that the National Marine Fisheries Service determined last year could jeopardize the continued existence of an endangered whale species.... The committee did not act under the normal ESA section 7 exemption process (itself used only three times since its creation in 1978).... But for the first time ever, the committee met to use a different exemption provision, granting an "exemption for national security reasons," resting entirely on "national security findings" from the Secretary of Defense. That action overrides an expert agency's determination about needed protections for endangered species without any factual development, public notice, and reasoned deliberation.

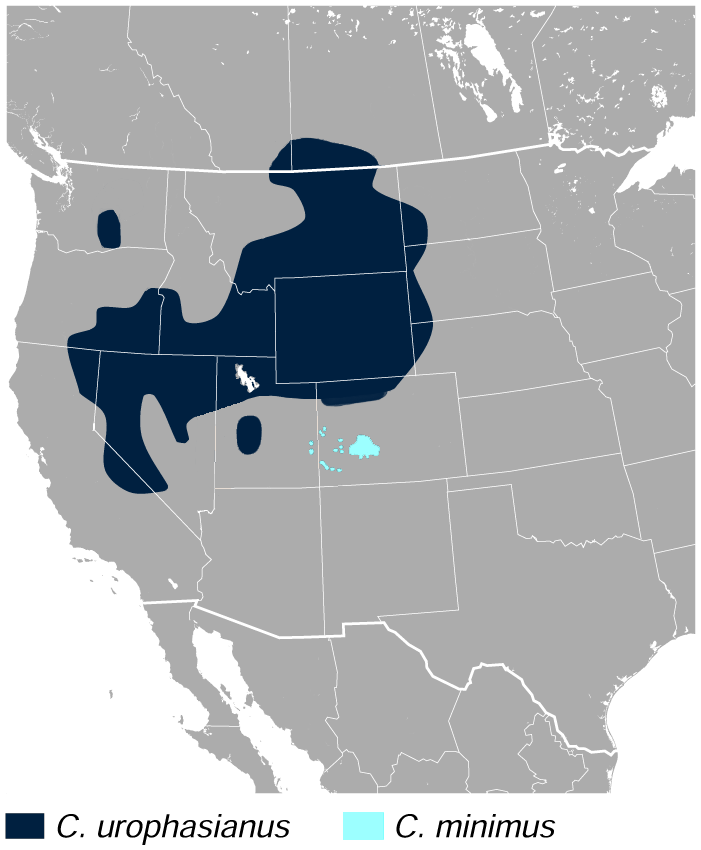
Sage and Gunnison Grouse Centrocercus urophasianus and minimus distribution map

The greater-sage grouse is one declining species for which listing petitions have generated policy responses that flip-flop with presidential (and sometimes Congressional) election results. Because the bird's sagebrush habitat ranges through ten western states and because much of that habitat is within the jurisdiction of the U.S. Bureau of Land Management, the affected states have advocated for collaborative decision-making as a more malleable alternative to federal designation of the grouse as a threatened species. The first petition was submitted during the George W. Bush administration, with policy deliberations carrying into President Obama's time in office during which a court order forced a decision on whether or not to list the bird as threatened. "Warranted but precluded" was the decision in 2010 that effectively pushed decision-making into an undetermined future time. In April 2014, the Sage-Grouse and Endangered Species Conservation and Protection Act (H.R.4419) was passed in the U.S. House of Representatives. This statute prohibited the federal government from listing sage grouse under the Endangered Species Act for 10 years, so long as states prepared and carried out plans to protect the species within their borders. A collaborative plan (without formal listing) was finally signed in 2015. It carried through the first Trump administration and into the Biden administration. A few days after the 2024 election results determined that Donald J. Trump would resume the presidency, the Biden administration offered an updated draft plan. Many national-level environmental groups communicated support for the plan. Several, however, pressed for the outgoing administration to formally list the species as threatened, thereby invoking more environmentally stringent decision-making on resource development proposals on federal lands, especially those administered by the U.S. Department of Interior.

=== Failure to reauthorize the statute ===
Periodic "reauthorization" by Congress of the ESA of 1973 is a statutory requirement to ensure ongoing appropriations. The Act was reauthorized for the first time in 1978 during the presidency of Jimmy Carter. Reauthorization continued in 1982 and 1988 during the presidency of Ronald Reagan. Four years later another vote for renewal was due, but this did not occur. From 1992 on through at least 2024, reauthorization has never again been accomplished.

Mandatory funding for the law therefore expired in 1992. Even so, partisan compromises that come from the necessity to annually pass an overall federal budget have maintained annual appropriations for continuing enforcement of the Act's provisions. As interpreted by the Congressional Research Service,

Because the authorization for appropriations expired in FY1992, it is sometimes said that the ESA is not authorized. However, that does not mean that the agencies lack authority to conduct actions or that prohibitions within the act are no longer enforceable; those statutory provisions would continue to be law even if no money were appropriated.

A 1996 article attributed the inability of the 104th Congress to reauthorize the Act to ongoing polarization that had prevented the 103rd Congress (January 1993 through December 1994) from reauthorizing the Act — even though the Democratic Party had controlled the presidency and both legislative houses during the 103rd. A 2009 law review paper attributed increasing polarization in the "reauthorization debates" partly to the news media having incentives to attract readership by featuring the most dramatic quotations from "divergent narratives" that magnify the divide. As well, interest groups on both sides "shared a perception that the ESA was broken." Because any move to reauthorize the Act would also open the prospect for amendment, "legislative gridlock and risk aversion on all political sides" restrain any serious effort to introduce a reauthorization bill.

=== Using "riders" in annual appropriations bills ===
Opening the Act itself to amendment by Congress has not been achieved in a major way since the amendments of 1988. In December 2024, a substantial set of amendments was approved by the House Committee on Natural Resources, but nothing of similar scope moved through the Senate.

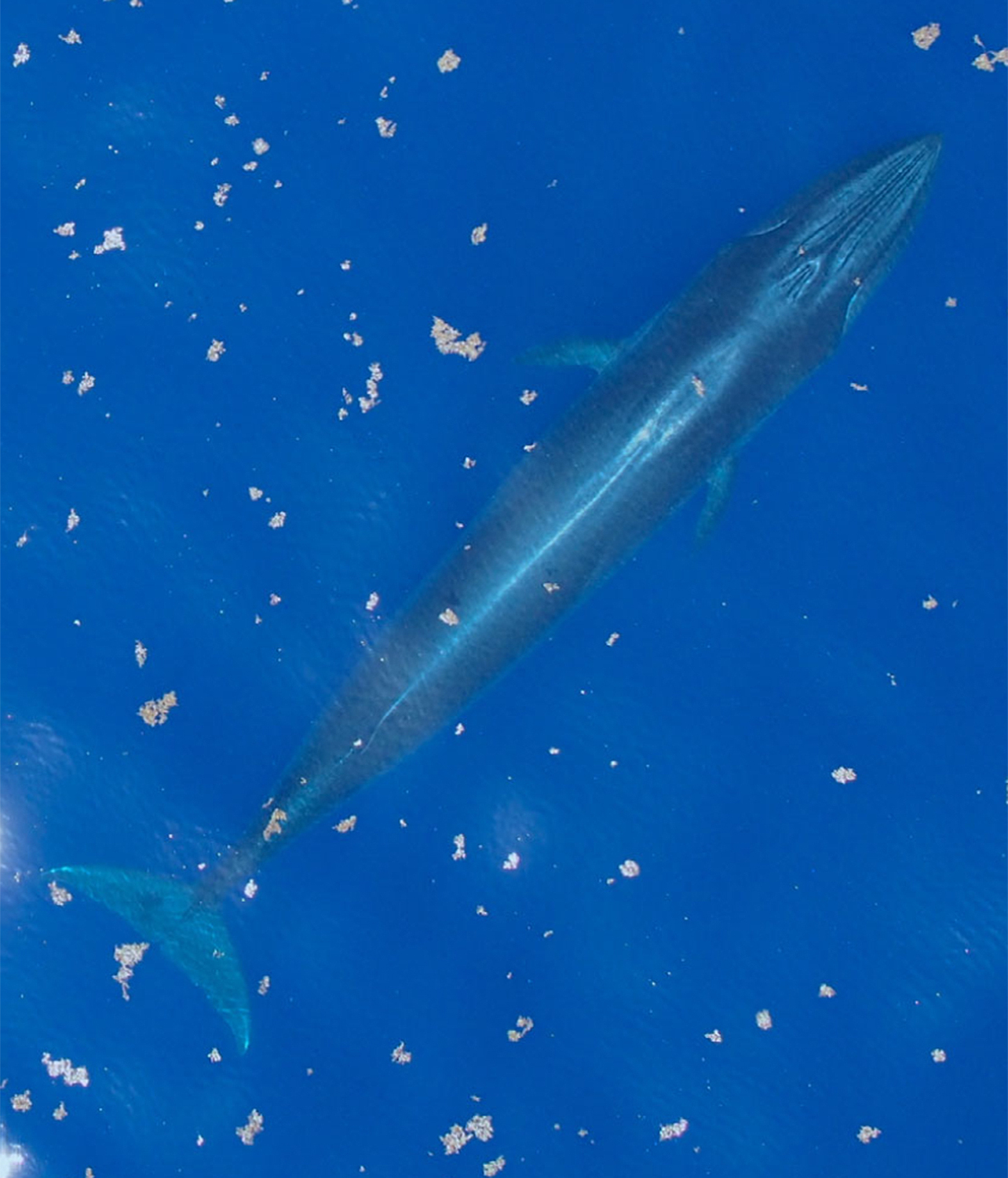
Rice's whale

Nonetheless, Congressional interventions in executive branch implementation are regularly achieved via "riders" inserted into a multi-topic omnibus bill (notably, passage of the annual budget bill). For example, as of February 2025, the Defenders of Wildlife has a webpage titled, "The 118th Congress: Playing Politics with Extinction: 115 Attacks on the ESA." (The 118th Congress convened during the final two years of Joe Biden's presidency.) The group lists, excerpts, and expresses their views on 93 House and 22 Senate bills, sections of bills, amendments, and resolutions. Very few of these moved out of any committee. Most were attempts to block funding, overrule listing or delisting decisions, or alter regulations for just one species at a time. The focal species of failed attempts for inclusion in the March 2024 funding bill included: northern long-eared bat, gray wolf, grizzly bear, North Atlantic right whale, Rice's whale, lesser prairie-chicken, Texas kangaroo rat, Dunes sagebrush lizard, and two mussel species in the Rio Grande watershed. In contrast, "the long-standing rider preventing ESA listing of the greater sage-grouse and the Columbia Basin distinct population segment was retained in the final bill."

=== Allocating funds among listed species ===
The Fish & Wildlife Service has developed a four-factor prioritization system for analyzing tradeoffs in distributing funds among the listed species: degree of threat, potential for recovery, taxonomic uniqueness, and conflict with human activities. Even so, the 2016 special report on the Act by the Ecological Society of America concluded that the agency's decisions on apportioning funds are "more often driven by political and social factors, including congressional representation, the number of employees in field offices, staff workload, and opportunities to form partnerships and secure matching funds." As well, the report stated, "Critics point out that recovery efforts are focused disproportionately on charismatic species, to the detriment of others, particularly plants."

The 1988 amendments to the Act, which instituted the creation of recovery plans, had already directed that the less charismatic kinds of species be treated equally: "The Secretary, in developing and implementing recovery plans, shall, to the maximum extent practicable ... give priority to those endangered species and threatened species, without regard to taxonomic classification, that are most likely to benefit from such plans, particularly those species that are, or may be, in conflict with construction or other development projects or other forms of economic activity."

As to the implementation of existing recovery plans, there is no requirement that federal agencies (or any other institution) implement any of the actions specified in those plans.

=== Cost ===
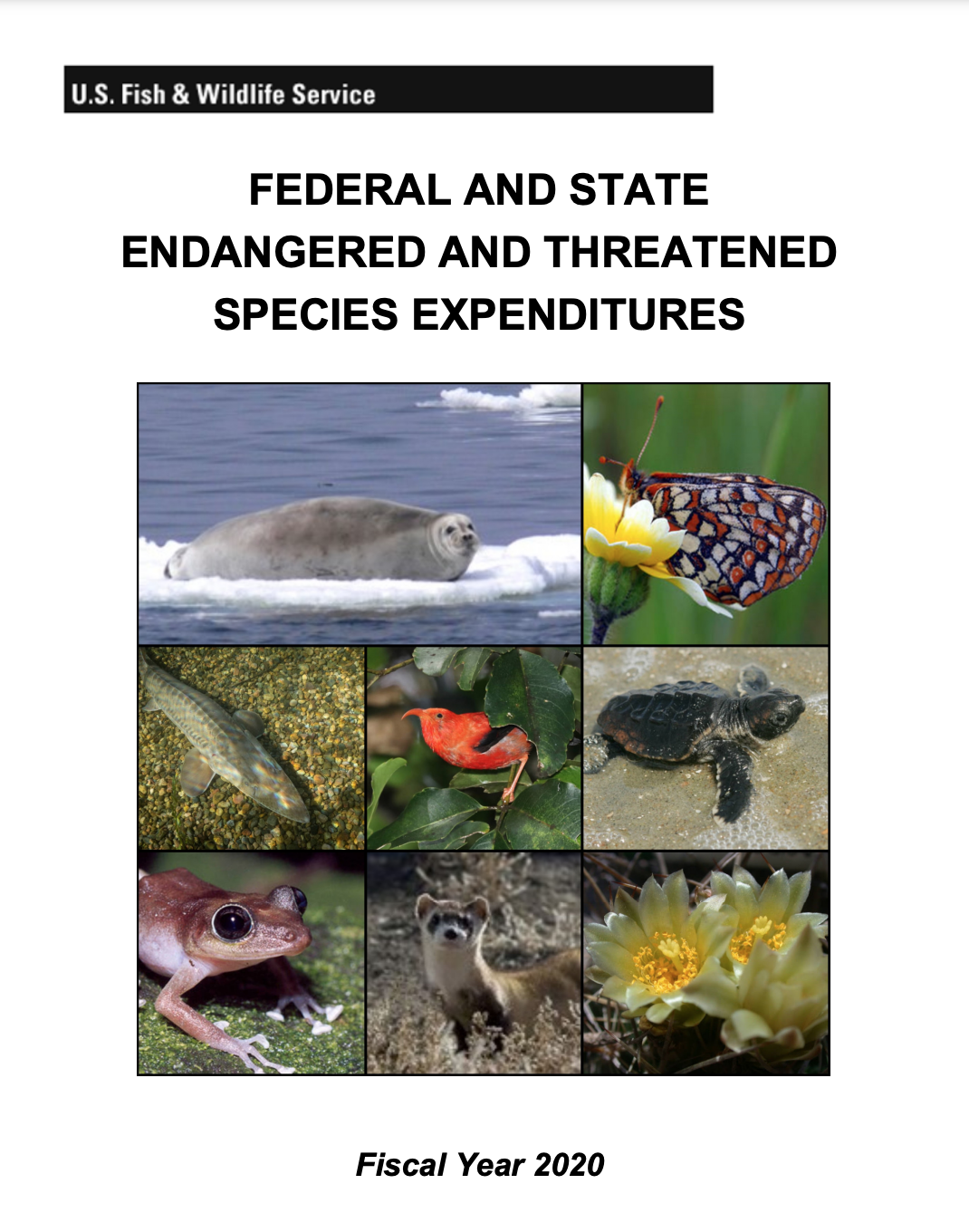
Expenditures report by U.S. Fish and Wildlife Service, fiscal year 2020

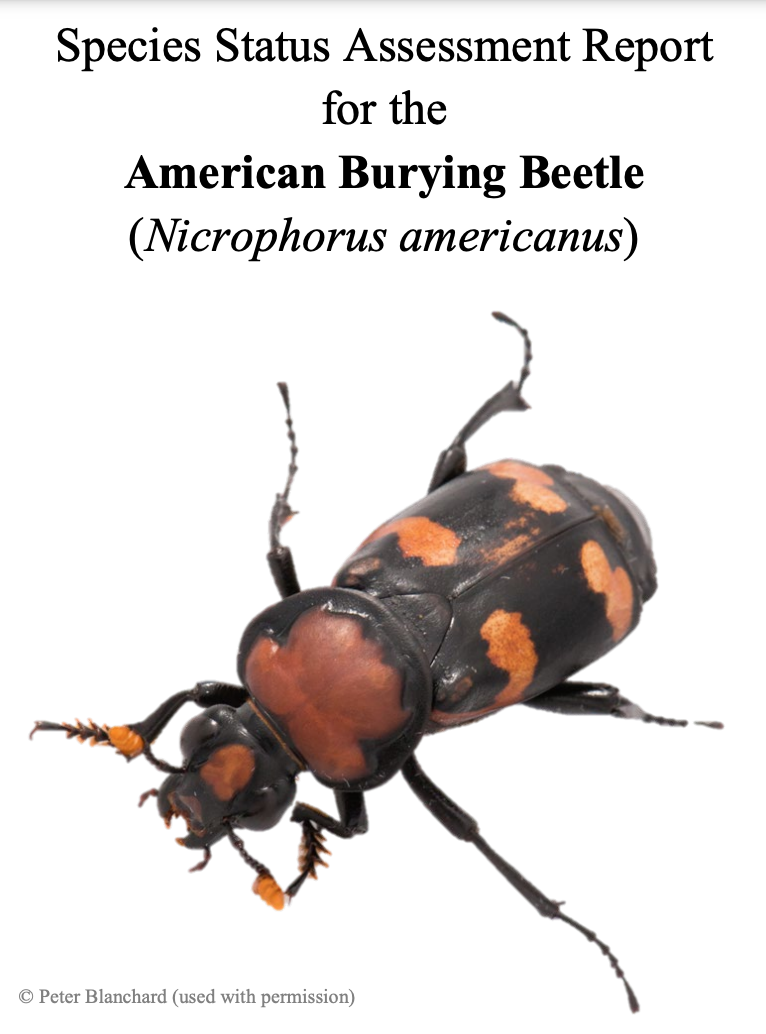
American burying beetle "species status assessment" was published in 2019.

In 1988, the 1973 Act was amended in several ways, including the creation of a new section. Titled, "Annual Cost Analysis by the Fish and Wildlife Service," Section 18 requires that the Secretary of the Interior "shall submit to the Congress an annual report covering the preceding fiscal year." The report is to entail a list "on a species by species basis of all reasonably identifiable" expenditures made by the federal government and additionally by states. As of January 2025, annual reports beginning in 1989 through 2020 are accessible in pdf format via this page on the agency's website: "Endangered and Threatened Species Expenditures Reports."

The 2020 fiscal year report entailed many pages of tabulations. One such list organized the species from the greatest to the least annual expenditures. Chinook Salmon of Puget Sound was at the top of the list: $62 million. All but one of the 26 highest ranked species are fish that live, at least part of their lives, in freshwater habitats. The one exception is also aquatic, but confined to marine waters and thus administered by the National Oceanic and Atmospheric Administration. This is the North Atlantic right whale. A reptile first shows up on the list as species rank 27. It is the desert tortoise, and its recovery actions entailed $8 million in 2020. Next comes the manatee and soon thereafter the first birds: northern spotted owl and red-cockaded woodpecker. Those were also in the $8 million range. The grizzly bear is ranked 46, and it is in the $4 million range. The first insect, Oregon silverspot butterfly is 139th on the list; its 2020 expenses were $737 thousand. The American burying beetle is the next insect, at $673 thousand. Costs escalated for the beetle when "experimental populations" were initiated in new locations beginning in 2011.

The first plant on the list, seagrass, is the 159th highest annual expenditure. It is a keystone species of coastal waters that provides expansive ecosystem services. Following is the American crocodile and California condor. Each of the three species are priced under $600 thousand.

At the opposite end of financial support are species that received the least in 2020. Of the 1,599 domestic threatened and endangered species ranked in the long series of tables, 668 species were each allocated less than $10,000. One plant, one fish, and one snail were in the lowest rank; each was managed with $100.

Cumulative expenditures in fiscal year 2020 for all 1,599 species were also calculated. The total came to $1,083,913,007. This compares to the 2018 fiscal year budget total of $1,269,621,055. The reporting framework differs from year to year. In 2018, the federal government cost for acquiring lands as critical habitat totaled $105,469,496, of which 45% came from the FWS agency budget and the rest from other federal sources. Land acquisition expenditures, which may primarily come from the federal Land and Water Conservation Fund, were not included in the 2020 report.

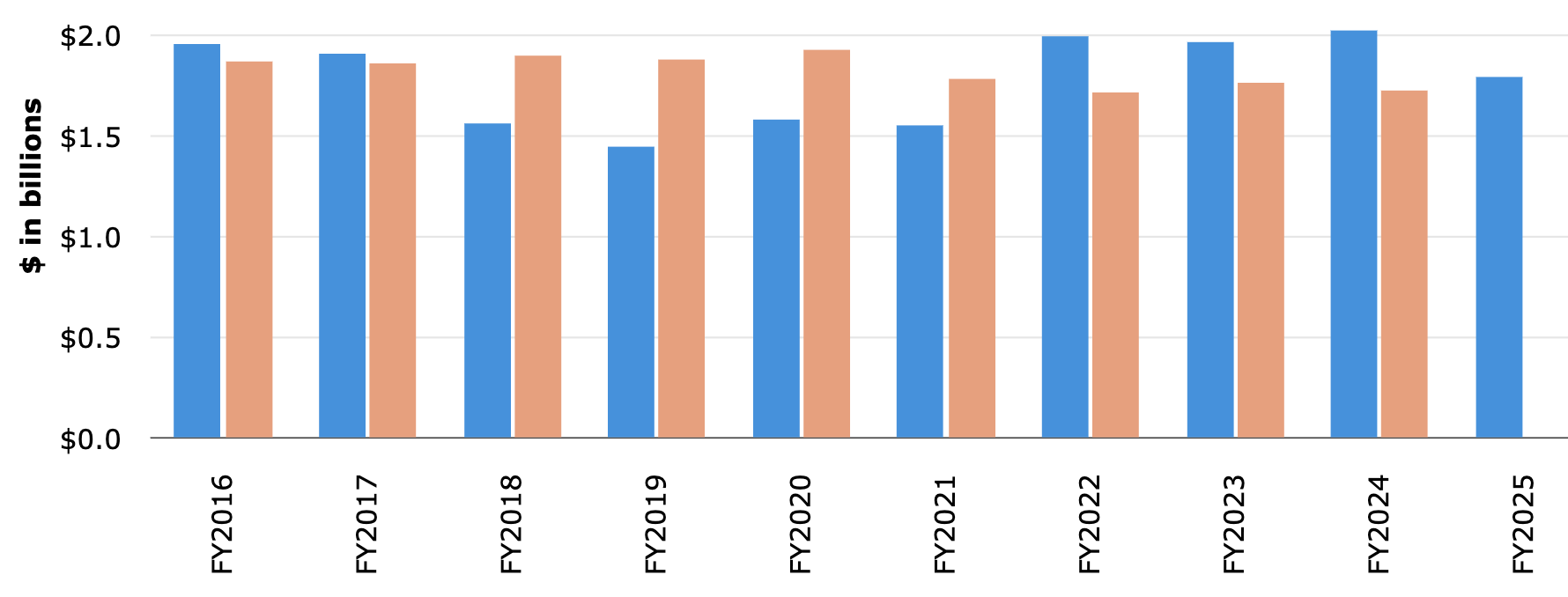
"U.S. Fish and Wildlife Service: FY2025 Appropriations" (requested BLUE; enacted ORANGE), Congressional Research Service report.

Short reports on agency requests for FY appropriations and Congressional deliberations thereof are available for more recent years than the set of lengthy annual reports that documented actual agency expenditures from FY 1989 through 2020. For example, there is an online public narrative of the FY 2024 FWS request (with comparisons to 2022 and 2023). The Congressional Research Service posted a short analysis of same. For FY 2024, there is also a lengthy report itemizing costs and requests for more than a dozen programs internal to FWS, but the endangered species program is not delineated among those programs, and there is no species-by-species accounting as had been the norm through 2020.

In 2026, the Congressional Research Service published a report titled, "Appropriations for Implementation of the Endangered Species Act Since FY2017." This report surveys the complexities, challenges, and ongoing Congressional debates about appropriate levels for agency staff funding and for programs that Congress established for ESA-related land acquisition, habitat restoration, and grant funding to states via the Cooperative Endangered Species Conservation Fund (CESCF) appropriations account.

=== Delisting is not always defunding ===
The ESA of 1973 is implemented in ways such that each recovery plan includes a threshold population number at which a particular species could be regarded as "recovered." However, there is also a statutory requirement that delisting occurs only if the population threshold can be expected to maintain over "the foreseeable future," given the existing laws and regulations operative outside of the Endangered Species Act.

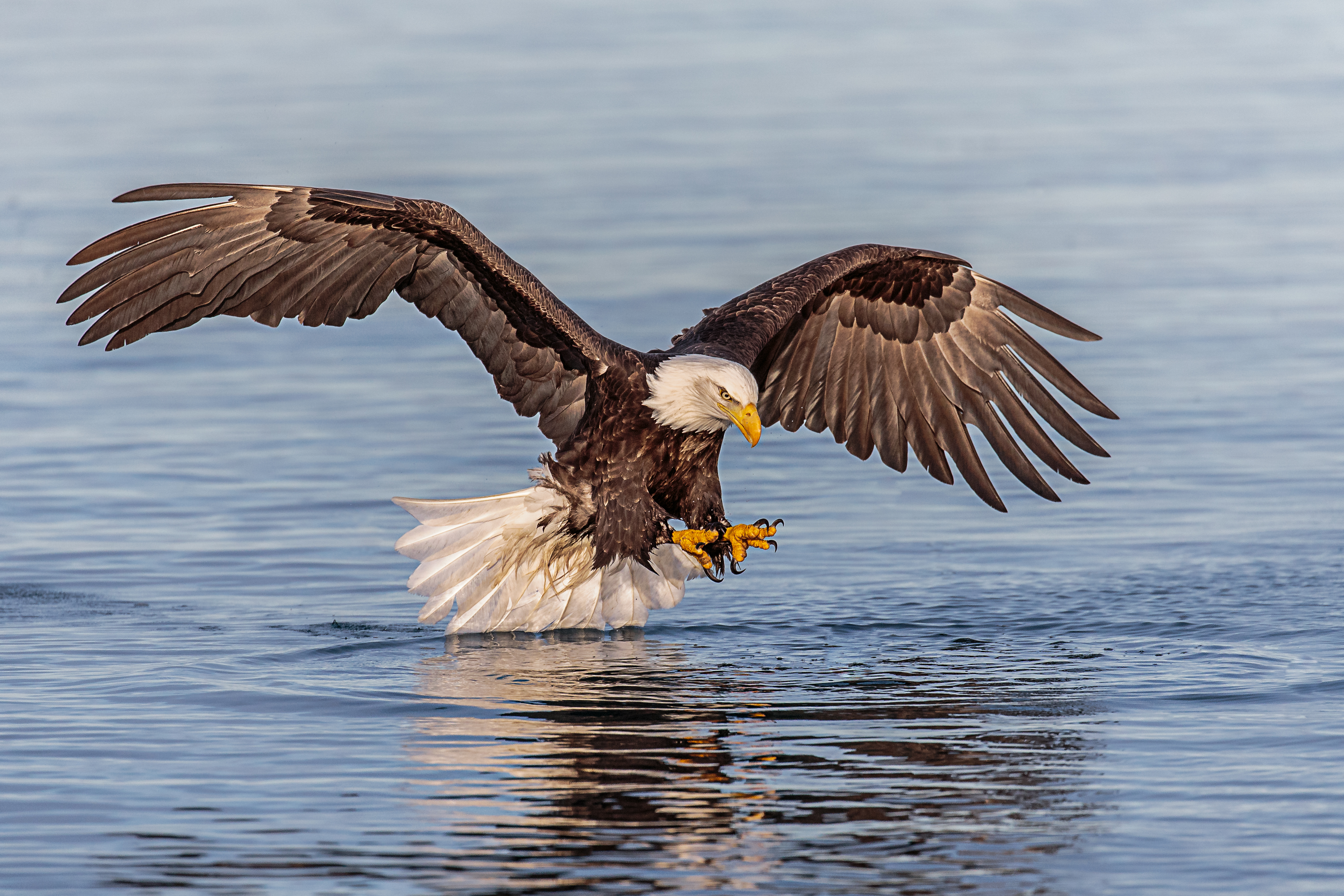
Bald eagle fishing

A notable example happened in 1994 when the eastern North Pacific population of gray whale (which ranges along the west coast of North America) was delisted. Its population had reached the recovery threshold, and henceforth the Marine Mammal Protection Act of 1972 was regarded as sufficient for maintaining that recovery into the future. This also applied to delisting of the bald eagle in 2007, because DDT had been banned by the Environmental Protection Agency in 1972 and the Bald Eagle Protection Act had made killing of the bird illegal since 1940.

What about species for whom active management had played a large role in bringing population numbers up to the recovery threshold, yet the threats that had been repelled by such management showed no prospect of going away? In 2005 these kinds of species were labelled as conservation-reliant species. Accordingly, they would also be funding reliant — but not necessarily dependent on U.S. Fish and Wildlife funding, nor possibly any other federal agency. Instead, state agencies and sometimes non-governmental organizations would commit to maintaining the requisite conservation actions.

A 2010 journal article outlined the kinds of management actions that might be necessary for the full range of conservation-reliant species well into the future:

"Efforts may be focused on managing other species that negatively affect the conservation target (e.g., control of predators, nest parasites, competitors, disease vectors), actively managing habitat and ecological processes (e.g., prescribed cuts, prescribed burns, controlled releases of water from dams), supplementing resources (e.g., providing contaminant-free food for California condors, Gymnogyps californianus), controlling direct human impacts (e.g., excluding people from a least tern colony), or artificial recruitment (e.g., supplementing populations through release of captive-reared individuals or translocation from another site to maintain genetic diversity or augment population numbers)."

The authors concluded that "the challenge created by the conservation reliance of threatened and endangered species is formidable." This was based on a survey they conducted of the 1,361 existing recovery plans. Of these, 951 (84%) were deemed "conservation reliant by our measures." A 2021 law review article surveying the topic of conservation-reliant species forecast that "the overwhelming majority of species will never be delisted without some type of commitment to ongoing management."

By 2014, both the U.S. Fish and Wildlife Service and the National Marine Fisheries Service had begun using the concept of "conservation reliance" when planning and reporting efforts to recover and delist species. The statutory requirement for ensuring ongoing management by other institutions was achieved by securing management agreements with state governmental and also private entities (such as conservation organizations and conservation land trusts).

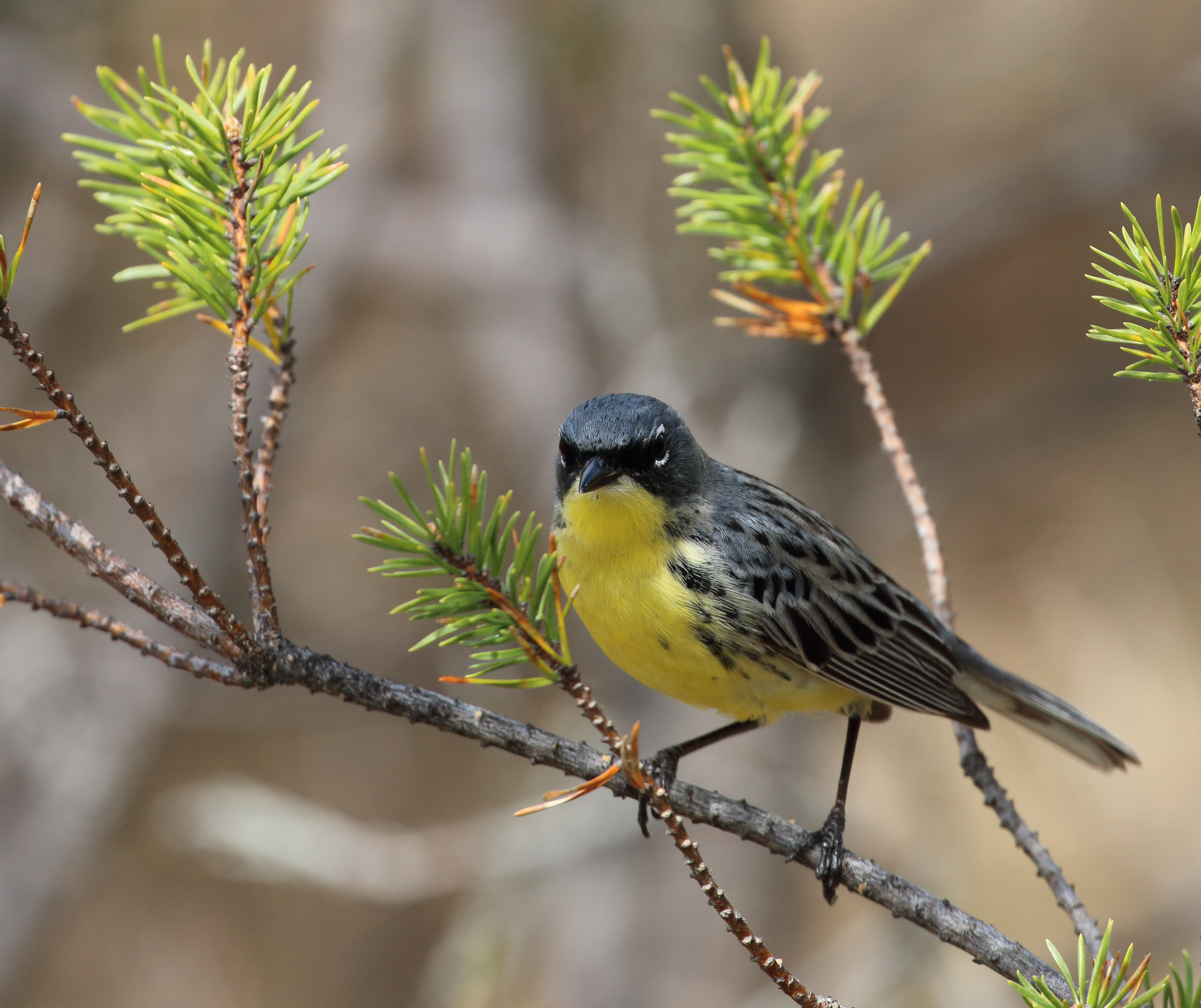
Kirtland's warbler on jack pine

An example well-known for the number of institutions agreeing to bear responsibilities for continuing conservation actions pertains to the 2019 delisting of the Kirtland's warbler. Designated as "endangered" in 1972 via the 1969 version of the endangered species statute, the warbler had dipped in population as low as 200 breeding pairs. The initial recovery plan, as required by the 1973 statute, was published in 1976 and set a recovery goal of 1,000 breeding pairs. By then the science was clear as to what had been challenging the species for decades. One threat was habitat loss and the other was another species of bird.

Habitat loss is attributed to human interventions that severely reduced the scale and repetition of forest fires in the pine-rich ecosystems of northern Michigan. Kirtland's warblers will nest only in open woodlands dominated by jack pine, and only in the southernmost portion of the tree's otherwise vast range spanning far into Canada. But jack pine is an early successional species, and this means that canopy dominants, such as red pine, will eventually shade them out. And not just any jack pine can attract these birds to nest. There needs to be many of them, scaling to no less than several hundred acres of near monoculture. Worse, prime habitat is naturally ephemeral. Kirtland's warblers will nest only on the ground, and thus the protective trees have to be young enough (6 to 20 years old) for the lower branches to fully camouflage their chosen sites. Periodic fires are their natural ally. But civilization cannot tolerate fires running rampant.

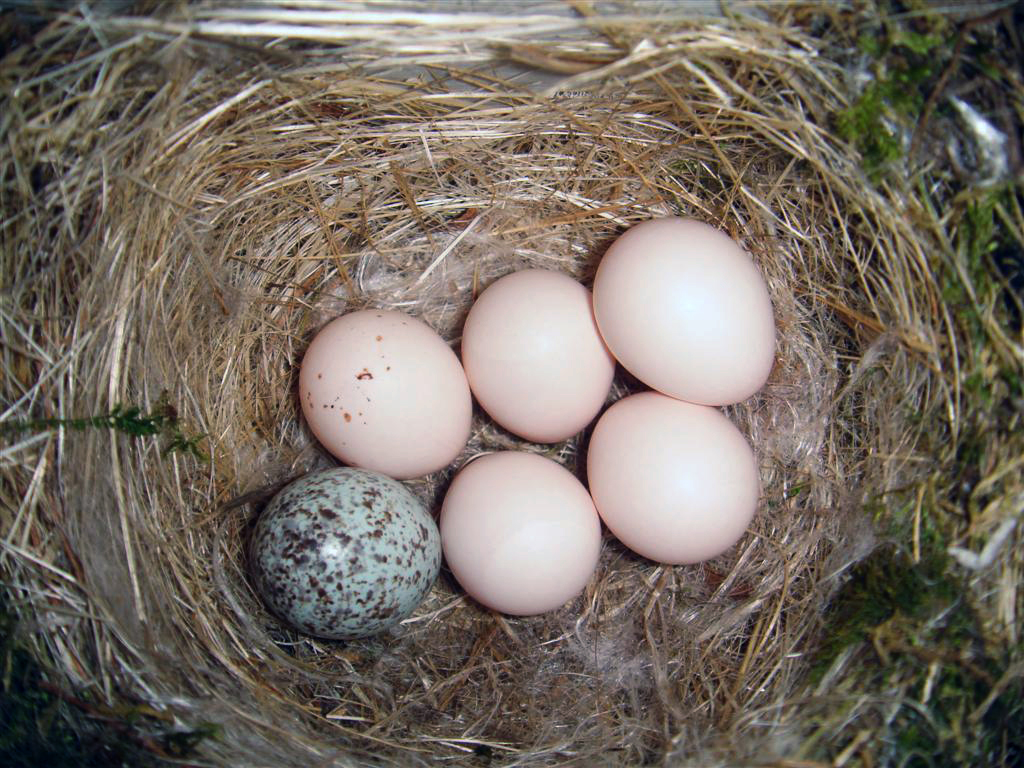
Egg of a brown-headed cowbird parasitizing the nest of an eastern phoebe.

The species of bird that poses an equal threat was native to the prairie states — not the forests of Michigan. This is the brown-headed cowbird, which had evolved a clever way to raise its young while harvesting insects lofted by roaming herds of bison. They had become brood parasites, laying their eggs in the nests of other bird species. But the bison are gone, and cattle and farm fields have replaced much of the forest in Michigan. The cowbirds easily adapted to this new landscape, laying their eggs deliberately in the nests of smaller-bodied birds. Cowbird hatchlings are much bigger than the rightful occupants of the nest, easily pushing them out and also reaching higher to snatch food from the bills of the foster parents.

Active, ongoing management is thus unavoidable. Controlled burns or jack pine harvests need to be repeated throughout the dedicated and acquired habitat. Cowbirds must be trapped and killed. As of 2025, the parties collaborating in these and other efforts are called the Kirtland's Warbler Conservation Team. At the time of delisting (2019), team members were drawn from three federal agencies (U.S. Fish and Wildlife Service, U.S. Forest Service, and U.S. Department of Agriculture), from the state natural resources departments of Michigan and Wisconsin, from the Canadian Wildlife Service, and from two established conservation organizations (The Nature Conservancy and Huron Pines).

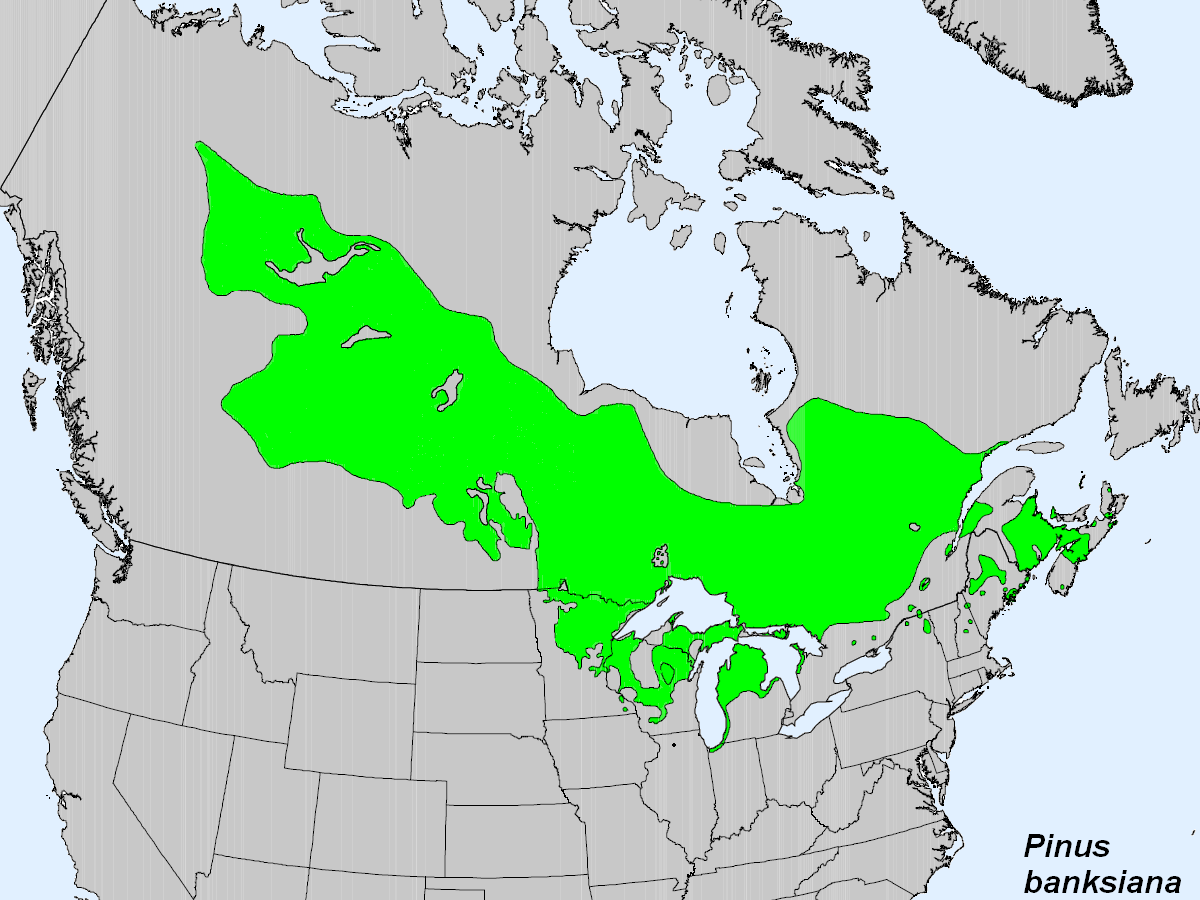
Range map of jack pine, Pinus banksiana

Federal expenditures leading up to delisting peaked in 2018, with $432,000 having been expended that year. More than half of the budget was attributed to the U.S. Forest Service, with the U.S. Fish and Wildlife Service second, and smaller investments made by the U.S. Geological Survey, the Army Corps of Engineers, and the Department of Agriculture's Animal and Plant Health Inspection Service. States contributed $56,000 that year. No expenditures were attributed to the Fish and Wildlife Service in 2020, but a total of $27,000 federal dollars were expended by other agencies, mostly the U.S. Forest Service (on whose lands active management continues).

The devolution of endangered species protection from the primacy of federal government powers and obligations back to the states via cooperative agreements (as in the case of Kirtland's warbler in 2019) or via preemptive state action (as in the case of California's species of Joshua Tree in 2023) was summarized in a 2017 law review article by John Copeland Nagle. Published during the first Trump administration, the author wrote:

There are many reasons why states should play a greater role under the ESA. Cooperative federalism is the norm in federal environmental statutes, and it is conspicuous by its absence in the ESA. A revived state role has numerous advantages. State environmental regulation has become quite attractive to many environmentalists at the onset of the Trump Administration. The Western Governors Association (WGA) has prioritized reforming the ESA in order to better achieve the statute's goals while better respecting state authorities and interests. The theoretical justification has been there all along. The doctrine of subsidiarity, which emerged from Catholic social thought and now plays a key role in the governance of the European Union, seeks to empower local and state authorities but is willing to rely on federal power if the states prove to be inadequate.

=== Chronological list of species controversies ===
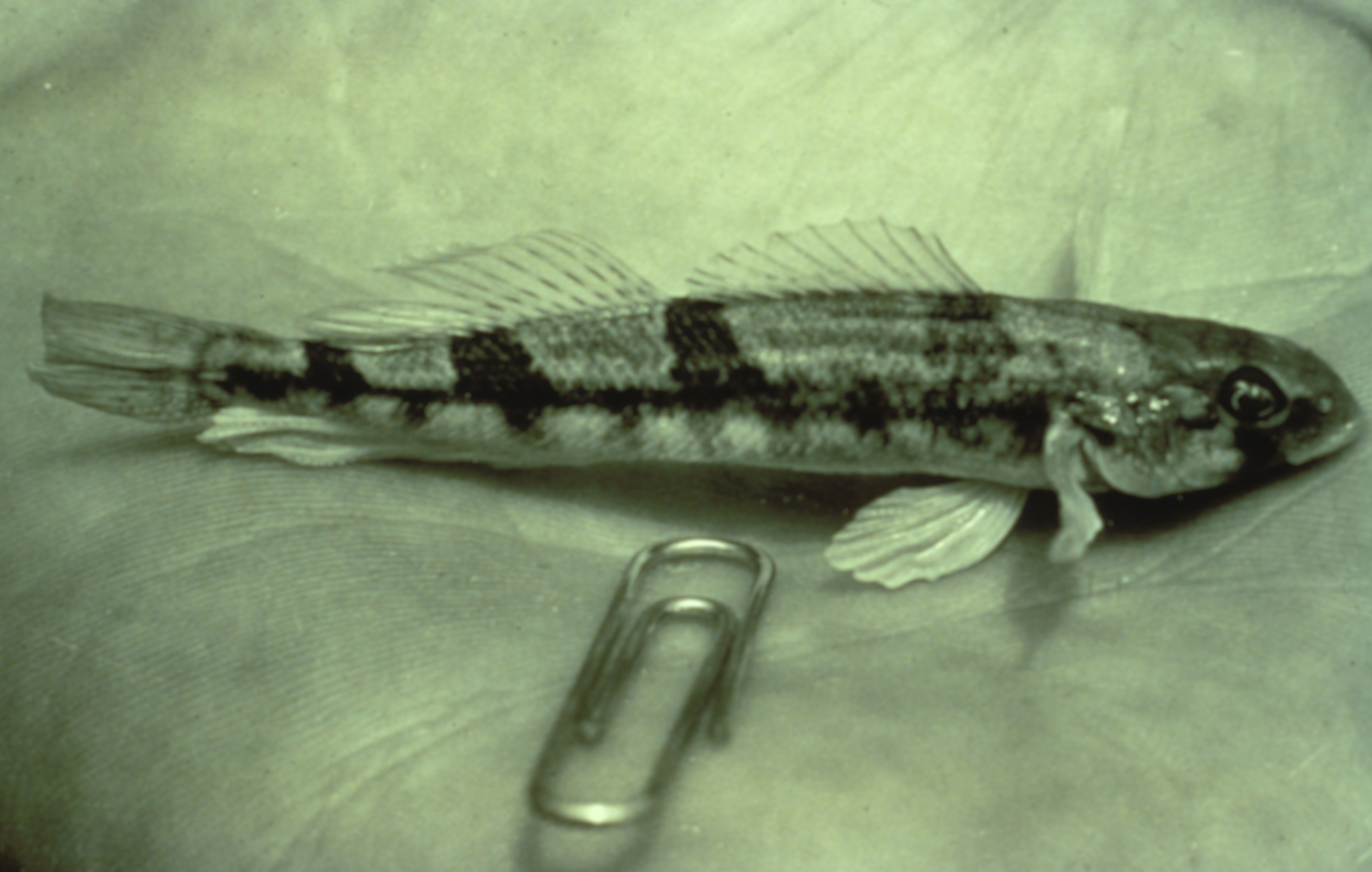
Snail darter

In 1978, a small species of fish in the southeastern USA was listed as endangered. A conflict arose because a dam was already under construction within its native range and was scientifically deemed as damaging to its necessary habitat. What came to be known as the snail darter controversy gained national attention. A U.S. Supreme Court ruling prohibited dam completion, which was then overridden when Congress exempted the Tellico Dam from provisions of the ESA. Subsequently, more populations of the species were discovered in rivers other than the Little Tennessee River where the dam was constructed, and in 2022 the species was removed from the federal endangered list. Nonetheless, the fact that the Endangered Species Act effectively halted major construction underway in behalf of a small species of fish put an end to the wide political support that had accompanied passage of the Act.

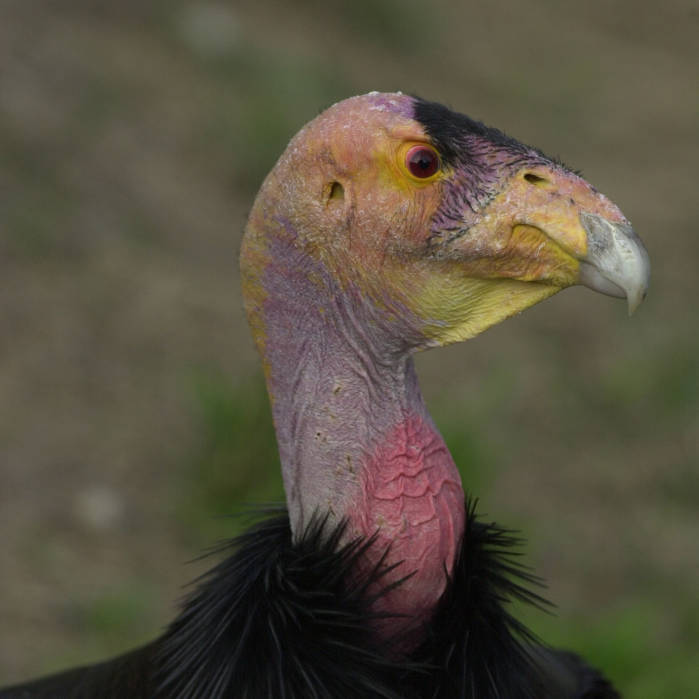
California condor

In 1982, despite protests from some environmental organizations, the recovery plan for the endangered California condor began implementing the capture of all 22 wild birds that remained. By the early 1990s, the captive breeding effort was successful enough to begin returning some of the progeny to the wild—including the Grand Canyon from which this carrion-feeding bird had been missing for at least several centuries. In 2001 the first wild nesting was recorded in the Grand Canyon. As of 2022, the species had a wild population of 350 individuals and a captive population of 214.

In 1987 an extirpated eastern relative of the gray wolf was reintroduced into North Carolina following more than a decade of captive breeding. Controversy accelerated when the state wildlife agency liberalized hunting regulations for coyotes. Because the endangered red wolf resembles its coyote relative far more than the larger gray wolf does, the number of mistaken shootings of the endangered species began to seriously impact the population. As well, detractors of red wolf protection pointed to the genetic deterioration of later generations of red wolves in the wild, as they easily interbreed with coyotes.

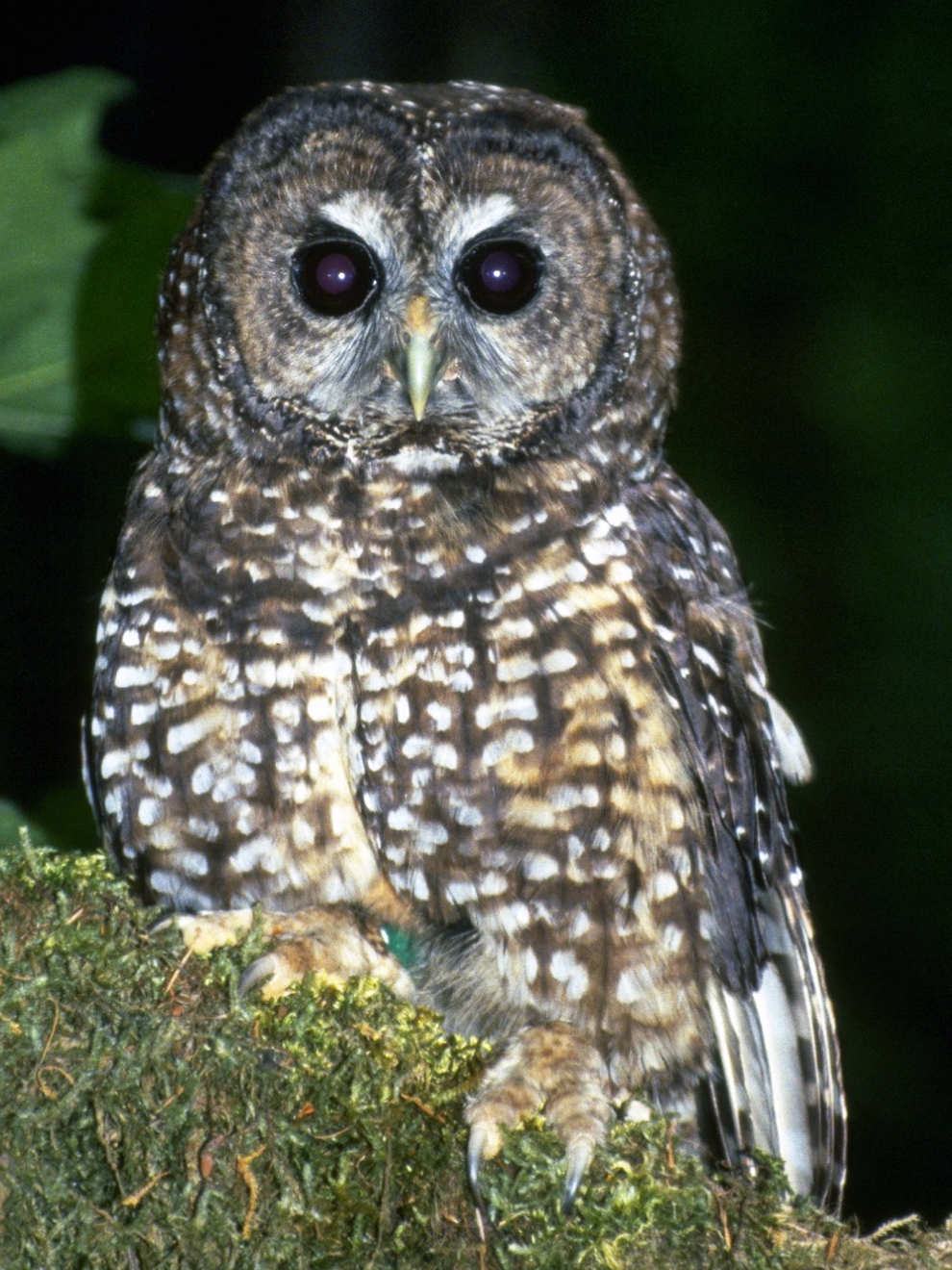
Northern spotted owl

In 1988 another controversy arose that drew national attention, when the Northern spotted owl was listed as endangered. This species depended on intact and mature coastal forests in the states of Washington, Oregon, and California. And this, in turn, posed new restrictions on logging of national forest lands in those regions—which devastated local economies in small logging towns across the Pacific northwest. Not until 1994 did adoption by the federal government of the Northwest Forest Plan, along with a community financial aid packet, bring a close to peak hostilities between loggers and those defending owl habitat. Preventing human destruction of habitat did not, however, result in species recovery. Natural immigration of a bigger and more aggressive owl species (the barred owl) that was formerly native only to the eastern states became a major cause of continuing population decline of the spotted owl. The government's decision to employ sharpshooters to cull the barred owl population presents a challenging ethical issue within conservation thinking.

Another ESA controversy erupted in the 1990s when the gray wolf (listed as endangered in the Lower 48 states in 1974) and the Mexican wolf (listed as endangered in 1976) were reintroduced into core areas of their former native ranges. Because wolves are so wide-ranging and can be expected to occasionally prey upon livestock that ranchers legally graze on federal (even wilderness) lands, announcements of intents to restore these predators to particular federal lands in the Rocky Mountain states generated conflicting views at the outset. Ever after, state authority to manage roaming wolves (and authorize takings and hunts) has been controversial, as well.

Climate change became a legally validated extinction risk when the polar bear secured a listing as "threatened" in 2010. This was the culmination of five years of contention, beginning in 2005 when the Center for Biological Diversity filed a petition to list the bear as threatened, attributed to data on Arctic sea ice decline already underway. The Fish and Wildlife Service did not respond to the petition in a timely fashion, resulting in a lawsuit, which in turn prompted an out-of-court settlement that had the agency list the polar bear as threatened in 2008. This time it was the state of Alaska and industry groups that litigated. The D.C. district court upheld the listing decision, which prompted the plaintiffs to seek an appeals court ruling. Again the agency listing decision was upheld, based in part on the reasonableness of the agency using "widely accepted" climate models.

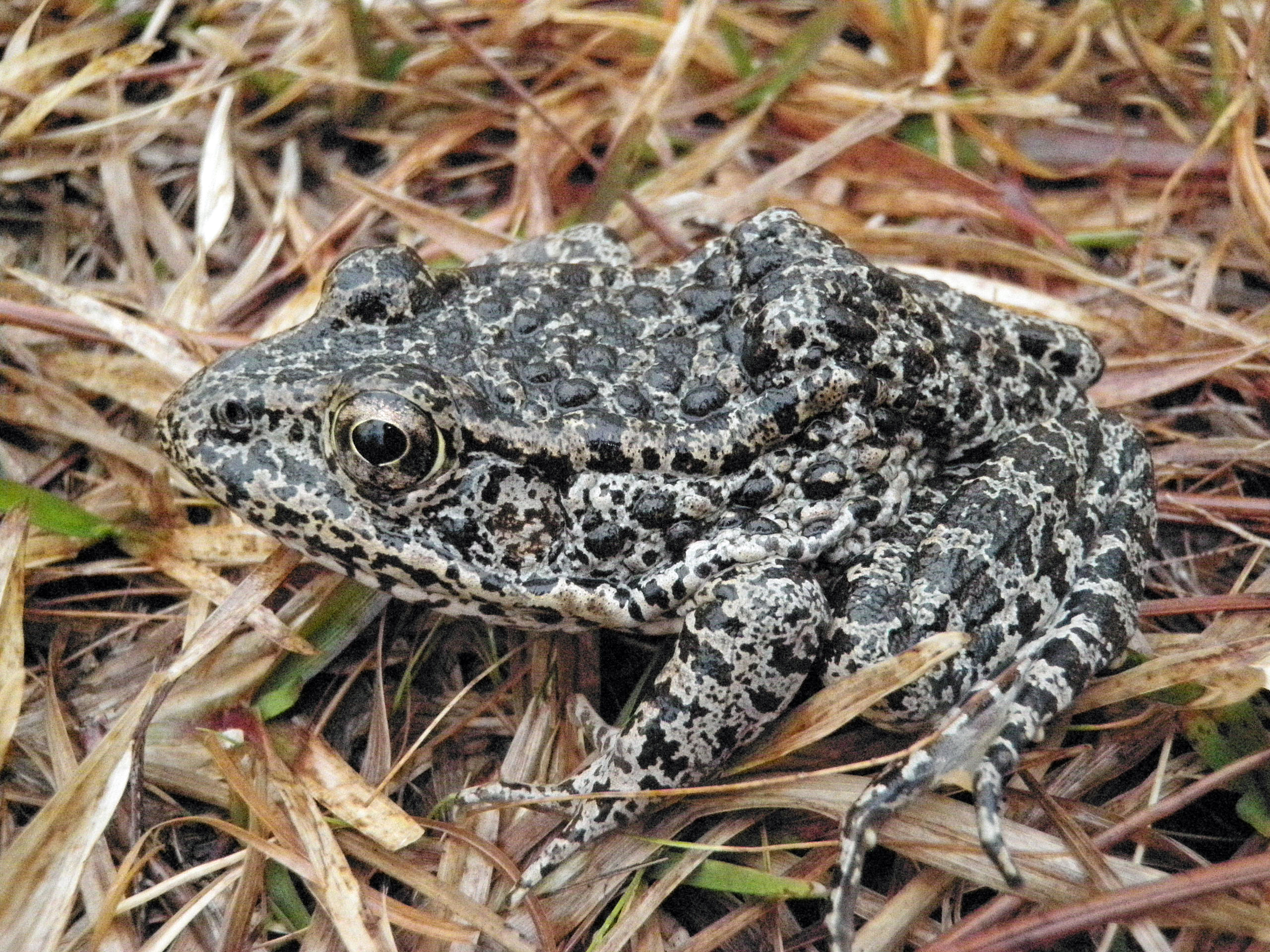
Dusky gopher frog

By 2018, critical habitat designation on private land in Louisiana for the Mississippi gopher frog (also known as dusky gopher frog) had become so controversial that the U.S. Supreme Court chose to adjudicate a lower court decision. The result effectively removed the habitat designation as overreach, owing to the species having gone missing from Louisiana a half-century earlier. The agency consequently modified its regulations in accordance with the ruling.

In 2022, a 6-inch flowering plant, Tiehm's buckwheat, was listed as endangered and accorded critical habitat protection on 910 acres of federal lands in Nevada. The listing was controversial because mining for lithium (crucial for solar power battery storage) was already underway in the area. Following the required environmental review and agency consultation, the federal government issued a permit in October 2024 that authorized the lithium mining project to move forward.

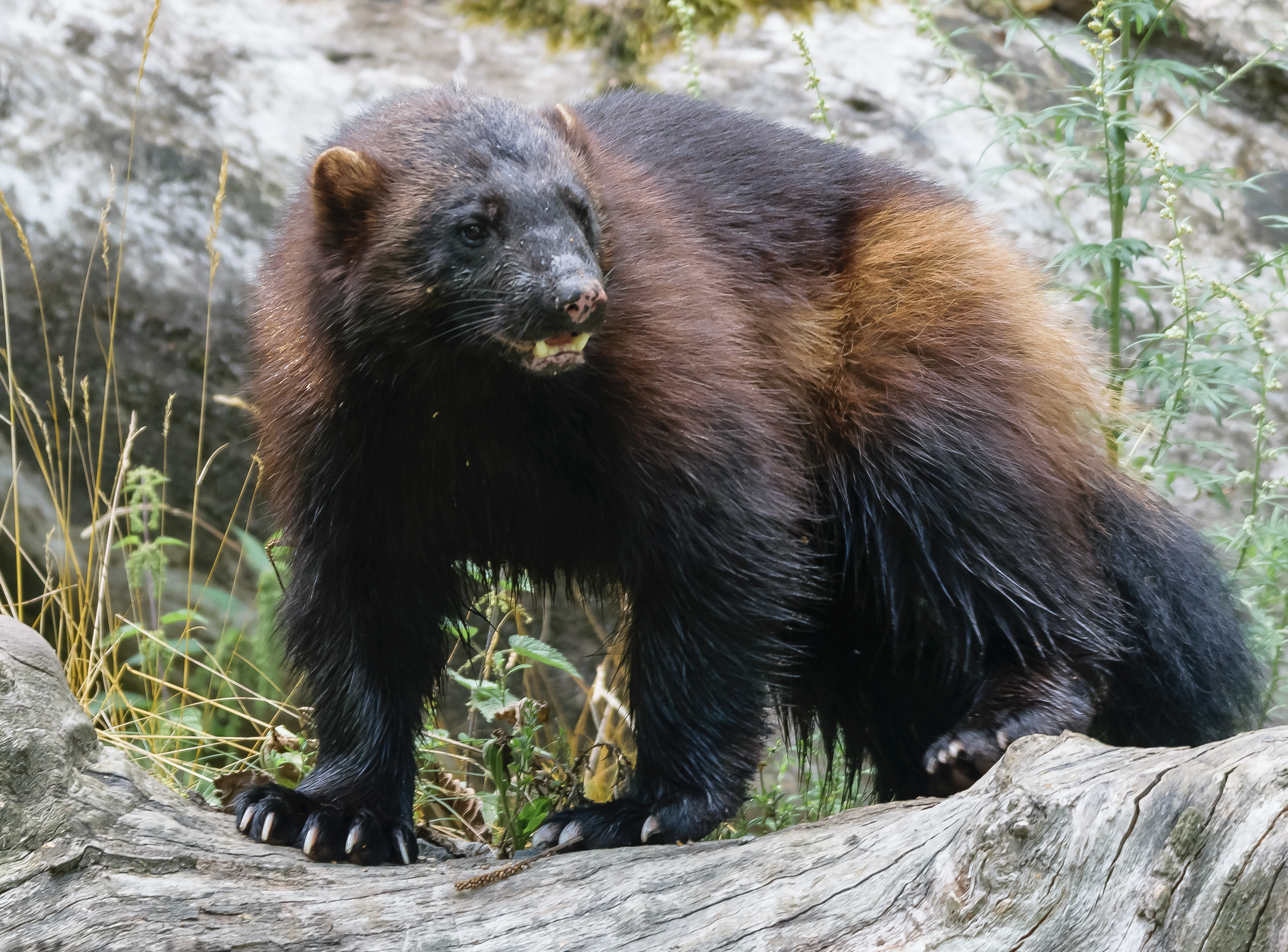
The "species status assessment" for the wolverine entails 96 pages.

In 2023, the largest and fiercest member of the weasel family, the wolverine, was listed as threatened for habitat outside of Alaska. The listing was controversial because climate change was invoked as a primary cause of the "rising temperatures and declining snowpack" making successful snow cave denning difficult for the remaining populations in the Cascade Range and Rocky Mountains. The 2023 listing followed a decade of contentious proceedings, starting with the Fish and Wildlife Service itself proposing in 2013 that the wolverine be listed as threatened, then withdrawing its listing proposal the following year. This prompted a successful district court challenge in Montana by Defenders of Wildlife, based on the agency having "unlawfully ignored the best available science" regarding the impacts of climate change on declining snowpack. On remand, the agency in 2018 once again decided a listing was "unwarranted," and again conservation groups sued in court. As of early 2025, the 2023 official listing as "threatened" has not been challenged.

In 2024, climate change was again stated as cause for a listing. The Mount Rainier white-tailed ptarmigan was listed as threatened because: "The Service has determined that the loss and degradation of its habitat resulting from climate change will endanger the bird in the foreseeable future." Lagopus leucurus saxatilis is one of five subspecies of White-tailed ptarmigan that depend on arctic or alpine tundra habitats. Listing was initially petitioned in 2010 by the Center for Biological Diversity.

== Section-by-Section Summaries of the 1973 Act ==
As amended, the Act entails 18 sections. The substantive policy sections are summarized below.

=== Section 4: Listing and Recovery ===
Section 4 of the ESA sets forth the process by which species are designated as endangered or threatened. Species with these designations receive protections under federal law. Section 4 also requires critical habitat designation and recovery plans for those species.

==== Petition and listing ====
To be considered for listing, the species must meet one of five criteria (section 4(a)(1)):

1. There is the present or threatened destruction, modification, or curtailment of its habitat or range.
2. An overuse for commercial, recreational, scientific, or educational purposes.
3. The species is declining due to disease or predation.
4. There is an inadequacy of existing regulatory mechanisms.
5. There are other natural or manmade factors affecting its continued existence.

Potential candidate species are then prioritized, with "emergency listing" given the highest priority. Species that face a "significant risk to their well being" are in this category.

A species can be listed in two ways. The United States Fish and Wildlife Service (FWS) or NOAA Fisheries (also called the National Marine Fisheries Service) can directly list a species through its candidate assessment program, or an individual or organizational petition may request that the FWS or NMFS list a species. A "species" under the act can be a true taxonomic species, a subspecies, or in the case of vertebrates, a "distinct population segment." The procedures are the same for both types except with the person/organization petition, there is a 90-day screening period.

During the listing process, economic factors cannot be considered but must be " based solely on the best scientific and commercial data available." The 1982 amendment to the ESA added the word "solely" to prevent any consideration other than the biological status of the species. Congress rejected President Ronald Reagan's Executive Order 12291 which required economic analysis of all government agency actions. The House committee's statement was "that economic considerations have no relevance to determinations regarding the status of species."

The very opposite result happened with the 1978 amendment where Congress added the words "...taking into consideration the economic impact..." in the provision on critical habitat designation. The 1978 amendment linked the listing procedure with critical habitat designation and economic considerations, which almost completely halted new listings, with almost 2,000 species being withdrawn from consideration.

==== Listing process ====
After receiving a petition to list a species, the two federal agencies take the following steps, or rulemaking procedures, with each step being published in the Federal Register, the US government's official journal of proposed or adopted rules and regulations:

1. If a petition presents information that the species may be imperiled, a screening period of 90 days begins (interested persons and/or organization petitions only). If the petition does not present substantial information to support listing, it is denied.

2. If the information is substantial, a status review is started, which is a comprehensive assessment of a species' biological status and threats, with a result of: "warranted", "not warranted," or "warranted but precluded."

- A finding of not warranted, the listing process ends.
- Warranted finding means the agencies publish a 12-month finding (a proposed rule) within one year of the date of the petition, proposing to list the species as threatened or endangered. Comments are solicited from the public, and one or more public hearings may be held. Three expert opinions from appropriate and independent specialists may be included, but this is voluntary.
- A "warranted but precluded" finding is automatically recycled back through the 12-month process indefinitely until a result of either "not warranted" or "warranted" is determined. The agencies monitor the status of any "warranted but precluded" species.

Essentially the "warranted but precluded" finding is a deferral added by the 1982 amendment to the ESA. It means other, higher-priority actions will take precedence. For example, an emergency listing of a rare plant growing in a wetland that is scheduled to be filled in for housing construction would be a "higher-priority".

3. Within another year, a final determination (a final rule) must be made on whether to list the species. The final rule time limit may be extended for 6 months and listings may be grouped together according to similar geography, threats, habitat or taxonomy.

The annual rate of listing (i.e., classifying species as "threatened" or "endangered") increased steadily from the Ford administration (47 listings, 15 per year) through Carter (126 listings, 32 per year), Reagan (255 listings, 32 per year), George H. W. Bush (231 listings, 58 per year), and Clinton (521 listings, 65 per year) before decline to its lowest rate under George W. Bush (60 listings, 8 per year as of 5/24/08).

The rate of listing is strongly correlated with citizen involvement and mandatory timelines: as agency discretion decreases and citizen involvement increases (i.e. filing of petitions and lawsuits) the rate of listing increases. Citizen involvement has been shown to identify species not moving through the process efficiently, and identify more imperiled species. The longer species are listed, the more likely they are to be classified as recovering by the FWS.

==== Public notice, comments and judicial review ====
Public notice is given through legal notices in newspapers and communicated to state and county agencies within the species' area. Foreign nations may also receive notice of a listing. A public hearing is mandatory if any person has requested one within 45 days of the published notice. "The purpose of the notice and comment requirement is to provide for meaningful public participation in the rulemaking process." summarized the Ninth Circuit court in the case of Idaho Farm Bureau Federation v. Babbitt.

A frequent basis for ESA litigation is the government's failure to adhere to the law's deadlines for action on petitions to list or delist species. A 2017 GAO found that, in the preceding decade, nearly 150 lawsuits were filed contesting the government's violation of various ESA deadlines. The study noted that most of these lawsuits were settled.

==== Listing status ====
U.S. Endangered Species Act (ESA)

Listing status and its abbreviations used in Federal Register and by federal agencies like the U.S. Fish and Wildlife Service:

- E = endangered (Sec.3.6, Sec.4.a) – any species which is in danger of extinction throughout all or a significant portion of its range other than a species of the Class Insecta determined by the Secretary to constitute a pest.
- T = threatened (Sec.3.20, Sec.4.a) – any species which is likely to become an endangered species within the foreseeable future throughout all or a significant portion of its range

Other categories:

- C = candidate (Sec.4.b.3) – a species under consideration for official listing
- E(S/A), T(S/A) = endangered or threatened due to similarity of appearance (Sec.4.e) – a species not endangered or threatened, but so closely resembles in appearance a species which has been listed as endangered or threatened, that enforcement personnel would have substantial difficulty in attempting to differentiate between the listed and unlisted species.
- XE, XN = experimental essential or non-essential population (Sec.10.j) – any population (including eggs, propagules, or individuals) of an endangered species or a threatened species released outside the current range under authorization of the Secretary. Experimental, nonessential populations of endangered species are treated as threatened species on public land, for consultation purposes, and as species proposed for listing on private land.

==== Recovery plan ====
Fish and Wildlife Service (FWS) and National Marine Fisheries Service (NMFS) are required to create an Endangered Species Recovery Plan outlining the goals, tasks required, likely costs, and estimated timeline to recover endangered species (i.e., increase their numbers and improve their management to the point where they can be removed from the endangered list). The ESA does allow FWS and NMFS to forgo a recovery plan by declaring it will not benefit the species, but this provision has rarely been invoked. It was most famously used to deny a recovery plan to the northern spotted owl in 1991, but in 2006 the FWS changed course and announced it would complete a plan for the species. The ESA does not specify when a recovery plan must be completed. The FWS has a policy specifying completion within three years of the species being listed, but the average time to completion is approximately six years. The annual rate of recovery plan completion increased steadily from the Ford administration (4) through Carter (9), Reagan (30), Bush I (44), and Clinton (72), but declined under Bush II (16 per year as of 9/1/06).

The goal of the law is to make itself unnecessary, and recovery plans are a means toward that goal. Recovery plans became more specific after 1988 when Congress added provisions to Section 4(f) of the law that spelled out the minimum contents of a recovery plan. Three types of information must be included:

- A description of "site-specific" management actions to make the plan as explicit as possible.
- The "objective, measurable criteria" to serve as a baseline for judging when and how well a species is recovering.
- An estimate of money and resources needed to achieve the goal of recovery and delisting.

The amendment also added public participation to the process. There is a ranking order, similar to the listing procedures, for recovery plans, with the highest priority being for species most likely to benefit from recovery plans, especially when the threat is from construction, or other developmental or economic activity. Recovery plans cover domestic and migratory species.

Beginning in 2016, the FWS augmented standard recovery planning by shifting to a three-part framework. Statutory and regulatory requirements for producing an initial "recovery plan" will still be fulfilled, including opportunities for public comments. The plan is to be written and published in the customary way, and it continues to be subject to the "five year review" process. However, two new kinds of working documents are now developed, posted, and updated as needed for each listed species.

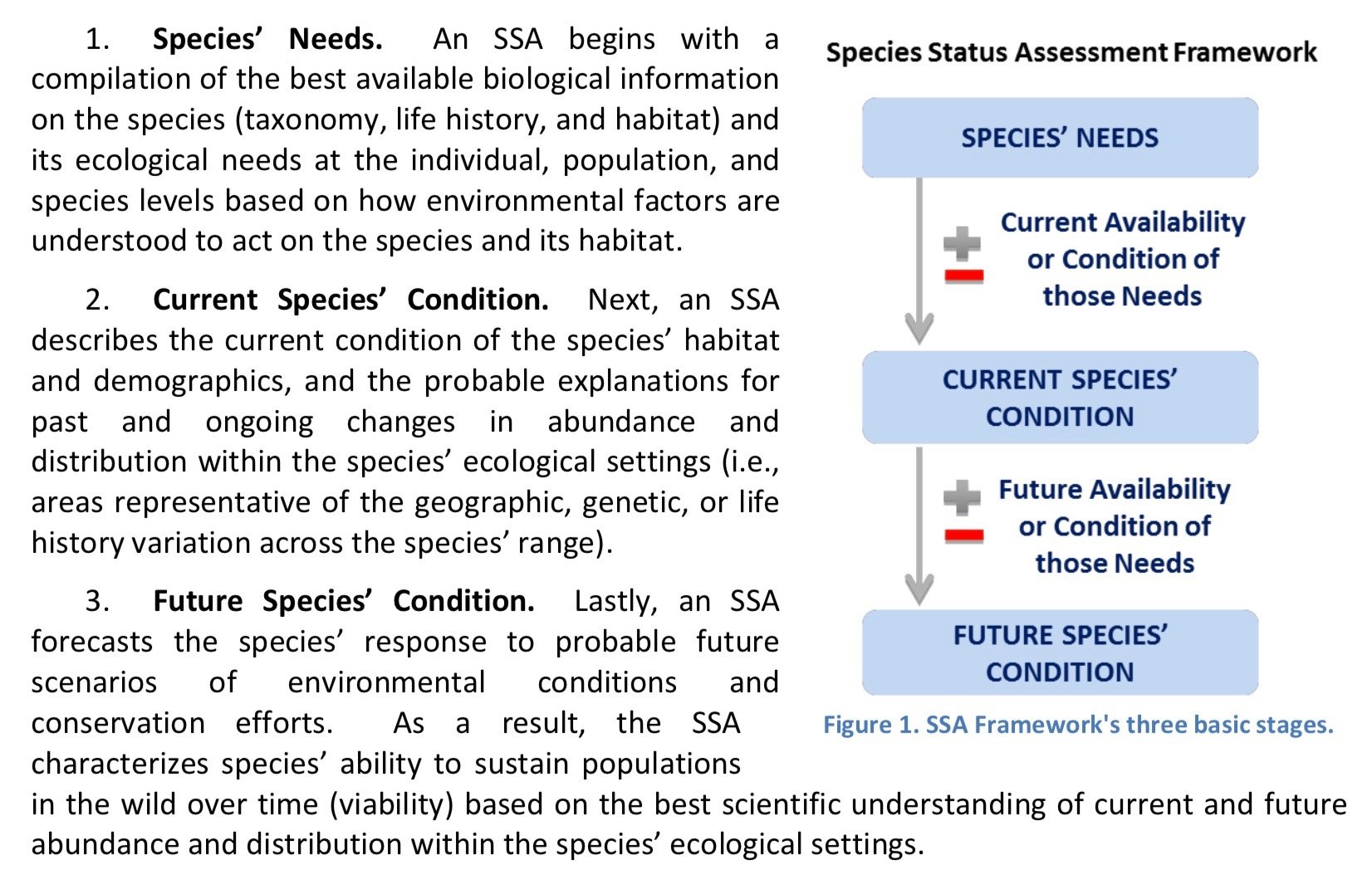
"Species Status Assessment Framework" U.S. Fish & Wildlife Service

The first updatable document is a "Species Status Assessment" (SSA). It is "a biological risk assessment to aid decision makers who must use the best available scientific information to make policy decisions under the ESA." As new papers are published and rigorous data collected, the SSA can be updated and reposted as warranted. This, in turn, may stimulate changes in the third part of the new framework: the "Recovery Implementation Strategy" (RIS). While recovery actions are policy level decisions that will continue to be delineated in the official recovery plan, the RIS serves as "a short-term, more flexible operational document focused on how, when, and with whom the recovery actions will be implemented." A single species may ultimately have a number of RIS documents posted — each pertaining to a different entity, such as a land trust or botanical garden, that steps forward (with or without federal funding) to voluntarily engage in one or more specific recovery actions:

The RIS will be developed with our conservation partners, and focus on the period of time and scope of activities that work best for our partners to achieve recovery goals. Many RISs can be developed, specific to partners and/or activities, and can cover varying timeframes, as needed. If multiple RISs are developed, an 'umbrella framework' or overarching RIS, outlining the relationships and priorities among the individual RISs, is developed to ensure strategic implementation of the overall recovery program for the species.

==== Downlisting and Delisting ====
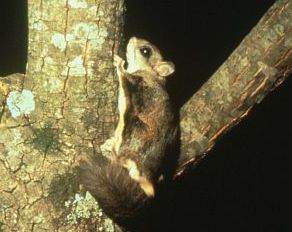
Northern flying squirrel

"Downlisting" of a species can take place when important threats have been controlled and the population in the wild meets recovery objectives. Downlisting entails reclassification from "endangered" to "threatened."

To "delist" a species, several factors are considered: control or elimination of threats, population size and growth in the wild, and the stability of habitat quality and quantity. Species can also be delisted if an error (notably, population size) is found in the data used for listing in the first place. More than a dozen species have been delisted under such circumstances.

Three examples of animal species delisted are: the Virginia northern flying squirrel (subspecies) in August 2008, which had been listed since 1985, and the gray wolf (Northern Rocky Mountain DPS), and the bald eagle, which was delisted in 2007 as a result of litigation (Contoski v. Scarlett) brought by a Minnesota landowner objecting to eagle protection rules that prohibited the development of his property. On April 15, 2011, President Obama signed the Department of Defense and Full-Year Appropriations Act of 2011. A section of that Appropriations Act directed the Secretary of the Interior to reissue within 60 days of enactment the final rule published on April 2, 2009, that identified the Northern Rocky Mountain population of gray wolf (Canis lupus) as a distinct population segment (DPS) and to revise the List of Endangered and Threatened Wildlife by removing most of the gray wolves in the DPS.

The US Fish and Wildlife Service's delisting report lists four plants that have recovered:

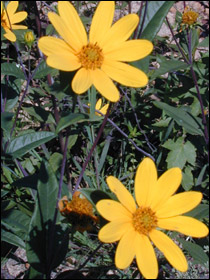
Eggert's sunflower (Helianthus eggertii)

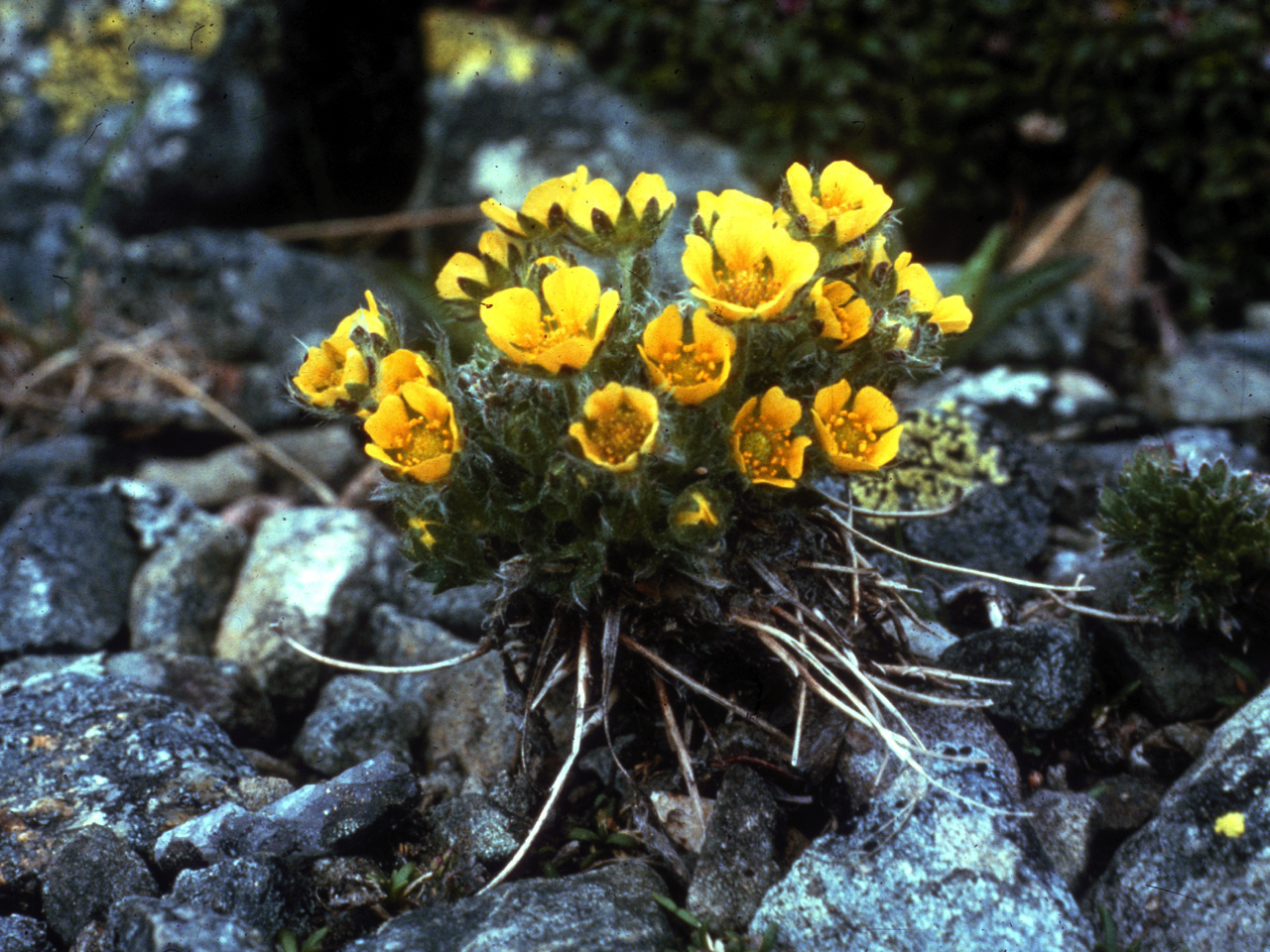
Robbins' cinquefoil (Potentilla robbinsiana), an alpine wildflower found in the White Mountains of New Hampshire

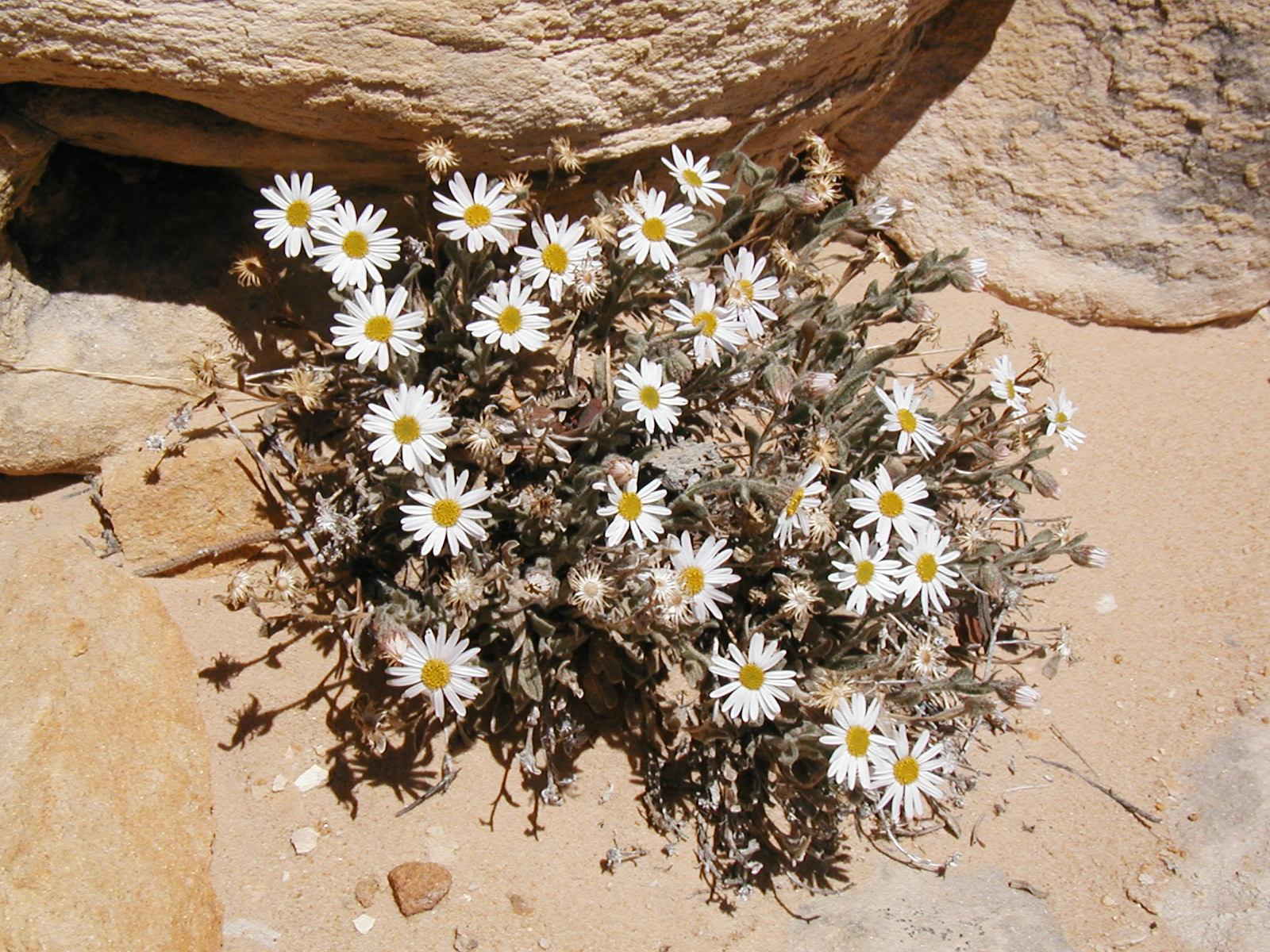
Maguire daisy (Erigeron maguirei)

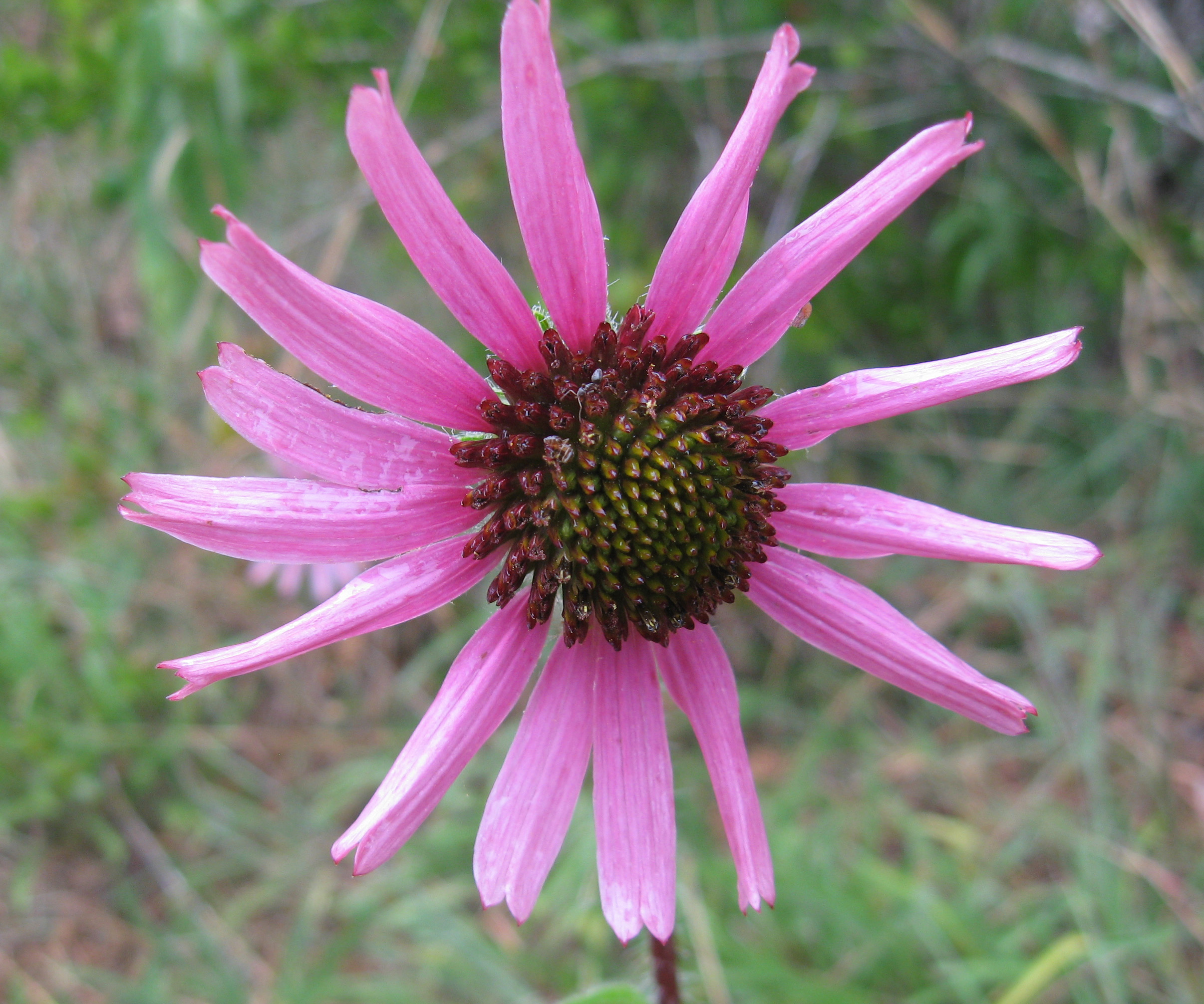
Tennessee purple coneflower (Echinacea tennesseensis)

=== Section 6: State endangered species lists ===
Section 6 of the Endangered Species Act provided funding for development of programs for management of threatened and endangered species by state wildlife agencies. Subsequently, lists of endangered and threatened species within their boundaries have been prepared by each state. These state lists often include species which are considered endangered or threatened within a specific state but not within all states, and which therefore are not included on the national list of endangered and threatened species. Examples include Florida, Minnesota, and Maine.

=== Section 7: Cooperation and Consultation ===
==== Overview ====
Section 7 of the Endangered Species Act requires cooperation among federal agencies to conserve endangered or threatened species. Section 7(a)(1) directs the Secretary of the Interior and all federal agencies to proactively use their authorities to conserve such species. This directive is often referred to as an 'affirmative requirement.' Section 7(a)(2) of the Act requires federal agencies to ensure their actions do not jeopardize listed species or adversely modify critical habitat. Federal agencies (referred to as "action agencies") must consult with the Secretary of the Interior before taking any action which may affect listed species. Section 7(a)(2) is often referred to as the consultation process.

The two agencies that administer the Act are the National Marine Fisheries Service (NMFS) and the U.S. Fish and Wildlife Service (FWS). These two agencies are often collectively referred to as "the Services" and lead the consultation process. FWS is responsible for the recovery of terrestrial, freshwater, and catadromous species. NMFS is responsible for marine species and anadromous fish. NMFS manages recovery for 165 endangered and threatened marine species including 66 foreign species. As of January 2020, the Services have listed 2,273 species worldwide as endangered or threatened. 1,662 of these species occur in the United States.

==== Section 7(a)(1) ====
Section 7(a)(1) requires federal agencies to work with FWS and NMFS to coordinate endangered and threatened species conservation. Federal agencies should also account for any effects on endangered or threatened species in planning their activities.

An example of the 7(a)(1) process is the Army Corps of Engineers' management of the Lower Mississippi River. Since the early 2000s, a division of the U.S. Army Corps of Engineers has worked with FWS and the states to resolve endangered species and ecosystem management issues. ESA-listed species in the area include the least tern (Sterna antillarum), pallid sturgeon (Scaphirhynchus albus), and the fat pocketbook (potamilus capax). The goal of this 7(a)(1) conservation plan is to protect listed species while allowing the Corps to carry out its civil works responsibilities. As part of the plan, the Corps undertakes projects that will benefit those species. It also considers species ecology as a part of project design. All three listed species in the Lower Mississippi River have increased in numbers since the plan was established.

==== Section 7(a)(2) ====
An action agency is required to consult with the Services if it has reason to believe that a species listed under the ESA may be present in the proposed project area. It also must consult if the agency believes the action will likely affect the species. This requirement, established by section 7(a)(2), is commonly referred to as the consultation process.

==== Informal consultation phase ====
Consultation typically begins informally at the request of an action agency in the early stages of project planning. Discussion topics include listed species in the proposed action area and any effect(s) the action may have on those species. If both agencies agree that the proposed action is not likely to affect the species, the project moves forward. However, if the agency's action may affect a listed species, the agency is required to prepare a biological assessment.

==== Biological assessments ====
A biological assessment is a document prepared by the action agency. It lays out the project's potential effects, particularly on listed species. The action agency must complete a biological assessment if listed species or critical habitat may be present. The assessment is optional if only proposed species or critical habitat are present.

As a part of the assessment, the action agency conducts on-site inspections to see whether protected species are present. The assessment will also include the likely effects of the action on such species. The assessment should address all listed and proposed species in the action area, not only those likely to be affected.

The biological assessment may also include conservation measures. Conservation measures are actions the agency intends to take to promote the recovery of listed species. These actions may also serve to minimize the projects' effects on species in the project area.

There are three possible conclusions to a biological assessment: "no effect", "not likely to adversely affect", or "likely to adversely affect" listed or proposed species.

The action agency may reach a "no effect" conclusion if it determines the proposed action will not affect listed species or designated critical habitat. The action agency may reach a "not likely to adversely affect" decision if the proposed action is insignificant or beneficial. The Services will then review the biological assessment and either agree or disagree with the agency's findings. If the Services agree the project's potential impacts have been eliminated, they will concur in writing. The concurrence letter must outline any modifications agreed to during informal consultation. If an agreement cannot be reached, the Services advise the action agency to initiate formal consultation.

If the Services or the action agency finds the action "likely to adversely affect" protected species, this triggers formal consultation.

==== Formal consultation ====
During formal consultation, the Services establish the project's effects on listed species. Specifically, they address whether the project will jeopardize the continued existence of any listed species or destroy/adversely modify species' designated critical habitat.

"Jeopardy" is not defined in the ESA, but the Services have defined it in regulation to mean "when an action is likely to appreciably reduce a species' likelihood of survival and recovery in the wild." In other words, if an action merely reduces the likelihood of recovery but not survival then the standard of jeopardy is not met.

To assess the likelihood of jeopardy, the Services will review the species' biological and ecological traits. These could include the species' population dynamics (population size, variability and stability), life-history traits, critical habitat, and how any proposed action might alter its critical habitat. They also consider how limited the species' range is and whether the threats that led to species listing have improved or worsened since listing.

The Services have defined adverse modification as "a diminishment of critical habitat that leads to a lower likelihood of survival and recovery for a listed species." The diminishment may be direct or indirect. To assess the likelihood of adverse modification, biologists will first verify the scope of the proposed action. This includes identifying the area likely to be affected and considering the proximity of the action to species or designated critical habitat. The duration and frequency of any disturbance to the species or its habitat is also assessed.

A formal consultation may last up to 90 days. After this time the Services will issue a biological opinion. The biological opinion contains findings related to the project's effects on listed and proposed species. The Services must complete the biological opinion within 45 days of the conclusion of formal consultation. However, the Services may extend this timeline if they require more information to make a determination. The action agency must agree to the extension.

==== Finding of no jeopardy or adverse modification ====
The Services may issue a finding of "no jeopardy or adverse modification" if the proposed action does not pose any harm to listed or proposed species or their designated critical habitat. Alternatively, the Service could find that proposed action is likely to harm listed or proposed species or their critical habitat but does not reach the level of jeopardy or adverse modification. In this case, the Services will prepare an incidental take statement. Under most circumstances, the ESA prohibits "take" of listed species. Take includes harming, killing or harassing a listed species. However, the ESA allows for "incidental" take that results from an otherwise lawful activity that is not the direct purpose of the action.

An incidental take statement will be agreed to between the Services and the action agency. The statement should describe the amount of anticipated take due to the proposed action. It will also include "reasonable and prudent measures" to minimize the take. Incidental take cannot pose jeopardy or potential extinction to species.

==== Finding of jeopardy or adverse modification ====
Following formal consultation, the Services may determine that the action will result in jeopardy or adverse modification to critical habitat. If this is the case, this finding will be included in the biological opinion.

However, during consultation, the Services may find there are actions that the agency may take to avoid this. These actions are known as reasonable and prudent alternative actions. In the event of a jeopardy or adverse modification finding, the agency must adopt reasonable and prudent alternative actions. However, the Services retain final say on which are included in the biological opinion.

According to regulation, reasonable and prudent alternative actions must:

- Be consistent with the purpose of the proposed project
- Be consistent with the action agency's legal authority and jurisdiction
- Be economically and technically feasible
- In the opinion of the Services, avoid jeopardy

Given a finding of jeopardy or adverse modification, the action agency has several options:

- Adopt one or more of the reasonable and prudent alternative actions and move forward with the modified project
- Elect not to grant the permit, fund the project, or undertake the action
- Request an exemption from the Endangered Species Committee. Another possibility is to re-initiate consultation. The action agency would do this by first proposing to modify the action
- Propose reasonable and prudent alternatives not yet considered

The action agency must notify the Services of its course of action on any project that receives a jeopardy or adverse modification opinion.

In the past ten years, FWS has made jeopardy determinations in three cases (delta smelt, aquatic species in Idaho, and South Florida water management), each of which has included reasonable and prudent alternatives. No project has been stopped as a result of FWS finding a project had no available path forward. This fact however, does not present the full picture, as even where projects can proceed, Section 7 consultation regularly results in dramatic and costly changes to the scope of such projects. And in practice, the result of consultation under the ESA is almost always the imposition of additional restrictions on land use activity.

In rare cases, no alternatives to avoid jeopardy or adverse modification will be available. An analysis of FWS consultations from 1987 to 1991 found only 0.02% were blocked or canceled because of a jeopardy or adverse modification opinion with no reasonable and prudent alternatives. In this scenario, the only option that the action agency and applicant are left with is to apply for an exemption. Exemptions are decided upon by the Endangered Species Committee.

==== Exemptions ====
An action agency may apply for an exemption if: (1) it believes it cannot comply with the requirements of the biological opinion; or (2) formal consultation yields no reasonable and prudent alternative actions. The exemption application must be submitted to the Secretary of the Interior within 90 days of the conclusion of formal consultation.

The Secretary can then recommend the application to the Endangered Species Committee (informally known as "The God Squad"). This committee is composed of several Cabinet-level members:

- The Secretary of Agriculture
- The Secretary of the Army
- The Secretary of the Interior
- The Chairman of the Council of Economic Advisers
- The Administrator of the Environmental Protection Agency
- The Administrator of the National Oceanic and Atmospheric Administration
- One representative from each affected State (appointed by the President of the United States)

==== Endangered Species Committee decisions ====
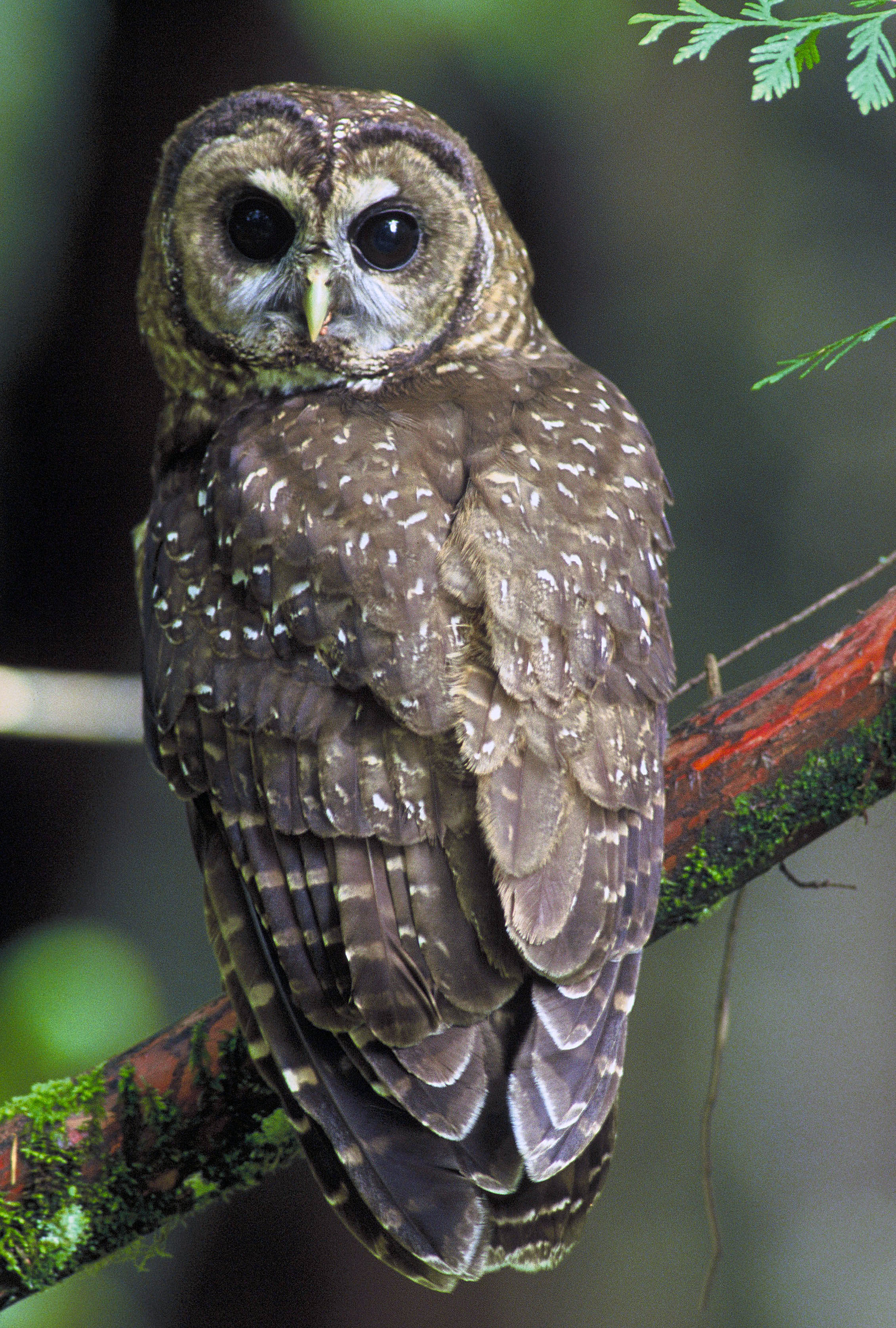
Northern spotted owl

The governor of each affected state is notified of any exemption applications. The governor will recommend a representative to join the committee for this application decision. Within 140 days of recommending an exemption, the Secretary should submit to the committee a report that gives:

- The availability of reasonable and prudent alternatives
- A comparison of the benefits of the proposed action to any alternative courses of action
- Whether the proposed action is in the public interest or is of national or regional significance
- Available mitigation measures to limit the effects on listed species
- Whether the action agency made any irreversible or irretrievable commitment of resources

Once this information is received, the committee and the secretary will hold a public hearing. The committee has 30 days from the time of receiving the above report to make a decision. In order for the exemption to be granted, five out of the seven members must vote in favor of the exemption. The findings can be challenged in federal court. In 1992, one such challenge was the case of Portland Audubon Society v. Endangered Species Committee heard in the Ninth Circuit Court of Appeals.

The court found that three members had been in illegal ex parte contact with the then-President George H.W. Bush, a violation of the Administrative Procedure Act. The committee's exemption was for the Bureau of Land Management's timber sale and "incidental takes" of the endangered northern spotted owl in Oregon.

Rarely does the Endangered Species Committee consider projects for exemption. The Endangered Species Committee has only met four times since the inception of the ESA. An exemption was granted on three of these occasions. Most recently, in March 2026, the committee voted unanimously to exempt the oil and gas industry in the Gulf of Mexico from all endangered species regulations, upon the recommendation of Defense Secretary Pete Hegseth. The Center for Biological Diversity is challenging the exemption before the United States District Court for the District of Columbia. The exemption is expected to drive the Rice's whale to extinction.

=== Section 10: Permitting, Conservation Agreements, and Experimental Populations ===
Section 10 of the ESA provides a permit system that may allow acts prohibited by Section 9. This includes scientific and conservation activities. For example, the government may let someone move a species from one area to another. This would otherwise be a prohibited taking under Section 9. Before the law was amended in 1982, a listed species could be taken only for scientific or research purposes. The combined result of the amendments to the Endangered Species Act have created a more flexible ESA. Nevertheless, the process for obtaining such a permit is often time consuming, costly, and burdensome: To receive such a permit a landowner must create a habitat conservation plan (see further discussion below) and is generally required to agree to significant project modifications and costly mitigation.

More changes were made in the 1990s in an attempt by Secretary of the Interior Bruce Babbitt to shield the ESA from a Congress hostile to the law. He instituted incentive-based strategies that would balance the goals of economic development and conservation.

==== Habitat conservation plans ====
Section 10 may also allow activities that can unintentionally impact protected species. A common activity might be construction where these species live. More than half of habitat for listed species is on non-federal property. Under section 10, impacted parties can apply for an incidental take permit (ITP). An application for an ITP requires a Habitat Conservation Plan (HCP). HCPs must minimize and mitigate the impacts of the activity. HCPs can be established to provide protections for both listed and non-listed species. Such non-listed species include species that have been proposed for listing. Hundreds of HCPs have been created. However, the effectiveness of the HCP program remains unknown.

If activities may unintentionally take a protected species, an incidental take permit can be issued. The applicant submits an application with an habitat conservation plan (HCP). If approved by the agency (FWS or NMFS) they are issued an Incidental Take Permit (ITP). The permit allows a certain number of the species to be "taken." The Services have a "No Surprises" policy for HCPs. Once an ITP is granted, the Services cannot require applicants to spend more money or set aside additional land or pay more.

To receive the benefit of the permit the applicant must comply with all the requirements of the HCP. Because the permit is issued by a federal agency to a private party, it is a federal action. Other federal laws will apply such as the National Environmental Policy Act (NEPA) and Administrative Procedure Act (APA). A notice of the permit application action must be published in the Federal Register and a public comment period of 30 to 90 days offered.

==== Safe Harbor Agreements ====
The "Safe Harbor" agreement (SHA) is similar to an HCP. It is voluntary between the private landowner and the Services. The landowner agrees to alter the property to benefit a listed or proposed species. In exchange, the Services will allow some future "takes" through an Enhancement of Survival Permit. A landowner can have either a "Safe Harbor" agreement or an HCP, or both. The policy was developed by the Clinton administration. Unlike an HCP the activities covered by a SHA are designed to protect species. The policy relies on the "enhancement of survival" provision of Section §1539(a)(1)(A). Safe harbor agreements are subject to public comment rules of the APA.

==== Candidate Conservation Agreements With Assurances ====
HCPs and SHAs are applied to listed species. If an activity may "take" a proposed or candidate species, parties can enter into Candidate Conservation Agreements With Assurances (CCAA). A party must show the Services they will take conservation measures to prevent listing. If a CCAA is approved and the species is later listed, the party with a CCAA gets an automatic "enhancement of survival" permit under Section §1539(a)(1)(A). CCAAs are subject to the public comment rules of the APA.

==== Experimental populations ====
Experimental populations are listed species that have been intentionally introduced to a new area. They must be separate geographically from other populations of the same species. Experimental populations can be designated "essential" or "non-essential" "Essential" populations are those whose loss would appreciably reduce the survival of the species in the wild. "Non-essential" populations are all others. Nonessential experimental populations of listed species typically receive less protection than populations in the wild.

==== Penalties ====
There are different degrees of violation with the law. The most punishable offenses are trafficking, and any act of knowingly "taking" (which includes harming, wounding, or killing) an endangered species. The penalties for these violations can be a maximum fine of up to $50,000 or imprisonment for one year, or both, and civil penalties of up to $25,000 per violation may be assessed. Lists of violations and exact fines are available through the National Oceanic and Atmospheric Administration website.

These penalties are subject to the Federal Civil Penalties Inflation Adjustment Act Improvements Act of 2015, and as of 2024 had increased to $63,991 for knowing violations of the ESA's take prohibition, and $30,715 for any other knowing violation of the ESA.

One provision of this law is that no penalty may be imposed if, by a preponderance of the evidence that the act was in self-defense. The law also eliminates criminal penalties for accidentally killing listed species during farming and ranching activities.

In addition to fines or imprisonment, a license, permit, or other agreement issued by a federal agency that authorized an individual to import or export fish, wildlife, or plants may be revoked, suspended or modified. Any federal hunting or fishing permits that were issued to a person who violates the ESA can be canceled or suspended for up to a year.

==== Use of money received through violations of the ESA ====
A reward will be paid to any person who furnishes information which leads to an arrest, conviction, or revocation of a license, so long as they are not a local, state, or federal employee in the performance of official duties. The Secretary may also provide reasonable and necessary costs incurred for the care of fish, wildlife, and forest service or plant pending the violation caused by the criminal. If the balance ever exceeds $500,000 the Secretary of the Treasury is required to deposit an amount equal to the excess into the cooperative endangered species conservation fund.
