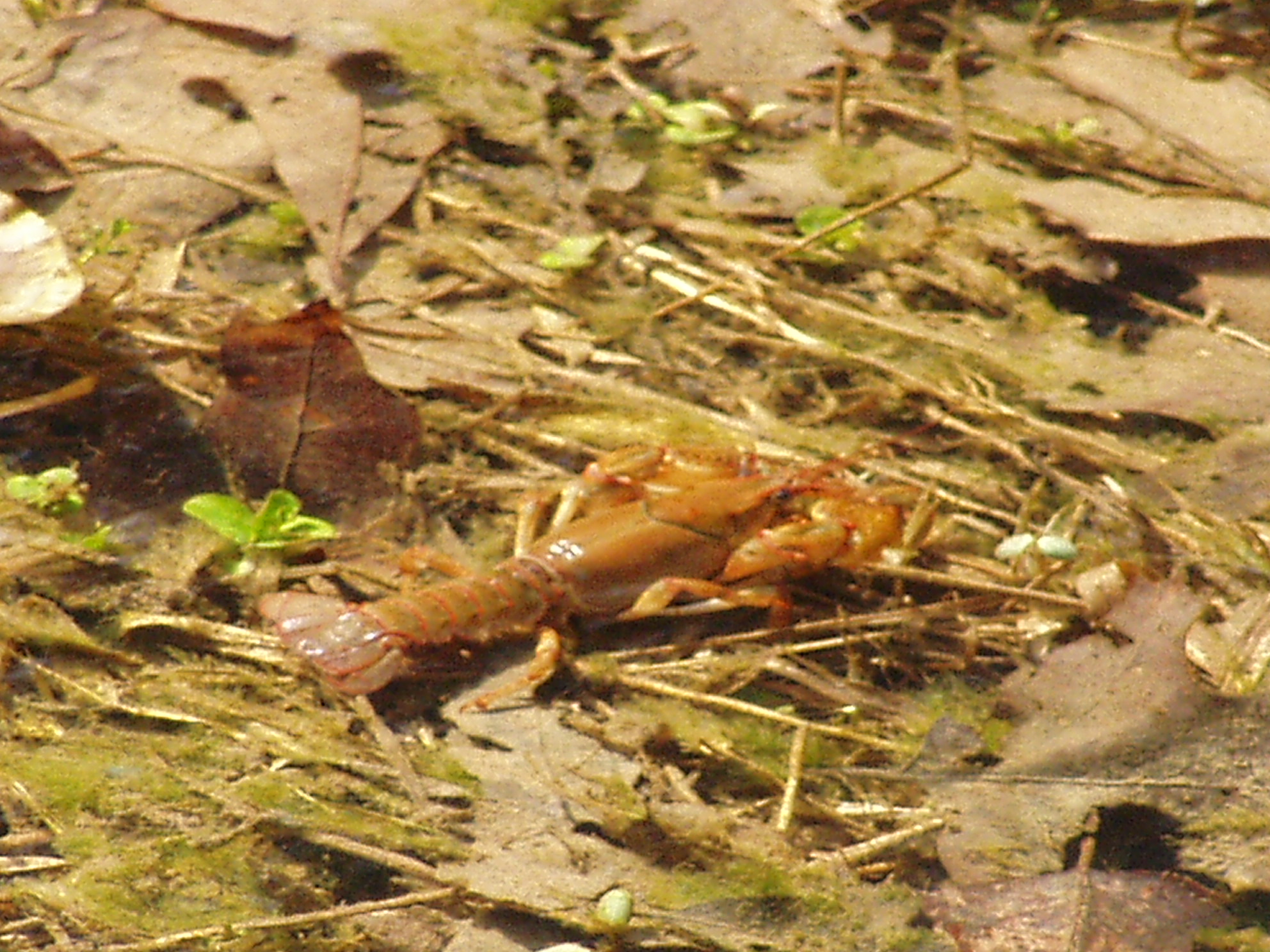

Conservation status
- Endangered (IUCN 3.1)

- Critically Imperiled (NatureServe)

Scientific classification
- Kingdom: Animalia
- Phylum: Arthropoda
- Class: Malacostraca
- Order: Decapoda
- Suborder: Pleocyemata
- Family: Cambaridae
- Genus: Faxonius
- Species: F. shoupi

Binomial name
- Faxonius shoupi (Hobbs, 1948)

Synonyms
- Orconectes shoupi Hobbs, 1948

= Faxonius shoupi =

Species of crayfish

Faxonius shoupi, the Nashville crayfish, is a freshwater crustacean native to the Mill Creek Basin in Nashville, Tennessee. Prior to August 2017, the species was called Orconectes shoupi. Faxonius shoupi is protected under the Endangered Species Act (ESA) as an endangered species. However, the crayfish has recently been put up for delisting by the United States Fish and Wildlife Service.

== Description ==
The Nashville crayfish has an orange and black coloration, four pairs of legs, and two elongate pinchers with red tips. The crayfish has a lighter-colored saddle on its back and on the sides of its head. A sigmoidal cleft of the annulus ventralis, or sperm receptacle, is found on larger females. The Nashville crayfish is on the larger side of crayfish, growing to be up to 7 in (180 mm) long.

== Life history ==
Very little is known about Nashville crayfish life history. Most of the research that has been done about the reproduction strategies of this crayfish have been on males. Male crayfish switch between two forms during mating season. The reproductive form is known as "form 1" and the non reproductive form is known as "form 2". The form 1 male gonopod has been described to be shaped "short-curved". This gonopod shape differs from other species' gonopods in the same genus, Faxonius. This is a form of reproductive isolation known as "lock and key", where individuals are prevented from hybridization through the genital shape.

Due to the lack of research on this particular species, the rest of the life history section are assumptions based on other crayfish. Reproduction typically begins in late summer and early fall. This is when males will switch from form 2 to form 1. Females will lay their eggs during the late winter and early spring. Each female lays several hundred eggs. Most of these eggs will die before hatching or in the early stages of life.

== Ecology ==
=== Diet and habitat ===
In general, crayfish eat algae, insects, worms, snails, fish eggs, leaves, and mussels. They forage mostly during the night from sunset to midnight and usually return to their burrows during daylight hours. Female Nashville crayfish can be found under large slab rocks while carrying eggs and young.

=== Range ===
Nashville crayfish are extremely tolerant to a wide range of habitat conditions. They are found in creeks with high amounts of sediment, gravel, slab, or cobble substrate. They can inhabit areas with turbid water due to oil and areas with high amounts of construction debris. The Nashville crayfish's range is very restricted. They are endemic to Mill Creek Basin and its tributaries in Davidson and Williamson Counties in Tennessee. They have recently been found in the Lower Tennessee River at the Pickwick Tailwater. There are 192 stream miles of the Mill Creek Watershed of which the species occupies 104 stream miles (54 percent).

=== Behavior ===
Males with larger chelae tend to be sexually dominant. This is because they are able to hold the female tighter and increase their copulation time. The Nashville crayfish can be aggressive and will attack its opponent by chasing, cornering, or driving it backward. There is little information about the Nashville crayfish's territorial behavior toward its shelter. However, most crayfish are very territorial and will be aggressive to protect their burrows.

== Conservation ==
=== Major threats ===
The Nashville crayfish population faces a number of threats, including poor water quality due to local development, habitat degradation, and a restricted range. Competition with invading crayfish species, Faxonius placidus and Faxonius durelli, poses another threat. Another threat is overutilization for recreational, educational, scientific, or commercial purposes. The species was put up for listing as endangered on January 12, 1977, but the proposal was withdrawn on December 10, 1978. This withdrawal was due to amendments being added to the ESA at the time. On May 22, 1984, the Nashville crayfish was announced to be a potential candidate for protection under the ESA. The species was listed as "endangered" on September 26, 1986.

=== Population size ===
In 1986, when the species was listed, there were only a third of the number of crayfish that were found in 1969. Since listing, recent surveys have shown that the population is increasing due to habitat restoration efforts. In places where habitat has been restored, they have been quick to recolonize. While it was thought that the Nashville crayfish was only found in Mill Creek and seven of its tributaries, a disconnected second population was discovered in the Lower Tennessee River at the Pickwick Tailwater. This second population suggests that their geographic range was historically wider.

=== 5-Year Review ===
The most recent 5-year review of the Nashville crayfish was completed in 2017. The U.S. Fish and Wildlife Service (USFWS) recommended that the species be downlisted from "endangered" to "threatened". The USFWS reported that the species remained high in population numbers over the past 20 years in the Mill Creek area. Despite recent metropolitan growth in the Nashville area, including commercial and residential developments, the species has remained stable or has increased in population numbers. This stabilization indicates that the species has developed a high "resistance to disturbance," decreasing the threat that further metropolitan development could present. While the species is expected to continue to experience some level of threat, the Nashville crayfish population is not expected to be as affected.

=== Species Status Assessment ===
The most recent Species Status Assessment (SSA) was completed in 2018. While the Nashville crayfish suffers from inadequate water quality and spills from increasing urbanization and human populations, the species has still been found in stable or increasing numbers in the Mill Creek area since it has been listed under the ESA. Like the 5-year review stated, the Nashville Metropolitan area is experiencing population, residential, and commercial growth. Additionally, the area has been flooded with stormwater, sediment inputs, and spills of hazardous substances and raw sewage, yet the species' population numbers have remained relatively stable or have increased. The assessment suggests targeting an increase in water quality, however in most scenarios the populations of Nashville crayfish are predicted to survive in the next 40 years.

=== Recovery Plan ===
The Recovery Plan for the Nashville crayfish has not been updated since February 8, 1989. On September 26, 1986, when the species was listed as endangered, a critical habitat was not designated. This is because the threat of take was believed to increase because of their habitat in the Nashville Metropolitan area. The 1989 Recovery Plan reports that the species is threatened by a variety of events resulting from urban development, including the possibility of chemical spill.

== In popular culture ==
In 2023 the Nashville crayfish was featured on a United States Postal Service Forever stamp as part of the Endangered Species set, based on a photograph from Joel Sartore's Photo Ark. The stamp was dedicated at a ceremony at the National Grasslands Visitor Center in Wall, South Dakota.
