= Critical habitat =

Habitat area essential to the conservation of a listed species

Critical habitat refers to specific geographic areas essential to the conservation of a listed endangered species, though the area need not actually be occupied by the species at the time it is designated. Critical habitat is a legal designation of land use defined within the U.S. Endangered Species Act-ESA. Contrary to common belief, designating an area as critical habitat does not preclude that area from development. A critical habitat designation only affects federal agency actions. Such actions include federally funded activities or activities requiring a federal permit that may negatively affect the quality of habitat for a listed species. This law also defines that there may be no "take" of a listed species from the designated area. This land designation aims to protect vital habitat for endangered species by preserving areas that are able to meet the identified needs for the target species. This is a key feature of conservation as outlined in the ESA.

== Designation process ==
Critical habitat must be designated for all threatened species and endangered species under the Endangered Species Act, with certain specified exceptions. Designations of critical habitats must be based on the best scientific information available and follow the procedure as outlined in the ESA. Areas under consideration must contain biological or physical features necessary for the target species survival. These factors may include things such as food, shelter and breeding sites. Before adoption these areas must include a review that is open to public input from all stakeholders within specific time frames. Unless deemed necessary for the species' continued existence, critical habitat does not include the entire geographical area occupied by a species. Department of Defense (DOD) lands are also exempt from being designated as critical habitat. Both public and private land can be specified as critical habitat.

A critical habitat designation does not set up a preserve or refuge; it applies only when Federal funding, permits, or projects are involved. Under Section 7 of the ESA, all Federal agencies must ensure that any actions they authorize, fund, or carry out are not likely to jeopardize the continued existence of a listed species, or destroy or adversely modify its designated critical habitat.

The National Oceanic and Atmospheric Administration and the U.S. Fish and Wildlife Service share the responsibility for designating and implementing critical habitat for listed species.

== Challenges ==
Before designating critical habitat, careful consideration must be given to the economic impacts, impacts on national security, and other relevant impacts of specifying any particular area as critical habitat. An area may be excluded from critical habitat if the benefits of exclusion outweigh the benefits of designation, unless excluding the area will result in the extinction of the species concerned.

In addition to these concerns the process of finding an area to designate as critical habitat, scientific, biological and economic data is needed. This includes detailed population and ecological data. If this information is not readily available then the lead agency must conduct studies to obtain it. This data is used to guide the selection of critical habitat as inadequate knowledge can cause a poor selection of habitat that may not best provide for the species survival. Effective critical habitat designations require vast scientific knowledge of the target species and compromise between stakeholders that balance the needs of environmental protection and economic needs.

== Considerations ==
Conservation and economic views of land use are often in conflict and are taken into account when designating critical habitat. Activities like mining, logging, and transportation infrastructure can have a large impact on the surrounding habitat. Critical habitat requirements do not apply to citizens engaged in activities on private land that do not involve a Federal agency. However, if an activity on private property requires an action by a Federal agency (such as a loan, increasing irrigation flows, permits from a federal agency, etc.), then the Federal agency must ensure that the action will not adversely modify the designated critical habitat.

== Relevant Court Cases ==
Tennessee Valley Authority v Hill (1978)

Lujan v. Defenders of Wildlife (1992)

Sweet Home Chapter of Communities for a Great Oregon v. Babbitt (1995)

United States Fish and Wildlife Service v. Sierra Club (2021)

== See also ==
- Habitat Conservation Plan
- Habitat conservation
- Habitat corridor
- Habitat destruction
- Habitat fragmentation
- Restoration ecology
