= Endangered Species Act Amendments of 1978 =

United States law

- Long title: An Act To amend the Endangered Species Act of 1973 to establish an Endangered Species Interagency Committee to review certain actions to determine whether exemptions from certain requirements of that Act should be granted for such actions.
- Acronyms (colloquial): ESA, God Squad
- Enacted by: the 95th United States Congress

Citations
- Public law: 95–632
- Statutes at Large: 92 Stat. 3751

Codification
- Titles amended: 16 U.S.C.: Conservation

Legislative history
- Introduced in the Senate as S. 2899 by John C. Culver (D–IA) on April 12, 1978; Committee consideration by United States Senate Committee on Environment and Public Works; Passed the Senate on July 19, 1978 (94-3); Passed the House on October 14, 1978 (384-12, in lieu of H.R. 14104); Signed into law by President Jimmy Carter on November 10, 1978

Major amendments
- Pub. L. 96–159, 93 Stat. 1225, enacted December 28, 1979; Pub. L. 97–304, 96 Stat. 1411, enacted October 13, 1982

The Endangered Species Act (ESA) was first passed in 1973 and forms the basis of biodiversity and endangered species protection in the United States. The original purpose of the Endangered Species Act of 1973 was to prevent species endangerment and extinction due to the human impact on natural ecosystems. The three most powerful sections of the ESA are Sections 4, 7 and 9. Section 4 allows the Secretaries of Interior and Commerce to list species as threatened or endangered based on best available data. Section 7 requires federal agencies to consult with Fish and Wildlife Service (FWS) or National Marine Fisheries Service (NMFS) before taking any action that may threaten a listed species. Section 9 forbids the taking of an endangered species. The first amendment to the ESA was passed by the 95th United States Congress in 1978 to "introduce some flexibility into the Endangered Species Act".

== The snail darter ==
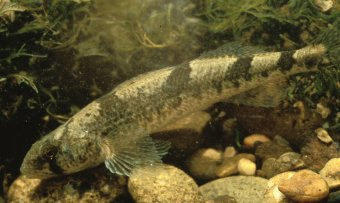
Snail darter, Percina tanasi

The snail darter case was an important test case of the ESA because it made Congress realize how powerful the ESA really was. In 1966, the Tennessee Valley Authority began construction on the Tellico Dam on the Little Tennessee River. For years, environmentalists tried to shut down the project, but their actions were unsuccessful until the discovery of the snail darter, a small fish that feeds off aquatic snails. The snail darter was listed as an endangered species in 1975 and part of the Little Tennessee River was designated as critical habitat. The completion of the Tellico Dam threatened the survival of the snail darter, which was thought to be native only to the Little Tennessee River. In 1976, battle in the courts between the Tennessee Valley Authority and environmentalists began over the fate of the snail darter. Over the next three years, the decision was appealed all the way to the Supreme Court. In Tennessee Valley Authority v. Hill the U.S. Supreme Court ruled in favor of protecting the species "whatever the cost". The Endangered Species Act was clear in stating that no federal project should be exempt from the provisions of Section 7.

== The whooping crane and weakening the ESA ==
Starting in the spring of 1977, members of Congress made several attempts to pass legislation that weakened the ESA. Many large business interest groups, including the mining and timber industries, also spoke out against the power of the ESA. Beginning in April 1978, the Senate Subcommittee on Resources Protection began debating and developing a bill that would create a committee with power to exempt federal actions from Section 7 requirements. On April 12, 1978 Senator John Culver (D-IA) and Senate Minority Leader Howard Baker (R-TN) introduced a bill that would create a seven-member Cabinet-level committee with the authority to exempt a federal agency from Section 7 requirements.

Meanwhile, in Wheatland, Wyoming, a consortium of energy utilities were attempting to build the Grayrocks Dam on the Laramie River to supply a coal-fired power plant. Upset that water diversion would threaten the critically endangered whooping crane, on October 2, 1978, the Nebraska Attorney General’s office obtained a federal injunction barring the dam. Grayrocks, however, enjoyed strong support in Congress, and by October 14 Teno Roncalio (D-WY) convinced the House to pass a bill exempting the dam from all federal regulation. In lieu of that, Senator Culver (D-IA) adapted the bill to his own attempts to exempt the snail darter, creating the Endangered Species Committee and required the committee to decide on an exemption from protections of the snail darter and the whooping crane within 30 days. Both the House of Representatives and Senate voted to amend the ESA, and on November 10 President Jimmy Carter signed the amendment into law. On December 4, Nebraska reached a settlement under which the power utilities would get to build Grayrocks dam by agreeing to purchase some habitat for the whooping crane. On January 23, 1979, the Endangered Species Committee met for the first time, refused to exempt the snail darter from protection, and granted Grayrocks an exemption from the whooping crane protections.

== The amendment of 1978 and the "God Squad" ==
The 1978 amendment to the ESA "attempts to retain the basic integrity of the ESA, while introducing some flexibility which will permit exemptions from the Act's stringent requirements." The amendment clarified the ESA of 1973 in many ways, including clearly defining the term critical habitat, clearly defining penalties for non-compliance and determining the future appropriation of funds. The most important change that was brought about by the 1978 amendment was the creation of the Endangered Species Committee, known as the "God Squad" because of the substantial impact of its decisions on the natural world.

The God Squad is a committee composed of six permanent Cabinet-level members: The administrator of the Environmental Protection Agency, the administrator of National Oceanic and Atmospheric Administration, the chairman of the Council of Economic Advisers, the Secretary of Agriculture, the Secretary of the Army, and the Secretary of the Interior. One or more temporary members, sharing a single vote, may also be appointed by the President to represent any states that are affected by the exemption in question. This committee has the authority to exempt a project or action from Section 7 requirements, which otherwise prohibit actions that are "likely to jeopardize the continued existence" of a listed species or its habitat. To exempt an action, at least five members must vote in favor of the exemption. The following conditions must be met for an action to be considered for exemption:

1. there must be no reasonable alternative to the agency's action
2. the benefits of the action must outweigh the benefits of an alternative action where the species is conserved
3. the action is of regional or national importance
4. neither the federal agency or the exemption applicant made irreversible commitment to the resources.

Additionally, mitigation efforts must be taken to reduce the negative effects on the endangered species.

The amendments also contain provisions for the Secretary of Defense or the President to authorize exemptions, in cases of national security or disaster situations respectively. Conversely, the Secretary of State may overrule exemptions if they are found to violate any international treaties.

== God Squad decisions ==
=== Northern spotted owl ===
In 1991, a federal judge ordered the halting of logging on Pacific Northwest national lands because of the threat to the northern spotted owl. Following this action, the Bureau of Land Management (BLM) filed for exemption from Section 7. The northern spotted owl is a medium-sized bird that is dependent on old-growth forest and large territories for survival. The BLM came up with a solution that allowed logging to continue in the area, which included the sale of timber on 44 timber tracts to the logging industry. The 44 tracts totaled 4400 acres (18 km^{2}) of land. The God Squad convened and discussed the issue. In a 5:2 vote, the God Squad voted for approval of the exemption in thirteen of the sales where there was no reasonable alternative to the sale. However, the exemption was soon overturned when Judge Stephen Reinhardt on the Ninth Circuit Court of Appeals found it had been illegal for the President to talk to his cabinet about the exemption.

The environmentalists and the BLM agreed on a compromise that allowed the timber sale to continue. The BLM would develop a Long Range Forest Management Plan that would need to be approved by the FWS before any future timber sales. When the Clinton administration came into office, they withdrew the exemption request and convened a conference resulting in appointment of the Forest Ecosystem Management Assessment Team (FEMAT). The FEMAT was created to develop a plan to protect the owl while still maintaining logging and forest management across the region. FEMAT and the Clinton administration agreed to protect 10 million acres (40,000 km^{2}) of old growth forest for the owl, while limiting logging to 1 billion board feet (2,400,000 m^{3}) per year.

=== Gulf of Mexico fossil fuel industry ===
On March 31, 2026, a meeting of the God Squad voted to exempt oil and gas mining companies operating in the Gulf of Mexico from the Endangered Species Act, on unspecified national security grounds. The decision was requested by US Secretary of Defense Pete Hegseth. A similar announcement earlier in the month resulted in a lawsuit that adequate public notice was not provided. Environmental advocates were concerned the decision could cause the extinction of Rice's whale, which only lives in the Gulf of Mexico and is critically endangered after population loss caused by the Deepwater Horizon oil spill. This decision overrides mitigation measures such as slowing down boats in whale habitat, keeping a safe distance from whales, and using quieter air guns for seismic surveys.
