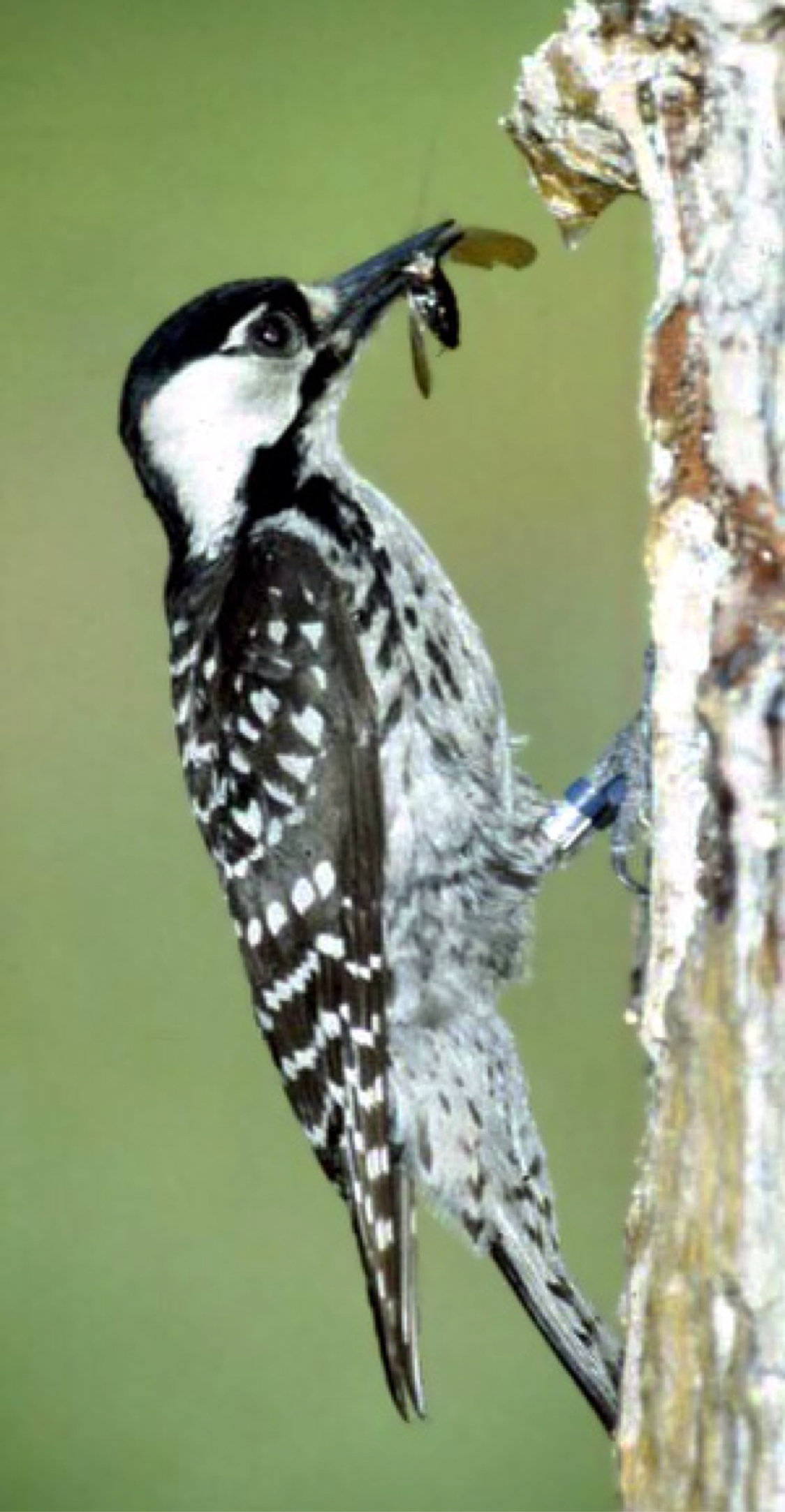
- Female with insect prey in mouth

Conservation status
- Near Threatened (IUCN 3.1)

- Vulnerable (NatureServe)

Scientific classification
- Kingdom: Animalia
- Phylum: Chordata
- Class: Aves
- Order: Piciformes
- Family: Picidae
- Genus: Leuconotopicus
- Species: L. borealis

Binomial name
- Leuconotopicus borealis (Vieillot, 1809)
- Current range

Synonyms
- Dendrocopos borealis borealis (Vieillot, 1809); Picoides borealis hylonomus (Wetmore, 1941); Dryobates borealis (Vieillot, 1809); Dendrocopos borealis hylonomus (Wetmore, 1941); Picoides borealis borealis (Vieillot, 1809); Dendrocopos borealis (Vieillot, 1809); Picoides borealis (Vieillot, 1809)

= Red-cockaded woodpecker =

Species of bird

The red-cockaded woodpecker (Leuconotopicus borealis) is a woodpecker endemic to the southeastern United States. It is a threatened species under the Endangered Species Act of 1973.

== Description ==
The red-cockaded woodpecker is small- to mid-sized species, being intermediate in size between North America's two most widespread woodpeckers (the downy and hairy woodpeckers). This species measures 18–23 cm (7.1–9.1 in) in length, spans 34–41 cm (13–16 in) across the wings and weighs 40–56 g (1.4–2.0 oz). Among the standard measurements, the wing chord is 9.5–12.6 cm (3.7–5.0 in), the tail is 7–8.2 cm (2.8–3.2 in), the bill is 1.9–2.3 cm (0.75–0.91 in) and the tarsus is 1.8–2.2 cm (0.71–0.87 in). Its back is barred with black and white horizontal stripes. The red-cockaded woodpecker's most distinguishing feature is a black cap and nape that encircle large white cheek patches. Rarely visible, except perhaps during the breeding season and periods of territorial defense, the male has a small red streak on each side of its black cap called a cockade, hence its name. The species is listed as Near Threatened by the IUCN and as Threatened by the United States Fish and Wildlife Service.

== Behavior ==
The red-cockaded woodpecker feeds primarily on ants, beetles, cockroaches, caterpillars, wood-boring insects, and spiders, and occasionally fruit and berries. The vast majority of foraging is on pines, with a strong preference for large trees, though they will occasionally forage on hardwoods and even on corn earworms in cornfields.

Red-cockaded woodpeckers are a territorial, nonmigratory, cooperative breeding species, frequently having the same mate for several years. The nesting season runs from April to June. The breeding female lays three to four eggs in the breeding male's roost cavity. Group members incubate the small white eggs for 10–13 days. Once hatched, the nestlings remain in the nest cavity for about 26–29 days. Upon fledging, the young often remain with the parents, forming groups of up to nine or more members, but more typically three to four members. There is only one pair of breeding birds within each group, and they normally only raise a single brood each year. The other group members, called helpers, usually males from the previous breeding season, help incubate the eggs and raise the young. Juvenile females generally leave the group before the next breeding season, in search of solitary male groups. The main predators of red-cockaded nests are rat snakes, although corn snakes also represent a threat. Studies have also explored the possibility that southern flying squirrels might have a negative impact on red-cockaded woodpecker populations due competition over cavities and predation on eggs and nestlings.

The red-cockaded woodpecker is a cavity-nester. They excavate cavities in live pine trees, favoring the longleaf pine. The tree selected must be of large enough diameter to physically house a cavity, as heartwood does not pose the hazard of resin seepage, which can lethally trap the bird in a cavity. It can take the birds anywhere from under a year to several decades to excavate a cavity. Cavity excavation in longleaf pine takes an average of 4.4 years to complete. Excavation times have high variance, most influenced by the start and advanced stages of excavation, where the physical characteristics of the tree affect cavity excavation most. Once completed, the cavity can remain in use for decades.

For decades, academic literature has strongly suggested a link between red-cockaded woodpeckers and various fungi that cause heart rot in pine trees. It was previously thought that the bird specifically selects for trees infected with Porodaedalea pini for cavity excavation. A recent study suggests that red-cockaded woodpeckers play a dominant or exclusive role in transferring various Basidiomycota fungi from active cavities to cavity starts, including wood decay fungi. The most prevalent Basidiomycota found in cavities and cavity starts are Exobasidiomycetes sp. 2 and P. pini, both of which were found on the bird, though P. pini was only detected on one bird of 11 swabbed in this study. The implications of these findings are not yet understood.

In cavity trees that are actively being used, red-cockaded woodpeckers maintain small resin wells which exude sap around the cavity entrance. Longleaf pines produce more resin than other pine species, another reason they are the most-used cavity tree for the bird. This resin flow often extends several meters below the cavity entrance. The resin flow acts as a defense mechanism against rat snakes and possibly other predators. The coating of resin makes the bark of the cavity tree smoother, providing less purchase for snakes to climb the tree. Additionally, it was found that resin adhering to the snakes' ventral scales as they climb reduces mobility important for a snakes' climbing motion.

In addition to active roost cavities, red-cockaded woodpecker colonies maintain a number of cavity starts. These are incomplete cavity excavations which they continue to excavate over time.

The primary predators of the red-cockaded woodpecker are snakes and southern flying squirrels. While snakes are one of the primary predators of red-cockaded woodpeckers, they also indirectly benefit the birds by predating on flying squirrels.

== Distribution and habitat ==
Historically, this woodpecker's range extended in the southeastern United States from Florida to New Jersey and Maryland, as far west as eastern Texas and Oklahoma, and inland to Missouri, Kentucky, and Tennessee. Today it is estimated that there are about 5,000 groups of red-cockaded woodpeckers, or 12,500 birds, from Florida to Virginia and west to southeast Oklahoma and eastern Texas, representing about one percent of the woodpecker's original population (over 1 million individuals at one point). They have become locally extinct (extirpated) in Kentucky, Maryland, Missouri, New Jersey, and Tennessee.

The red-cockaded woodpecker makes its home in fire-dependent pine savannas. Longleaf pines (Pinus palustris) are most commonly preferred, but other species of southern pine are also acceptable. While other woodpeckers bore out cavities in dead trees where the wood is rotten and soft, the red-cockaded woodpecker is the only one that excavates cavities exclusively in living pine trees. The older pines favored by the red-cockaded woodpecker often suffer from a fungal infection called red heart rot which attacks the center of the trunk, causing the inner wood, the heartwood, to become soft. Cavities are generally excavated over 1 to 3 years.

The aggregate of cavity trees is called a cluster and may include 1 to 20 or more cavity trees on 3 to 60 acres (12,000 to 240,000 m^{2}). The average cluster is about 10 acres (40,000 m^{2}). The typical territory for a group ranges from about 125 to 200 acres (500,000 to 800,000 m^{2}), but observers have reported territories running from a low of around 60 acres (240,000 m^{2}), to an upper extreme of more than 600 acres (2.40 km^{2}). The size of a particular territory is related to both habitat suitability and population density. Where red-cockaded woodpeckers occur at high densities, individuals appear to spend more time in territorial defense, potentially at the expense of foraging and time allocated to reproduction, resulting in reduced clutch size and fledgling production.

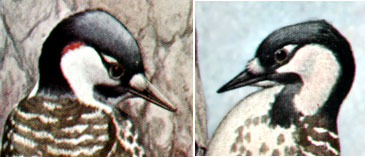
Detail of head

== Ecology ==
The red-cockaded woodpecker is a keystone species in southern pine forest ecosystems. Their cavities are used secondarily by at least 27 species of vertebrates, including small birds (e.g., eastern bluebirds, tufted titmouse, and great crested flycatcher), mammals (e.g., evening bat), herpetofauna (e.g., broad-headed skinks, gray treefrogs), and invertebrates (e.g., wasps, bees, moths, and ants).

Pileated woodpeckers (Dryocopus pileatus), often enlarge cavities created by red-cockaded woodpeckers, making the tree uninhabitable to the red-cockaded woodpecker, but providing habitat for larger birds like eastern screech owls, wood ducks, and American kestrels. Smaller animals, like the red-bellied woodpecker, red-headed woodpecker, and southern flying squirrel may compete with red-cockaded woodpeckers for unenlarged nests.

== Conservation ==
The red-cockaded woodpecker suffers from habitat fragmentation when habitable pines are removed. When a larger cluster of birds gets split up, it is difficult for the young to find mates and eventually becomes an issue regarding species dispersal. While dispersing in search of new places to settle, the red-cockaded woodpecker encounters habitats of competing woodpecker species.

The red-cockaded woodpecker has been the focus of conservation efforts even before the passing of the Endangered Species Act in 1973. In Florida, pairs are being released at DuPuis Management Area and other privately owned land.

Due to the high importance of nesting habitat on the woodpecker's reproduction, much management has been dedicated to create ideal and more numerous nesting sites. Nesting clusters have been spared from forestry activity to preserve old-growth, large diameter trees. The nesting sites themselves have also been managed to make them more appealing. The use of controlled burning has been used to reduce deciduous growth around nesting colonies. The red-cockaded woodpecker has been shown to prefer nesting sites with less deciduous growth. The use of controlled burning must be exercised with caution due to the highly flammable resin barriers formed by the woodpecker.

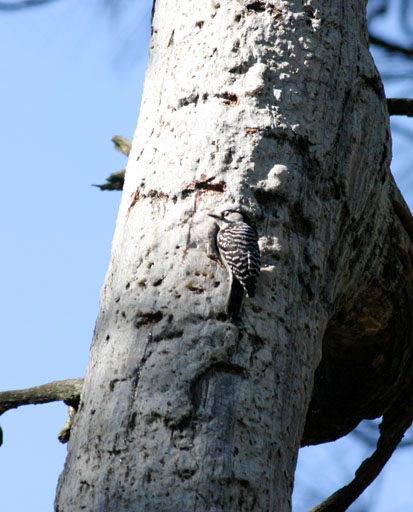
Male at nest cavity in longleaf pine

In an effort to increase the red-cockaded woodpecker population, states such as Texas, Louisiana, Alabama, and Georgia's wildlife management are creating artificial cavities in longleaf pine trees. There are two methods in which wildlife management officers use to insert cavities in long leaf pines. The most respected and latest approach is to carve out a nesting cavity in the tree and insert a man-made rot-resistant wooden box with a PVC pipe small enough for only a red-cockaded woodpecker to fit through. These boxes, also known as "inserts", can last up to 10 years. The older and less used approach is to drill a cavity into the tree in hopes that the birds will settle there and nest.

Due to the energetically expensive process of excavating new cavities, more energy is expended competing for existing home ranges rather than colonizing new areas. Cavities are highly sought-out resources by all cavity dwelling species and red-cockadeds have been observed roosting in them as early as the same night the boxes are installed. Alpha males usually reside in the best cavity, alpha females in the second best cavity until breeding season when their male partners allow their cavity to turn into the nest cavity. Juveniles are left with the lower quality cavities or no cavities at all, forcing them to roost on a branch outside overnight. Due to the fact that each family member requires a cavity to roost, land managers may choose to insert additional artificial cavities to boost survival of juveniles. Red-cockaded woodpeckers will even recolonize abandoned ranges when cavities are created.

In addition to the creation of new cavities, methods for protecting existing cavities are also used. The most common technique employed is a restrictor plate. The plate prevents other species from enlarging or changing the shape of the cavity entrance. These restrictor plates must be carefully monitored, however, to ensure that no hindrance is given to the woodpecker. Adjustments must also be made as the tree grows. Southern flying squirrel exclusion devices may be considered as well. A study suggested that managers establish new woodpecker clusters away from streams and limit the use of excess cavities, both factors important in the recruitment of flying squirrels. Application of capsaicin on flying squirrel at cavities could be a cost-effective method.

== See also ==
- Babbitt v. Sweet Home Chapter of Communities for a Great Oregon
