= Stargazing darter =

Conservation status
- Near Threatened (IUCN 3.1)

Scientific classification
- Kingdom: Animalia
- Phylum: Chordata
- Class: Actinopterygii
- Order: Perciformes
- Family: Percidae
- Genus: Percina
- Species: P. uranidea

Binomial name
- Percina uranidea (Jordan & Gilbert, 1887)

Synonyms
- Etheostoma uranidea Jordan & Gilbert, 1887; ?Percina tanasi Etnier, 1976

Species of fish

The stargazing darter (Percina uranidea) is a species of freshwater ray-finned fish, a darter from the subfamily Etheostomatinae, part of the family Percidae, which also contains the perches, ruffes and pikeperches. It is endemic to the United States.

In 2025, the snail darter (Percina tanasi), known for its political significance in the snail darter controversy, was determined to be an allopatric eastern population of Percina uranidea. This would expand the distribution of the stargazing darter to the eastern Tennessee River drainage.

== Geographic distribution ==
Found in the St. Francis, White and Ouachita River drainages in Missouri, Arkansas and Louisiana; formerly in lower the Wabash River in Indiana and Illinois, where now extirpated. If the snail darter also belongs to this species, as determined by phylogenetic studies, then the species also inhabits the eastern Tennessee River drainage in Tennessee, Alabama, and Georgia. This eastern population (as the snail darter) was considered endangered and even nearly extirpated for a period of time, but has since seen significant recovery due to Endangered Species Act protections.
