= Snail darter controversy =

Environmental controversy in Tennessee, United States

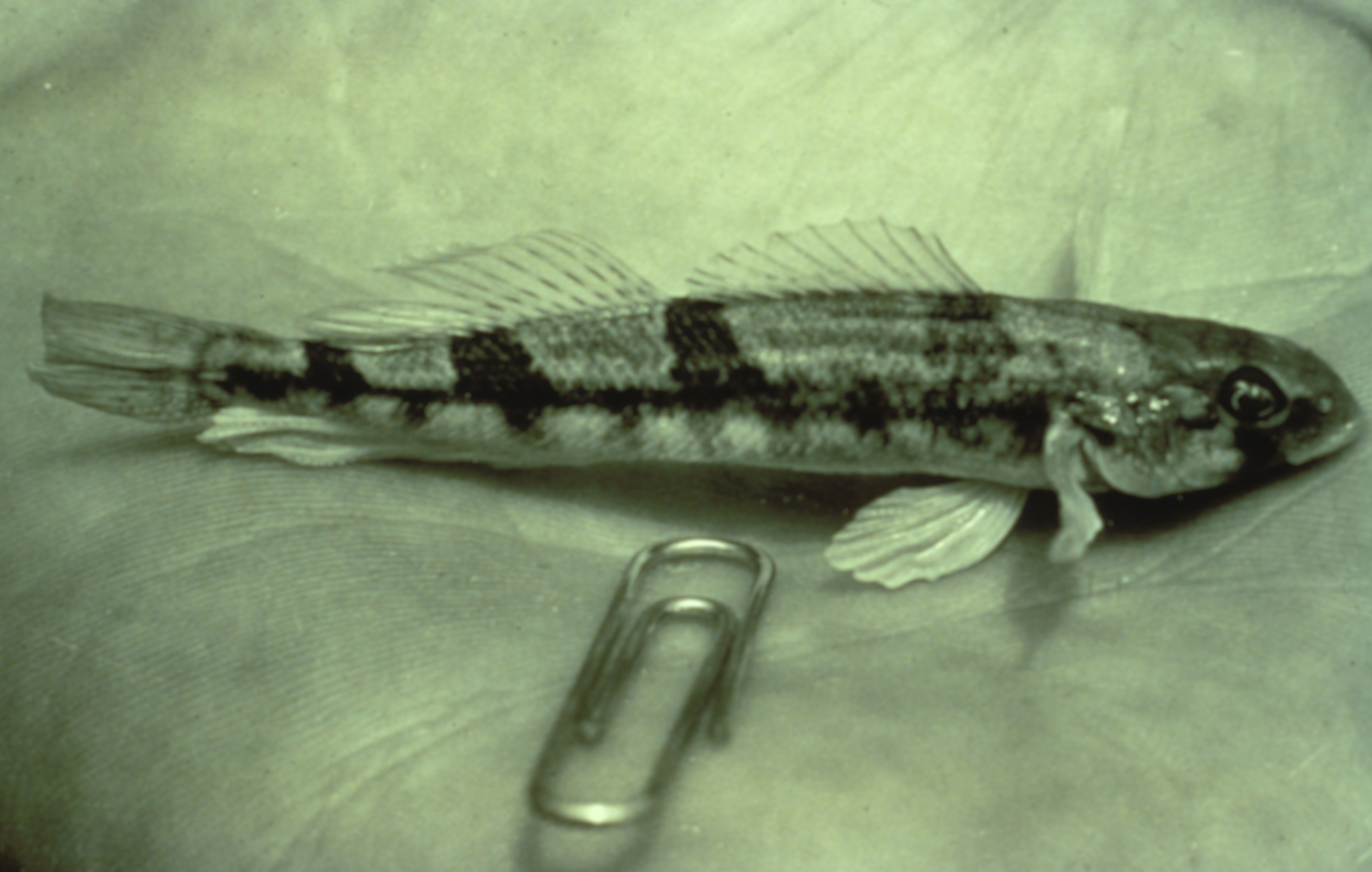
Snail darter, Percina tanasi

The snail darter controversy relates to the discovery in 1973 of an endangered species during the construction of the Tellico Dam on the Little Tennessee River. The dam project had been authorized in 1959 and construction begun in 1967 ("Tellico Dam") before passage of protective environmental legislation (e.g., Endangered Species Act). On August 12, 1973, University of Tennessee biologist and professor David Etnier discovered the snail darter in the Little Tennessee River while doing a reconnaissance snorkel survey in an effort to document the fish community that existed prior to the impending destruction of the pristine riverine habitat (Etnier 1976.).

Shortly thereafter, Congress passed the Endangered Species Act (ESA, 28 December, 1973).

Believing the snail darter to be uniquely different from any closely related species, Etnier began the process of publishing a formal scientific description that explicitly compared/contrasted physical features of the fish against the most likely closely related taxon, the Stargazing Darter (Percina uranidea) (Etnier, 1976). Even before the formal description was published, USFWS was petitioned to list the snail darter as endangered, and that was put into effect in November 1975.

Environmental Defense Fund lawyers were litigating a case against TVA on behalf of land owners and the Eastern Band Cherokee Tribe whose land was being taken under the principles of eminent domain (“Tellico Dam”). This lawsuit was brought under the National Environmental Policy Act (NEPA), and was based on the lack of a suitable Environmental Impact Statement for the Tellico project (as required by NEPA). The EDF lawyers declined to include any arguments related to the snail darter in their case. The NEPA lawsuit was ultimately dismissed when TVA presented an EIS prior to going to trial.

Once the ESA was passed, faculty and students in the University of Tennessee Law School filed a lawsuit against TVA (Tennessee Valley Authority v. Hill). The lawsuit said that the Tellico Reservoir, to be created by Tellico Dam, would alter the habitat of the river to the point of killing off the endangered snail darter.

The NEPA and ESA lawsuits delayed the construction of the Tellico Dam. The Supreme Court upheld protection for the snail darter under ESA, but Congress passed legislation specifically exempting the Tellico Dam Project from the ESA (“Tellico Dam”). The dam project and inundation of the reservoir were completed in 1979. Despite this setback, populations of the Tellico snail darters were translocated into other rivers, and new populations of the snail darter were discovered in other parts of the Tennessee River. The species status was upgraded from “endangered” to “threatened” in 1984 (USFWS 2013 ) and was eventually taken off the Endangered Species list in 2022 following significant recovery (USFWS).

Subsequent research indicates that the snail darter represents an eastern population of the stargazing darter, which is not endangered. This recent research states that it is unknown if that designation would have afforded the Little Tennessee River population of snail darters protections against the Tellico Project under provisions of the ESA, as either a unique sub-species or as a “distinct population segment”.

== US Supreme Court decision ==
The United States Congress had been inconsistent regarding the snail darter and the Endangered Species Act. Appropriations committees in both the House and Senate had taken a strong position against stopping the dam and reservoir project in order to protect the snail darter. A 1977 Senate Appropriations Committee report stated:

This committee has not viewed the Endangered Species Act as preventing the completion and use of these projects which were well under way at the time the affected species were listed as endangered. If the act has such an effect, which is contrary to the Committee's understanding of the intent of Congress in enacting the Endangered Species Act, funds should be appropriated to allow these projects to be completed and their benefits realized in the public interest, the Endangered Species Act not withstanding.

The case eventually reached the U.S. Supreme Court. In Tennessee Valley Authority v. Hill, 437 U.S. 153 (1978), Chief Justice Warren Burger wrote for the majority. The court replied to the Tennessee Valley Authority's arguments and expanded on its decision:

- The language of the Act made no exceptions for projects like Tellico that were well under way when Congress passed the act.
- It is clear from the Act's legislative history that Congress intended to halt and reverse the trend toward species extinction. The pointed omission of the type of qualified language previously included in endangered species legislation reveals a conscious congressional design to give endangered species priority over the "primary missions" of federal agencies. Congress, moreover, foresaw that on occasion this would require agencies to alter ongoing projects in order to fulfill the Act's goals.
- Though statements in Appropriations Committee Reports expressed the view of the Committees either that the Act did not apply to Tellico or that the dam should be completed regardless of the Act's provisions, nothing in the TVA appropriations measures passed by Congress said that the Tellico project was to be completed regardless of the Act's requirements. When voting on appropriations measures, legislators are entitled to assume that the funds will be devoted to purposes that are lawful and not for any purpose forbidden. A contrary policy would violate the rules of both Houses of Congress, which provide that appropriations measures may not change existing substantive law. An appropriations committee's expression does not operate to repeal or modify substantive legislation.
- Completion of the Tellico Dam project would violate the Act, so the Court of Appeals did not err by ordering the project to be enjoined. Congress has spoken in the plainest words, making it clear that endangered species are to be accorded the highest priorities. Since that legislative power has been exercised, it is up to the executive branch to administer the law and for the Judiciary to enforce it when, as here, enforcement has been sought.

Burger's opinion emphasized that, as written, the Endangered Species Act explicitly forbade the completion of such projects as Tellico if the Secretary of Interior had determined that such a project would likely result in the elimination of a species. Although more than $100 million had been spent on the project by 1978, and the dam was substantially finished, the court could not allow the TVA to finish the project. According to Burger, this would force the court "to ignore the ordinary meaning of plain language."

Supporters of the dam project, who believed that it would serve a much larger public good than protection of the snail darter, reacted in an effort to rework the Endangered Species Act. In his book The Fishes of Tennessee' David Etnier later wrote: "the snail darter had become almost a household word, and in current usage 'snail darter types' is approximately synonymous with 'ultra-liberal environmental activists.'"

== Two Tennessee legislators get involved ==
Congressman John Duncan, Sr., whose district included Tellico, and Senator Howard Baker. Duncan had been a long-time congressional supporter of the project. On the other hand, Baker had not taken a position before.

Howard Baker was a leading sponsor of an amendment to the Endangered Species Act that was passed into law in November 1978. The idea was to create a mechanism whereby a specific project could be excluded from the Endangered Species Act. If a controversy arose, the amendment called for the creation of a special committee consisting of various Cabinet level members and at least one member from the affected state where the project in question was located. It came to be known as the "God Committee" because if they exercised their power to exempt a project from the act, they were in effect acting like God and allowing destruction of an entire species.

There was a fear by project supporters in Congress that many projects in the country would be affected by litigation as biologists might set out to discover obscure species, including insects or even micro-biotic life forms. The proponents of the "God Committee" amendment believed it could be a means to protect the Endangered Species Act. According to the Burger opinion, U.S. endangered species laws at that time "represented the most comprehensive legislation for the preservation of endangered species ever enacted by any nation".

But, instead of granting Tellico an exemption from the Endangered Species Act, the committee voted unanimously in favor of the snail darter, largely finding that the dam project had poor economic issues. On January 23, 1979, the Committee unanimously denied an exemption for Tellico, specifically on economic grounds, rather than ecological grounds. "I hate to see the snail darter get the credit for stopping a project that was ill-conceived and uneconomic in the first place," said Chairman Andrus. The reservoir project deserved to be killed on its own merits. As Charles Schultze, Chairman of the Council of Economic Advisors and a member of the Committee, said, "Here is a project that is 95% complete, and if one takes the cost of finishing it against the total project benefits, and does it properly, it doesn't pay, which says something about the original design."

The opposition made much of the problematic benefit-cost issue throughout the 1970s. Despite his credentials as one of the nation's top economists, however, Schultze was no more prepared to accurately predict future benefits than anyone else at the time. Wheeler and McDonald state the problem was TVA's general unfamiliarity with the econometric models used to come up with benefit-cost ratios. Such models require some underlying assumptions.

Wheeler and McDonald identified five general assumptions which TVA used and declared them all to be false. They were:

(1) The Tellico area would remain economically static without the project. (2) All economic projects that occurred in the area after completion of the project should be attributed to the project. (3) If an economic benefit could take place at Tellico, then it would. (4) The Tellico Project would not detract from any economic benefits already being enjoyed in the area. (5) Once set, costs would not rise faster than the normal annual inflation rate of the early 1960s.

Congress had updated and strengthened the Endangered Species Act in 1973. Tellico Dam opponents had successfully sued under the provisions of that law to stop the dam. The Supreme Court had stated that as written, it was clear that Congress intended to protect all species, including the snail darter. In 1978 Congress amended the law, with the case of the snail darter specifically in mind.

Baker drafted an amendment to the Endangered Species Act that excluded the Tellico project. He attempted to satisfy arguments of the federal courts. Duncan gained passage of the amendment by the House on June 18, 1979, on a voice vote. The vote became infamous among dam opponents. Baker introduced the amendment in the Senate on July 17 and was defeated on a vote of 45–53. Undeterred, Baker reintroduced the amendment in September. Baker spoke in favor of his amendment on the Senate floor:

Mr. President, I hope this is the last time around. I hope we can resolve this issue once and for all, and I hope reason will finally prevail. . . .

Mr. President, the awful beast is back. The Tennessee snail darter, the bane of my existence, the nemesis of my golden years, the bold perverter of the Endangered Species Act is back.

He is still insisting that the Tellico Dam on the Little Tennessee River, a dam that is now 99% complete, be destroyed.

In the midst of a national energy crisis, the snail darter demands that we scuttle a project that would produce 200 million kilowatt hours of hydroelectric power and save an estimated 15 million gallons of oil.

Although other residences have been found in which he can thrive serenely, the snail darter stubbornly insists on keeping this particular stretch of the Little Tennessee River as his principal domicile. ...

Let me stress again, Mr. President, that this is fine with me. I have nothing personal against the snail darter. He seems to be quite a nice little fish, as fish go.

Now seriously Mr. President, the snail darter has become an unfortunate example of environmental extremism, and this kind of extremism, if rewarded and allowed to persist, will spell the doom to the environmental protection movement in this country more surely and more quickly than anything else. ...

We who voted for the Endangered Species Act with the honest intentions of protecting such glories of nature as the wolf, the eagle, and other treasures have found that extremists with wholly different motives are using this noble act for meanly obstructive ends. ...

On September 10, 1979, Baker's amendment passed on a vote of 48 to 44. Twenty-eight Republicans and 20 Democrats supported it. Ten Republicans and 34 Democrats opposed it. On September 25, 1979, President Jimmy Carter signed the bill that exempted the Tellico Dam from the Endangered Species Act.

== Aftermath ==
On November 29, 1979, with retired TVA Chairman Red Wagner watching, the TVA closed the gates on the Tellico Dam to begin inundation of the Tellico Reservoir. Before this action, numerous snail darters were transplanted into the Hiwassee River in Tennessee. The snail darter was reclassified from endangered to threatened on July 5, 1984. It was delisted by the U.S. Fish and Wildlife Service effective November 4, 2022 after achievement of recovery criteria and the finding of additional populations within the Tennessee River drainage.

As mentioned above, a 2025 study suggests that the snail darter actually represents an eastern population of the stargazing darter, a more westerly-distributed species that is not endangered. As part of the media coverage related to the publication release date, one of the authors (Thomas J. Near) stated in an interview that the original descriptors of the species may have “squinted their eyes a bit” when describing it as a way to fight the dam, and that it may have possibly been intentionally described as distinct due to the downstream conservation impacts of its description. Etnier himself acknowledged that genetic affinities between snail darters and stargazing darters would be instrumental in fully understanding their degree of relatedness and divergence (Etnier, 1976, p. 487).

== See also ==
- Tennessee Valley Authority v. Hill

== General and cited references ==
- U.S. Senate Report Number 95-301, (1977): 99.
- Jim Range, telephone interview with Jim Breitinger, February 27, 2001. Master's thesis, University of Utah, 2001.
- Congressional Record – Senate S12274, September 10, 1979.
