= Tennessee Valley Authority v. Hill =

- Supreme Court of the United States

Argued April 18, 1978 Decided June 15, 1978
- Full case name: Tennessee Valley Authority v. Hill, et al.
- Citations: 437 U.S. 153 (more) 98 S. Ct. 2279; 57 L. Ed. 2d 117; 1978 U.S. LEXIS 33; 11 ERC (BNA) 1705; 8 ELR 20513;
- Argument: Oral argument

Case history
- Prior: Injunction denied, 419 F. Supp. 753, 757 (E.D. Tenn. 1976), reversed, 549 F.2d 1064, 1069 (6th Cir. 1977). TVA petitioned for Writ of Certiorari from U.S. Supreme Court which was granted in November 1977.
- Subsequent: 84 F.R.D. 226 (E.D. Tenn. 1979)

Holding
- Supreme Court affirmed the Sixth Circuit judgement and ordered an injunction against the completion of the Tellico Dam citing the project impact would violate provisions stated in Section 7 of the Endangered Species Act.

Court membership
- Chief Justice Warren E. Burger Associate Justices William J. Brennan Jr. · Potter Stewart; Byron White · Thurgood Marshall; Harry Blackmun · Lewis F. Powell Jr. William Rehnquist · John P. Stevens

Case opinions
- Majority: Burger, joined by Brennan, Stewart, White, Marshall, Stevens
- Dissent: Powell, joined by Blackmun
- Dissent: Rehnquist

Laws applied
- Endangered Species Act

Tennessee Valley Authority v. Hiram Hill et al., or TVA v. Hill, 437 U.S. 153 (1978), was a United States Supreme Court case and the Court's first interpretation of the Endangered Species Act of 1973. After the discovery of the snail darter fish in the Little Tennessee River in August 1973, a lawsuit was filed alleging that the Tennessee Valley Authority (TVA)'s Tellico Dam construction was in violation of the Endangered Species Act. Plaintiffs argued dam construction would destroy critical habitat and endanger the population of snail darters. It was decided by a 6-3 vote, in which the U.S. Supreme Court ruled in favor of Hill, et al. and granted an injunction stating that there would be conflict between Tellico Dam operation and the explicit provisions of Section 7 of the Endangered Species Act.

The majority opinion, delivered by Chief Justice Warren E. Burger, affirmed the Sixth Circuit Court of Appeals decision in granting an injunction. This decision by the Supreme Court to not allow exemptions confirmed that Section 7 of the Endangered Species Act was a strong substantive provision and helped shape federal environmental law. The case is commonly cited as an example of the strict construction-plain meaning canon of construction, and the equitable principle that courts cannot balance equities to override statutory mandates unless on constitutional grounds.

== Background ==
=== History of Endangered Species Act ===
Passed by Congress a large majority in 531-4 vote and signed by President Richard Nixon on December 28, 1973 with the purpose of protecting and recovering "imperiled species and the ecosystems upon which they depend," the Endangered Species Act provides the strongest federal protection against species loss. The Endangered Species Act requires federal agencies to evaluate if actions taken or permitted by the federal government may harm listed species or the continued existence of listed species or their critical habitat. Once a species is listed as "endangered" or "threatened," the ESA prohibits the "taking" of listed animals and plants which makes it unlawful "to harass, harm, pursue, hunt, shoot, wound, kill, trap, capture, or collect or attempt to engage in any such conduct." Unknowingly at the time, Congress had passed a controversial statute that created a forum which brought into question the merits of government projects and presented a political question of balancing the benefits of species preservation and the economic cost of preservation.

=== Parties involved ===
==== Tennessee Valley Authority ====
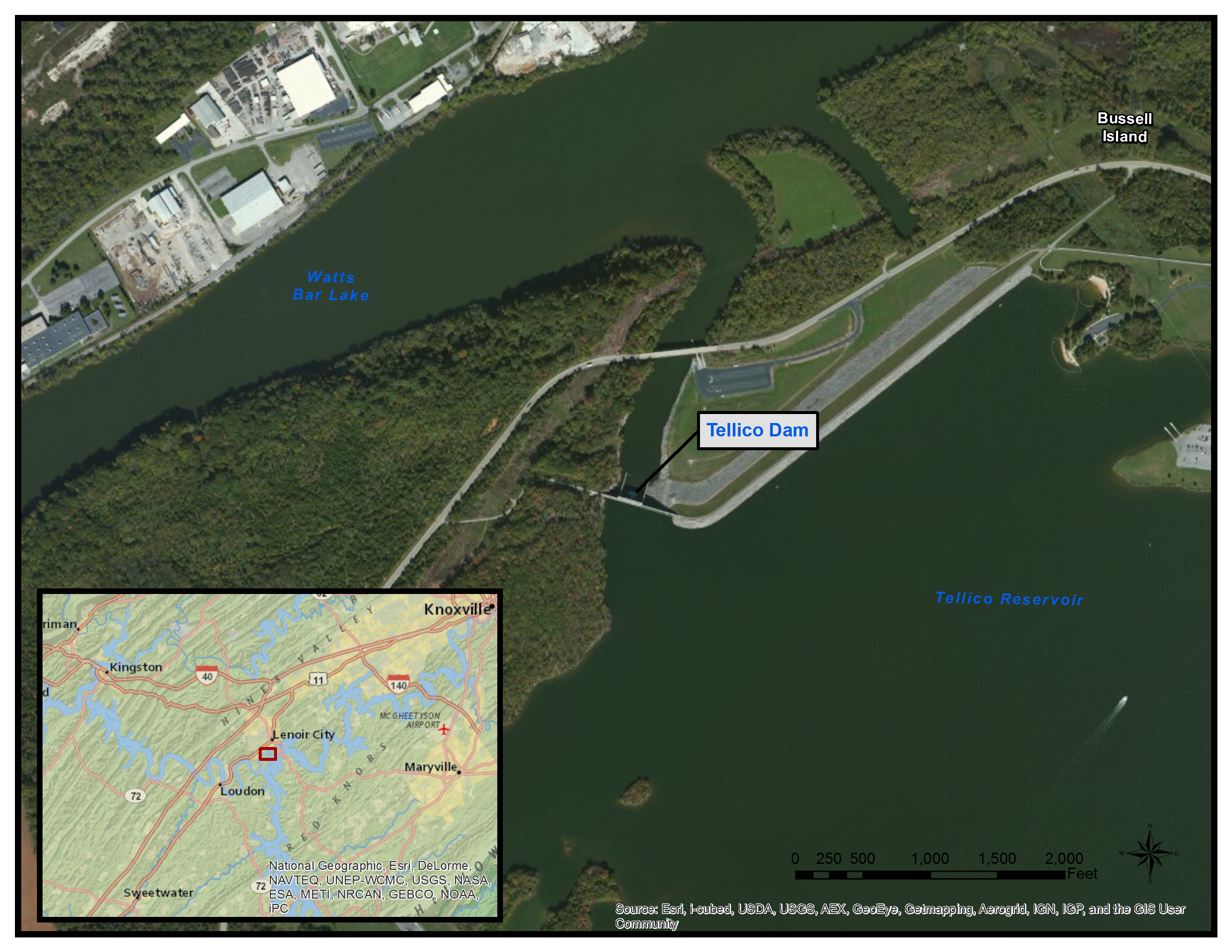
Location of Tellico Dam

The Tennessee Valley Authority is a federally owned utility corporation created in 1933 during the Great Depression. At the time of its creation, its mission was to help strengthen economic development of the Tennessee River basin, a region hit with high unemployment where the per capita income was less than half the national average. The publicly owned corporation provides flood control, navigation and land management for the Tennessee River system and assists utilities and state and local governments with economic development. The Tellico Dam project would be the last of 68 dams constructed in the Tennessee River Valley. TVA argued that the project would provide recreational benefits and allow for real estate development along the reservoir.

==== Hiram Hill, et al. ====
Hiram (Hank) Hill was a second year law student at the University of Tennessee. Hiram Hill was spending time with Dr. David Etnier, a biologist and professor, who had discovered the snail darter while scuba diving in the Little Tennessee River. Hill brought the snail darter to the attention of Zygmunt J.B. Plater, a law professor, and asked if the completion of the Tellico Dam and the potential effect on the fish under the Endangered Species Act would be a suitable topic for an environmental law paper. The plaintiffs in the case were Hill, Plater, and Donald Cohen.

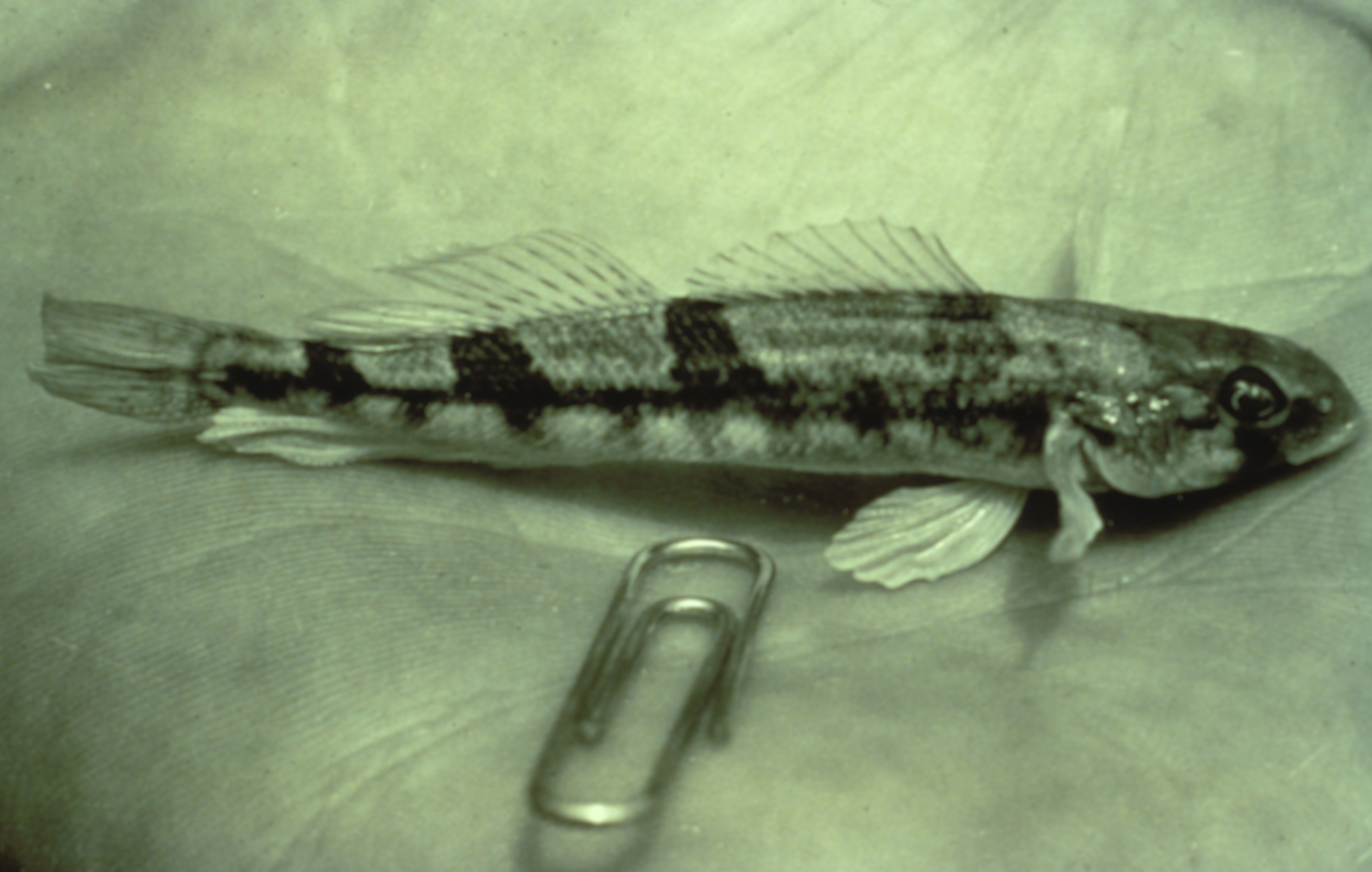
Snail darter, Percina tanasi

== Case ==
=== History of the case ===
In previous suits filed by Environmental Defense Fund under the National Environmental Policy Act (NEPA), TVA had been ordered by Judge Robert L. Taylor of the Eastern District of Tennessee to cease dam construction for 16 months until an environmental impact statement had been written. Congress continued to fund the project under the annual Public Works Appropriations Act and Judge Taylor dissolved the injunction after a year and dismissed the NEPA suit.

After the discovery of the snail darter, Hiram Hill, Zygmunt Plater, and local attorney Joseph Congleton submitted a petition to the Fish and Wildlife Service to list the snail darter as endangered. In the Federal Register, the FWS ruled that the species was indeed endangered and designated mile 0.5 to 17 of the Little Tennessee River as critical habitat for snail darters. TVA rejected the Fish and Wildlife Service's interpretation of ESA and continued to receive funding for the Tellico Dam.

On February 28, 1976 Hill et al., filed a citizen's suit seeking an injunction and claimed that TVA was in violation of the Endangered Species Act. Judge Taylor presided over the case and on May 25, 1976 he found that the dam would eliminate the fish and its habitat, but he refused to consider balancing the alternate development of the river, and refused to enjoin completion of the Tellico Dam.

On January 31, 1977 the Sixth Circuit Court of Appeals reversed Judge Taylor's decision and issued an injunction forbidding the completion of the dam. During this time TVA petitioned the FWS to remove the snail darter from the endangered species list and also petitioned for a writ of certiorari from the United States Supreme Court.

=== Issues ===
It was not disputed by either party that the completion of the dam would eradicate the known population of snail darters. The two issues of the case were as follows:

1. Whether completion of the Tellico Dam by the Tennessee Valley Authority would violate the Endangered Species Act. And, if so
2. Whether an injunction is required to halt construction of the dam.

=== Arguments ===
==== Arguments against an injunction ====
On April 18, 1978 TVA argued that an exception to the Endangered Species Act should be granted for balancing of equities. They argued that Congress had already spent $100 million on the project, and that it would not make economic sense to stop the project. TVA argued for an exception to be made in this case since the dam was started prior to the Endangered Species Act being passed and claimed it should be grandfathered in. Another argument made was that since the appropriations committees continued to appropriate funding for the project after knowing it would be detrimental to the snail darter's critical habitat, Congress had implicitly repealed the Endangered Species Act.

==== Arguments for an injunction ====
Section 7 of the Endangered Species Act offers no exceptions to the jeopardizing of the continued existence of listed endangered species or their habitat. Endangered species should be afforded the highest of priorities no matter the economic costs.

== Opinions of the Court ==
=== Majority opinion ===
The majority opinion was made by Chief Justice Burger, joined by justices William J. Brennan, Jr., Potter Stewart, Byron White, Thurgood Marshall, and John Paul Stevens was delivered on June 15, 1978. Burger affirmed that the Endangered Species Act is very clear in its wording:

One would be hard pressed to find a statutory provision whose terms were any plainer than those in 7 of the Endangered Species Act. Its very words affirmatively command all federal agencies 'to insure that actions authorized, funded, or carried out by them do not jeopardize the continued existence' of an endangered species or 'result in the destruction or modification of habitat of such species . . . .' 16 U.S.C. 1536 (1976 ed.). (Emphasis added.) This language admits of no exception.

Based on the wording of the Act, Congress viewed the value of an endangered species as incalculable. Until Congress decided otherwise, the courts should enforce the law, not allowing violations to continue.

To TVA's claim that Congress had implied repeal of the Endangered Species Act Burger wrote: "When voting on appropriations measures, legislators are entitled to operate under the assumption that the funds will be devoted to purposes which are lawful and not for any purpose forbidden."

=== Dissenting opinions ===
==== Dissenting Powell, joined by Blackmun ====
Justices Lewis F. Powell, Jr. and Harry Blackmun agreed with the majority opinion with the wording of the Endangered Species Act, but disagreed that there could not be exception.

...I view it as the duty of this Court to adopt a permissible construction that accords with some modicum of common sense and the public weal.

Powell thought it rationally followed that since the dam construction began before the ESA was passed, the statute did not apply to projects already underway.

==== Dissenting Rehnquist ====
Justice William Rehnquist agreed with the District Court in their refusal to issue an injunction.

Here the District Court recognized that Congress, when it enacted the Endangered Species Act, made the preservation of the habitat of the snail darter an important public concern. But it concluded that this interest on one side of the balance was more than outweighed by other equally significant factors. These factors, further elaborated in the dissent of my brother Powell, satisfy me that the District Court's refusal to issue an injunction was not an abuse of its discretion. I therefore dissent from the Court's opinion holding otherwise.

He agreed that TVA was in violation of the Endangered Species Act, but thought there should be a balancing of equities in this case. Just because they could issue an injunction, does not mean they had an absolute duty to do so.

== Subsequent developments ==
=== Congress amends the Endangered Species Act ===
Endangered Species Act Amendments of 1978 were introduced by Senators Howard Baker and John C. Culver. The subsequent amendments brought "some flexibility into the Endangered Species Act". As part of the amendment Congress created the Endangered Species Committee composed of seven senior officials:

- Administrator of the Environmental Protection Agency,
- Administrator of National Oceanic and Atmospheric Administration,
- Chairman of the Council of Economic Advisers,
- Secretary of Agriculture,
- Secretary of the Army,
- Secretary of the Interior, and
- a representative of the state in question.

The committee has the authority to exempt federal agencies from provisions in Section 7 of the Endangered Species Act. An exemption could be granted if a majority of the committee members found:

(a) the federal project is of regional or national significance,
(b) there is no "reasonable and prudent alternative," and
(c) the project as proposed "clearly outweighs the alternatives."

If approved, the extinction of a species would be allowed and the agency would be required to implement a mitigation plan.

The Tellico Dam project was reviewed by the so-called "God Committee" on January 23, 1979 and was unanimously denied an exemption based on economic factors. Chairman Andrus stated, "I hate to see the snail darter get the credit for stopping a project that was ill-conceived and uneconomic in the first place." The annual cost of the dam, $7.25 million, exceeded estimated benefits, $6.25 million, in addition to the cost of completing dam construction and also would tie up approximately $40 million in private (agricultural) land values.

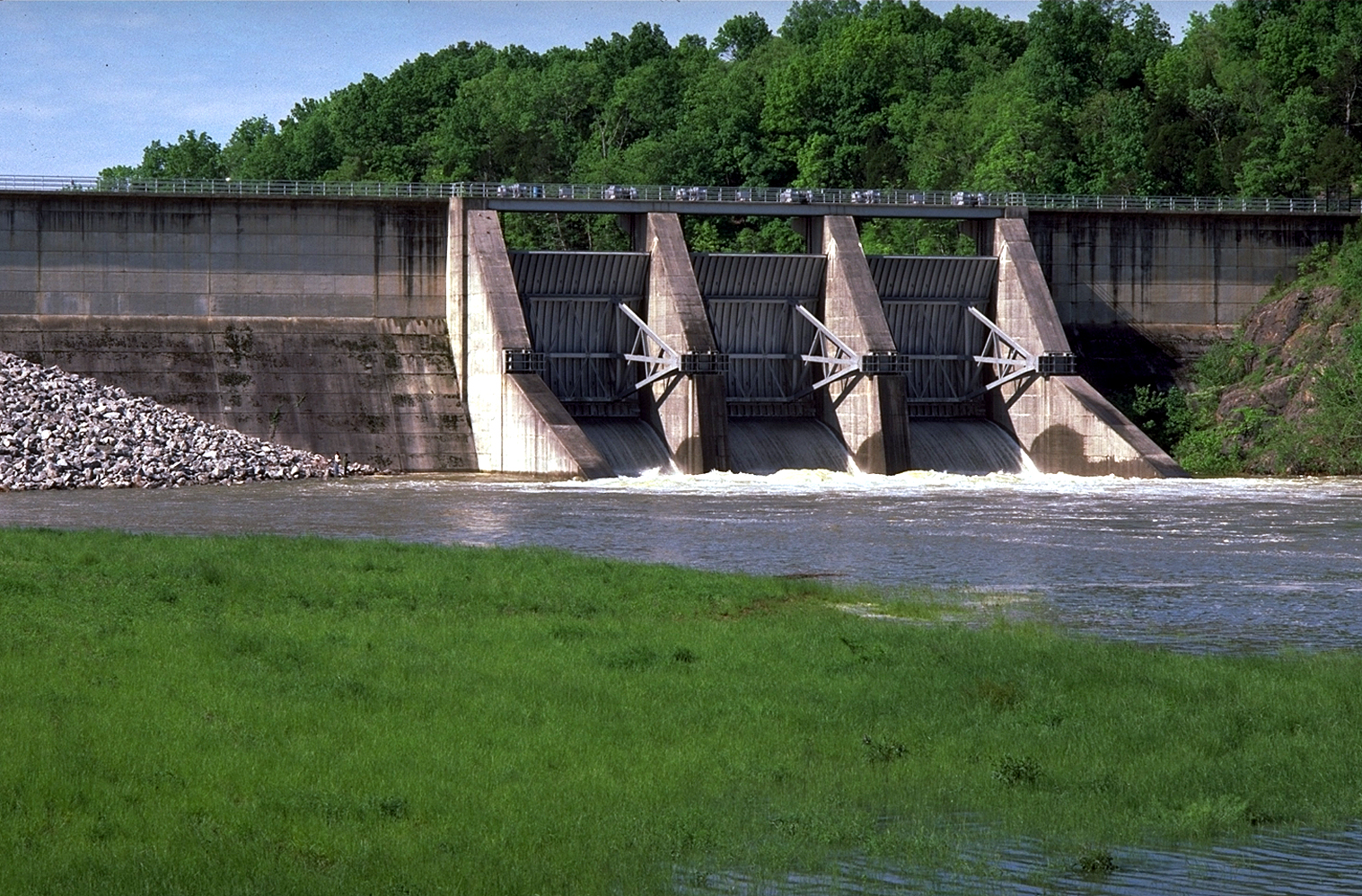
Completed Tellico Dam

=== Rider to the appropriations bill ===
Determined to have the Tellico Dam completed, Senator Baker and Representative John Duncan, Sr. rejected the economic analysis and attached a rider into the Energy and Water Development Appropriation Act in July 1979 directing TVA to complete the construction of the Tellico Dam. The appropriations bill was signed by President Jimmy Carter allowing the project to be completed and a reservoir began to form later in the year. Although that population of the snail darter did not survive, several small populations were later found upstream in the Tennessee River and its tributaries. The snail darter is still on the Endangered Species List, though it was down-graded to "threatened" after being successfully transplanted into other river systems.

=== Role in subsequent high profile environmental cases ===
| Case | Issue | Holding |
|---|---|---|
| Washington Toxics Coalition v. Environmental Protection Agency, 2004 | The environmental organization, WTC, argued use of 54 pesticides with active ingredients may harm endangered or threatened salmon and steelhead in the waters of the Pacific Northwest. WTC filed suit against the EPA to force consulting compliance under the ESA | District court upheld an injunction banning the use of the 54 pesticides within the proscribed distance of waters supporting salmon populations in California, Oregon, and Washington. |
| Entergy Corp. v. Riverkeeper Inc., 2009 | Under the Clean Water Act facilities are regulated to use the "Best Available Technology" to reduce adverse impacts to the environment. The case determined whether agencies may use cost-benefit analysis when choosing a technology to meet performance standards. | The Court determined the EPA was allowed to use cost-benefit analysis when determining BAT standards. |
| Babbitt v. Sweet Home Chapter of Communities for a Great Oregon, 1995 | Sweet Home Chapter brought suit against the Secretary of Interior and the director of the Fish and Wildlife Service challenging the interpretation of the term "take" in the Endangered Species Act. The plaintiff argued that the interpretation of "harm" under "takings" was too broad and any commercial business would indirectly impact habitat and species. | The Court ruled in favor of the Department of Interior finding "that Congress intended an expansive interpretation that encompasses habitat modification." |

== See also ==
- Snail darter controversy
- Ashwander v. Tennessee Valley Authority
- List of United States Supreme Court cases, volume 437
