= Babbitt v. Sweet Home Chapter of Communities for a Great Oregon =

- Supreme Court of the United States

Argued April 17, 1995 Decided June 29, 1995
- Full case name: Bruce Babbitt, Secretary of the Interior, et al., Petitioners v. Sweet Home Chapter of Communities for a Great Oregon, et al.
- Docket no.: 94-859
- Citations: 515 U.S. 687 (more) 115 S. Ct. 2407; 132 L. Ed. 2d 597; 1995 U.S. LEXIS 4463

Case history
- Prior: Sweet Home Chapter of Communities for a Great Or. v. Lujan, 806 F. Supp. 279 (D.D.C. 1992); affirmed sub. nom., Sweet Home Chapter of Communities for a Great Or. v. Babbitt, 1 F.3d 1 (D.C. Cir. 1993); reversed on petition for rehearing, 17 F.3d 1463 (D.C. Cir. 1994); cert. granted, 513 U.S. 1072 (1995).
- Subsequent: District Court affirmed on remand, Sweet Home Chapter of Communities for a Great Or. v. Babbitt, 70 F.3d 638 (D.C. Cir. 1995).

Holding
- The Secretary's definition of harm, within the meaning of the Endangered Species Act defines take, as including "significant habitat modification or degradation that actually kills or injures wildlife," was reasonable.

Court membership
- Chief Justice William Rehnquist Associate Justices John P. Stevens · Sandra Day O'Connor; Antonin Scalia · Anthony Kennedy; David Souter · Clarence Thomas; Ruth Bader Ginsburg · Stephen Breyer

Case opinions
- Majority: Stevens, joined by O'Connor, Kennedy, Souter, Ginsburg, Breyer
- Concurrence: O'Connor
- Dissent: Scalia, joined by Rehnquist, Thomas

Laws applied
- Endangered Species Act

Babbitt, Secretary of the Interior v. Sweet Home Chapter of Communities for a Great Oregon, 515 U.S. 687 (1995), is a United States Supreme Court case, decided by a 6–3 vote, in which the plaintiffs challenged the Interior Department's interpretation of the word "harm" in the Endangered Species Act (ESA).

== Background ==
The Secretary of the Interior and the director of the Fish and Wildlife Service director interpreted the word harm in the definition of take in Section 9 of the Endangered Species Act to mean an act that actually kills or injures wildlife. Under the statutory language of the Interior Department Regulation, the act may include significant habitat modification or degradation if it actually kills or injures wildlife by significantly impairing essential behavioral patterns, including breeding, feeding, or sheltering.

The Interpretation of Section 9(a)(1) of the Endangered Species Act to provide the following protection for endangered species:

- "Except as provided in sections 1535(g)(2) and 1539 of this title, with respect to any endangered species of fish or wildlife listed pursuant to section 1533 of this title it is unlawful for any person subject to the jurisdiction of the United States to:

(B) take any such species within the United States or the territorial sea of the United States.

- Section 3(19) of the Act defines the statutory term take:

"The term take means to harass, harm, pursue, hunt, shoot, wound, kill, trap, capture, or collect, or to attempt to engage in any such conduct.

The Act does not further define the terms it uses to define take. The Interior Department regulations that implement the statute, however, define the statutory term harm:

- Harm in the definition of take in the Act means an act which actually kills or injures wildlife. Such act may include significant habitat modification or degradation where it actually kills or injures wildlife by significantly impairing essential behavioral patterns, including breeding, feeding, or sheltering."

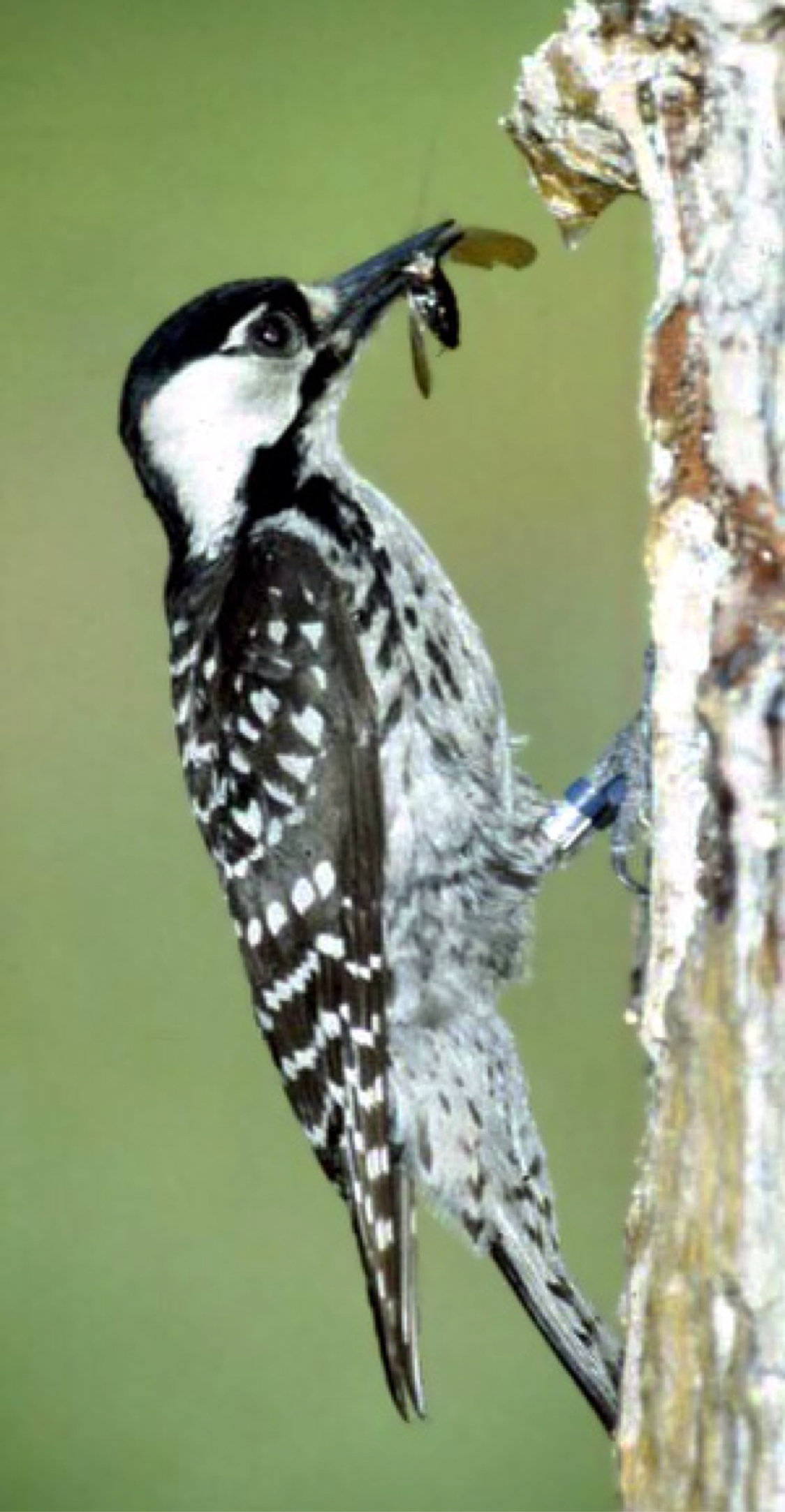
Red-cockaded woodpecker

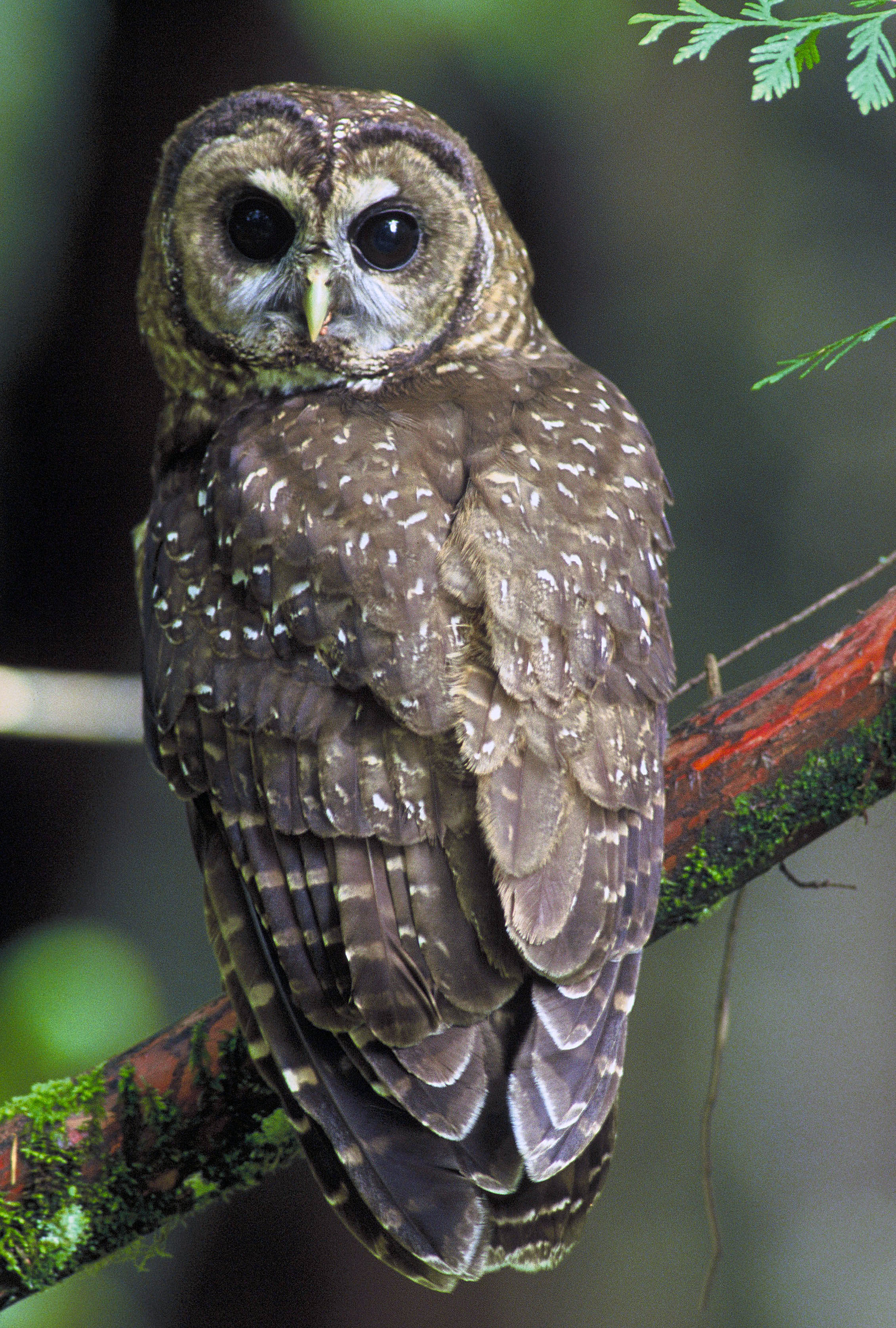
Northern spotted owl

The plaintiff was Sweet Home Chapter of Communities for a Great Oregon, which consisted of various landowners, logging companies, and timber workers in the Pacific Northwest and the Southeast. It brought action against the Secretary of the Interior and the director of Fish and Wildlife Service to challenge the interpretation of the term take with regards to the clarification of harm in the Endangered Species Act. It argued that the red-cockaded woodpecker (Leuconotopicus borealis), an endangered species, and the northern spotted owl (Strix occidentalis caurina), a threatened species, had injured them economically by preventing them from conducting commercial business in the forestry industry.

The defendant was the Fish and Wildlife Director, Interior Secretary Bruce Babbitt's interpretation of the Act and his definition of the word harm.

== Issue ==
The issue was if the interpretation of the word harm under section 9(a)(1) on takings of the Endangered Species Act includes habitat modification or destruction when it may kill or injure wildlife.

More generally, the issue was if the statute applies to commercial businesses with the unintended attention directed towards endangered species.

== Lower courts ==
The District Court found in favor of the Interior Department and found "that Congress intended an expansive interpretation of the word 'take,' an interpretation that encompasses habitat modification." Palila v. Hawaii Department of Land and Natural Resources was also noted as using the Secretary's decision to amend the ESA without using the opportunity to change the definition of take. Even if it had found the ESA to be "silent or ambiguous," the Secretary's reasonable interpretation of the word harm was upheld.

Chevron U.S.A., Inc. v. Natural Resources Defense Council, Inc. set the framework for judicial review to interpret statutes that are considered to be "silent or ambiguous."

The Sweet Home Chapter of Communities for a Greater Oregon appealed.

The Court of Appeals initially affirmed the judgment of the District Court, but after granting a rehearing, it found in favor of Sweet Home Chapter of Communities for a Greater Oregon. Invoking the noscitur a sociis canon of statutory construction, which holds that a word is known by the company it keeps, the court concluded that harm, like the other words in the definition of take, should be read as applying only to the perpetrator's direct application of force against the animal taken.

The Interior Department appealed.

== Decision ==
=== Majority opinion ===
The Supreme Court held, in a decision by Justice Stevens, that the definition of harm can include "significant habitat modification or degradation where it actually kills or injures wildlife." It gave three reasons for that being a reasonable interpretation:

1. The definition of the word harm does not specifically include whether harm has to be direct or indirect. The definition includes habitat modification, as defined in the context of the Act.
2. The holding in Tennessee Valley Authority v. Hill and the intent of the ESA were "to halt and reverse the trend toward species extinction, whatever the cost." Therefore, the Secretary's regulation addresses the intent of Congress's enactment of the statute.
3. In 1982, Congress granted authorization to the Secretary to issue permits under section 10 of the ESA for incidental takings. That included direct and indirect takings because the purpose of the permits would not be logical if only direct action were included under the word harm.

=== Concurring opinion ===
Justice O'Connor stated that significant habitat modification that interferes with "breeding, feeding, and sheltering" behaviors and leads to the injury or death of an animal protected by the Act qualifies as 'harm'. She further discussed proximate causation, which introduced notions of foreseeability. Harm applies to significant habitat modification, which foreseeably causes the actual injury or death to the red-cockaded woodpecker and the northern spotted owl, protected by the Act.

=== Scalia's dissent ===
Justice Scalia filed a dissent that included the argument that the regulation falls under Chevron deference, introduced by Chevron U.S.A., Inc. v. Natural Resources Defense Council, Inc. Three reasons for the regulation not aligning with the interpretation of the statute were found.

1. There is no "chain of causality" between the time of habitat modification and the time of injury. The regulation also does not take into consideration the unforeseeable and unintended consequences of actions.
2. The definition of an "act" includes "an act or omission," which was modified by the Fish and Wildlife Service in 1981, which the regulation does not state.
3. The definition of take is a "class of acts done directly and intentionally" to specific animals and not a population. The regulation includes unlawful injuries to populations of species.

The dissent also includes the principle of noscitur a sociis, interpreting a list of words that share the same attribute just because most of the words share an attribute. The word harm is the only word that does not include a direct action to injure or kill endangered species.

== Legacy ==
The decision is significant because it demonstrated that "agencies cannot use cost as an excuse" for not complying with section 7(a)(2). Additionally, the court's ruling of the case falls under the "Secretary's definition of 'harm' within the Section 9 taking provision."

In Tennessee Valley Authority v. Hill, the major issue concerned the completion of a dam after discovering the critical habitat of the snail darter. The ESA was amended in 1978 to include the Endangered Species Committee, known as the "God Committee," to provide exemptions to section 7. It denied an exemption, but a rider to a military appropriations bill exempted the Tellico Dam from the ESA.

The case demonstrated the significance of habitat modification under the ESA and is the first case that defined the word harm under the definition of take, which applies to actions that have direct contact, minimal, or unforeseeable effects to endangered species. The definition of harm includes changes in habitat that affect endangered species.
