= Take (hunting) =

In hunting, take or taking is a term used in the United States to refer to any action that adversely affects a species, particularly killing individuals of that species, as outlined by the United States Endangered Species Act of 1973. Although "taking" most commonly refers to the act of killing animals in a hunting context, its definition can also extend to include harassing, harming, pursuing, hunting, shooting, wounding, trapping, capturing, and collecting any plant or animal (or attempting to do so). The definition of take can also further extend to comprise the indirect harming of a species via modification of its habitat.

Taking species of plants or animals is generally regulated and may be prohibited by law depending on the conservation status of the species, geographic area, and/or time of year.

== Legal definition ==
In the 1995 United States Supreme Court case Babbitt v. Sweet Home Chapter of Communities for a Great Oregon, the interpretation of the word harm within the definition of take as outlined by the Endangered Species Act of 1973 was called into question. The Court ruled that the word harm–and therefore the word take–can entail "significant habitat modification or degradation where it actually kills or injures wildlife." Because of this, precedent holds that in the United States, any habitat modification that results in adverse effects on a species constitutes a take, and thus, any take of a protected species that occurs in this way would be unlawful under the Endangered Species Act of 1973.

== Legal regulation ==
=== Endangered species ===
In the United States, the Endangered Species Act of 1973 prohibits taking of any species that it lists as protected. Those who violate this law by illegally taking listed species are subject to fines and other legal penalties. In some cases, so called "incidental takes" (as in an unintended, but not unexpected take) may be exempt from these penalties. For example, Safe Harbor Agreements (wherein landowners commit to maintaining or enhancing habitat for a protected species) excuse participants from legal penalties for any incidental takes that may occur.

=== Game animals ===
Taking of game is also subject to regulation independent of the conservation status of the species. In the United States, each state designates its own hunting season, during which time the taking of certain game animals is permitted. Furthermore, some states, such as California, also designate certain zones with independent and unique open season dates. Taking of game outside of the state-designated hunting season or hunting grounds is legally prohibited.

States may also designate which methods and equipment are and are not legally permissible for taking game, such as listing the approved firearms for hunting or prohibiting the taking of juveniles of a species.

In the case of species that frequently cross state borders (such as migratory waterfowl), taking is regulated by the United States Fish and Wildlife Service rather than the corresponding state agency.

== Public opinion ==
Taking of game is generally a divisive topic, with levels of support and opposition varying significantly depending on the region of the world. For example, the United States generally has higher support for hunting and/or taking of game relative to other nations such as the United Kingdom. There are myriad factors that contribute to the vast differences in cultural attitudes towards taking of game observed around the world.

In general, animal rights activists oppose hunting and the taking of game due to animal welfare concerns, and such detractors often support anti-hunting legislation or engage in civil disobedience. Many proponents of hunting argue, however, that taking game is humane and benefits the environment by managing wildlife populations.
