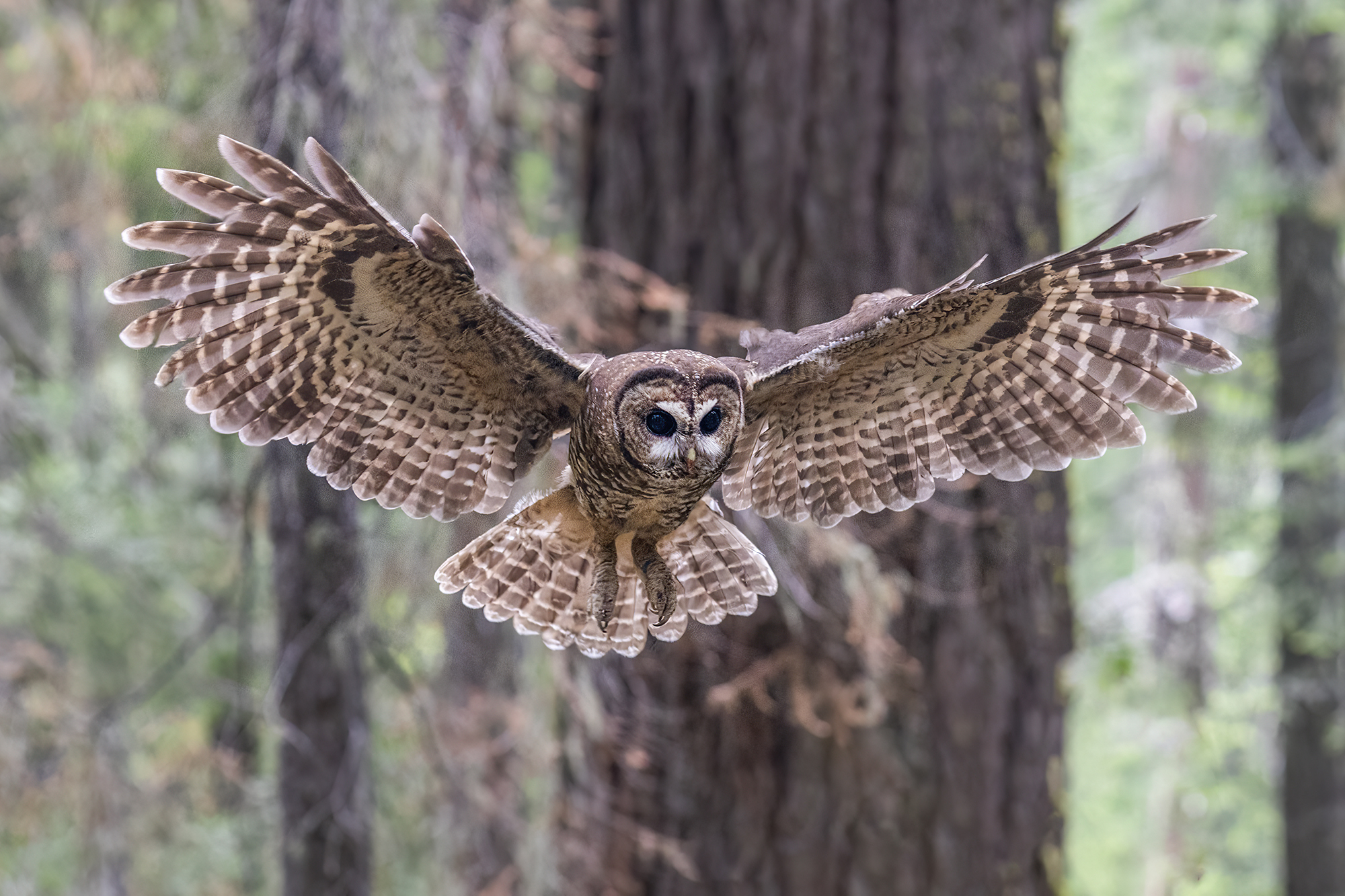

Conservation status
- Imperiled (NatureServe)
- CITES Appendix II

Scientific classification
- Kingdom: Animalia
- Phylum: Chordata
- Class: Aves
- Order: Strigiformes
- Family: Strigidae
- Genus: Strix
- Species: S. occidentalis
- Subspecies: S. o. caurina

Trinomial name
- Strix occidentalis caurina (Merriam, 1898)

= Northern spotted owl =

Subspecies of owl found in North America

The northern spotted owl (Strix occidentalis caurina) is one of three spotted owl subspecies. A western North American bird in the family Strigidae, genus Strix, it is a medium-sized dark brown owl native to the Pacific Northwest. An important indicator species, the northern spotted owl remains threatened due to continued population decline from human-caused habitat destruction and competition with invasive species, its main competitor being the barred owl.

== Description ==
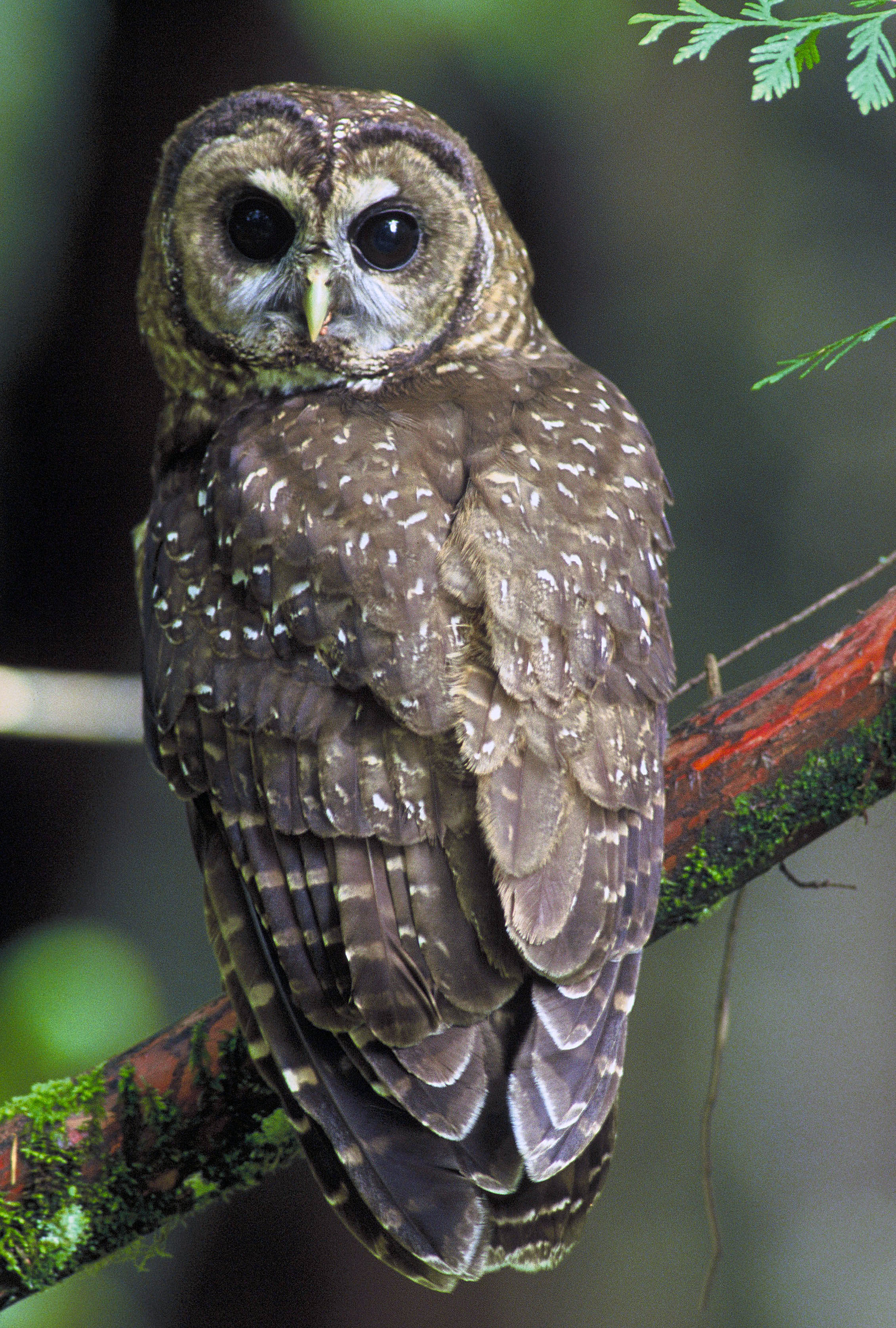

Northern spotted owls have dark brown plumage with white spots and no ear tufts. They are typically around sixteen to nineteen inches in length and one to one and one sixth pounds. They have a round facial disc that is dark brown with a visible "X" between their eyes. Females are about 10-20% larger than males. Their wingspan is approximately 42 inches. They are a mainly nocturnal species, and form long-term pair bonds. While most owls have yellow to red-orange colored eyes, northern spotted owls are one of the few owls with darkish to black-colored eyes.

=== Vocalizations ===
Thirteen different sounds of hoots, whistles, and barks have been identified to be sounds of the northern spotted owl, with females having higher-pitched calls than males. Of the three different styles of calls, hoots appear to be most commonly used to announce things, such as territory and prey. The whistles are often used by the females to present themselves to the males, and the barks during territorial issues between owls.

== Distribution and habitat ==
The northern spotted owl primarily inhabits old growth forests in the northern part of its range (extreme southwestern Canada to southern Oregon) and landscapes with a mix of old and younger forest types in the southern part of its range (Klamath region and California). The subspecies' range is the Pacific coast from extreme southern British Columbia to Marin County in northern California. The species's preference for the old growth forests, which were the same ones that environmentalists fought to save during the "timber wars" beginning in the 1980s, led it to become an icon of the environmentalists' movement.

Most spotted owls inhabit federal lands (Forest Service, Bureau of Land Management, and National Park Service lands), although significant numbers occur on state lands in Washington, Oregon, and California, as well as tribal and private properties.

Northern spotted owls range on 500,000 acres of the 7.6 percent of private forestlands managed by Native American tribes in the state of Washington. Federally recognized tribes are treated as sovereign governments, and each recognized tribe is responsible for their own management plans for the northern spotted owls in their area. Regardless of tribal or private ownership, however, the United States federal government requires all land owners and inhabitants to comply with the Endangered Species Act.

The northern spotted owl nests in cavities or on platforms in large trees. It will also use abandoned nests of other species. Northern spotted owls remain in the same geographical areas unless forced out from harsh conditions or lack of food.

== Diet ==
The northern spotted owl diet consists of small mammals (91.5%), birds (4.3%), insects (4.1%), and other prey (0.1%). These prey are mostly nocturnal (91.9%) or active during the day and night (4.8%), which corresponds to the primarily nocturnal nature of the northern spotted owl. The main species consumed by the northern spotted owl are northern flying squirrels (Glaucomys sabrinus), woodrats (Neotoma fuscipes and N. cinerea), red tree voles (Arborimus longicaudus), western red-backed voles (Clethnonomys californicus), deer mice (Peromyscus maniculatus), and gophers (Thomomys spp.). Consumption of these small mammals varies by habitat region and proliferation of small nocturnal mammals. Recent invasion of barred owls (Strix varia) into the northern spotted owl range has resulted in decreased food availability due to overlap in dietary preferences.

== Behavior ==
The northern spotted owl is intolerant of habitat disturbance. Each nesting pair needs a large amount of land for hunting and nesting, and will not migrate unless they experience drastic seasonal changes, such as heavy snows, which make hunting difficult. Their flight pattern is distinct, involving a series of rapid wingbeats interspersed with gliding flight. This technique allows them to glide silently down upon their prey.

Regarding human contact, the northern spotted owl's behavior has been remarked as "remarkably mellow demeanor".

== Reproduction ==
Northern spotted owls reach sexual maturity at two years of age, but do not typically breed until three years of age. Males and females mate in February or March, with the female laying two or three eggs in March or April. Eggs are incubated by the female for around thirty days until hatching. After hatching, the young owls remain in the nest and the adult female provides primary care. Fledgling occurs in 34 to 36 days. The hunting and feeding is done by the male during this time. The young owls remain with the parents until late summer to early fall. They leave the nest and form their own winter feeding range. By spring, the young owls' territory will be from 2 to 24 miles from the parents.

== Conservation ==
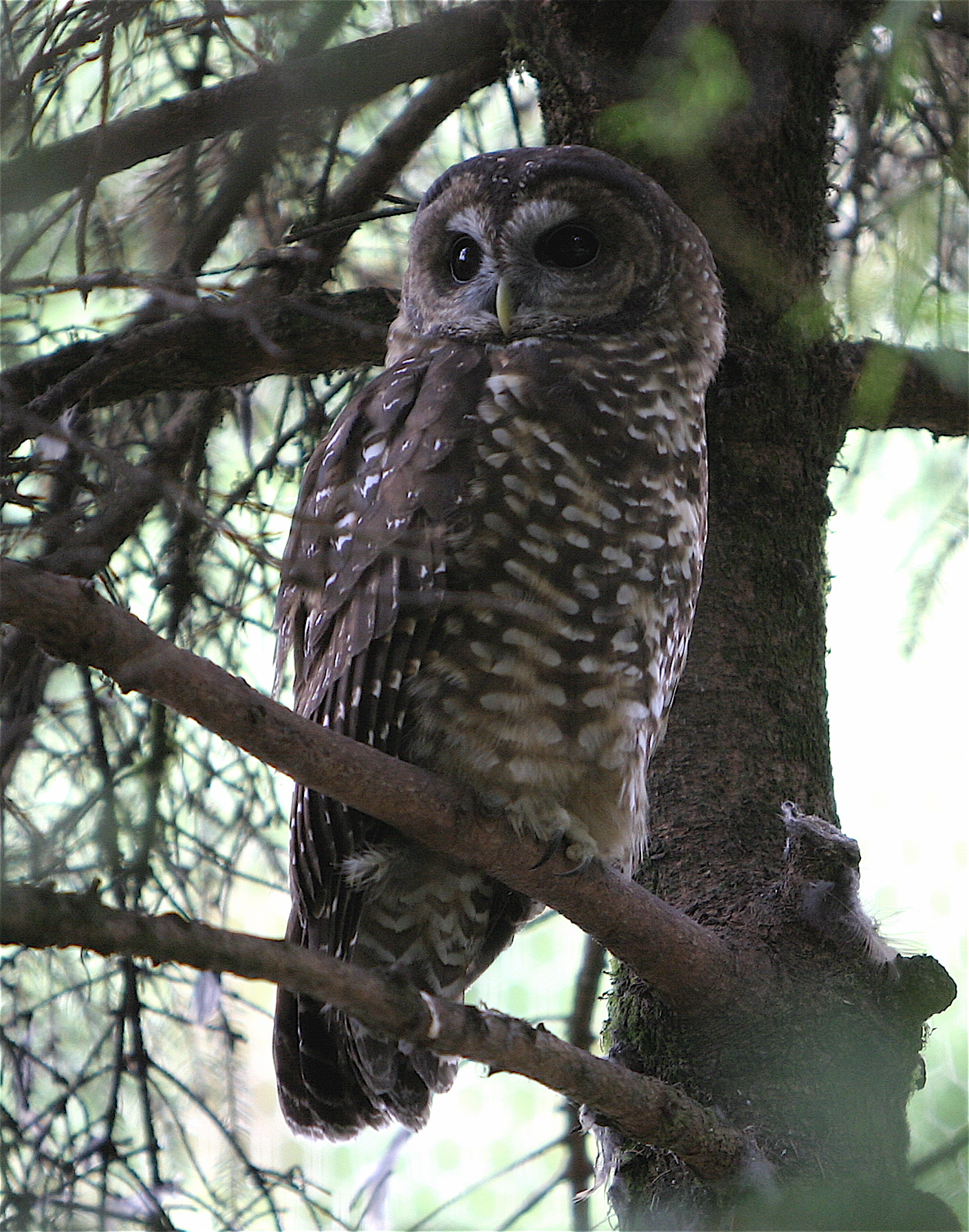
Northern spotted owl, Oregon Zoo, Portland, Oregon

There are fewer than 1,200 pairs in Oregon, 560 pairs in Northern California, and 500 pairs in Washington. Washington alone has lost over 90 percent of its old growth forest due to logging which has caused a 40-90 percent decline of the Northern Spotted Owl population.

The worldwide IUCN Red List of Threatened Species status for the spotted owl species is "Near Threatened" with a decreasing population trend. As the IUCN Red List does not track subspecies, this status is applied to species across its whole range in Canada, the United States and Mexico.

The population in British Columbia has become almost extinct. From an original population of at least 1,000, fewer than 100 breeding pairs were left in the 1990s. The Canadian population was declared endangered by the Committee on the Status of Endangered Wildlife in Canada under the 2001 Species at Risk Act, as of March 2024 there are 37 known breeding pairs of birds in British Columbia. By 2002 it was 30 breeding pairs, and by 2005 just 22 individuals containing 6 breeding pairs. A captive breeding and release program mooted in 2006 removed 10 individuals from the wild. It started in 2007 in Langley with the goal of producing owls in captivity for release into protected habitat to prevent the extirpation of the species from Canada. The short-term goals of the Program include growing the captive population to 10 breeding pairs and releasing 10-20 offspring per year into the 300,000 hectares of protected old-growth forest. Long-term the Breeding Program aims to recover the wild population to self-sustaining numbers, approximately 300 adults, over the next 10–20 years.

In 2021, there were only 3 individuals left in the wild in Canada. The wild population dwindled down to a single female inhabiting the forests of the Spuzzum First Nation. The captive breeding program saw three males released nearby in August 2022, but one was brought back into captivity after being hit by a train and the other two died of unknown causes in May 2023. The captive breeding population has around 30 individuals.

The northern spotted owl was listed as a threatened species under the Endangered Species Act throughout its range of northern California, Oregon and Washington by the United States Fish and Wildlife Service on June 23, 1990 citing loss of old-growth habitat as the primary threat. The USFWS previously reviewed the status of the northern spotted owl in 1982, 1987 and 1989 but found it did not warrant listing as either threatened or endangered. Logging in national forests containing the northern spotted owl was stopped by court order in 1991.

== Controversy ==
In 1990, the logging industry estimated up to 30,000 of 168,000 jobs would be lost because of the owl's status, which agreed closely with a Forest Service estimate. Harvests of timber in the Pacific Northwest were reduced by 80%, decreasing the supply of lumber and increasing prices. However, jobs were already declining because of dwindling old-growth forest harvests and automation of the lumber industry. One study at the University of Wisconsin–Madison by environmental scientists argued that logging jobs had been in a long decline and that environmental protection was not a significant factor in job loss. From 1947 to 1964, the number of logging jobs declined 90%. Starting with the Wilderness Act of 1964, environmental protection saved 51,000 jobs in the Pacific Northwest. Studies published in 2021 and 2024 suggest that listing the Northern Spotted Owl under the Endangered Species Act significantly reduced timber employment in the Pacific Northwest.

The controversy pitted individual loggers and small sawmill owners against environmentalists. Bumper stickers reading Kill a Spotted Owl—Save a Logger and I Like Spotted Owls—Fried appeared to support the loggers. Plastic spotted owls were hung in effigy in Oregon sawmills. The logging industry, in response to continued bad publicity, started the Sustainable Forestry Initiative. While timber interests and conservatives have cited the northern spotted owl as an example of excessive or misguided environmental protection, many environmentalists view the owl as an "indicator species," or "canary in a coal mine" whose preservation has created protection for an entire threatened ecosystem.

Protection of the owl, under both the Endangered Species Act and the National Forest Management Act, has led to significant changes in forest practices in the northwest. President Clinton's Northwest Forest Plan of 1994 was designed primarily to protect owls and other species dependent on old-growth forests while ensuring a certain amount of timber harvest. Although the result was much less logging, industry automation and the new law meant the loss of thousands of jobs.

The debate has cooled somewhat over the years, with little response from environmentalists as the owl's population continues to decline by 7.3 percent per year. In 2004 the U.S. Fish and Wildlife Service reaffirmed that the owl remained threatened, but indicated that invasion by barred owls into the range and habitat of the spotted owl was also a cause of declining spotted owl populations.

In 2007, the USFWS proposed a new recovery plan intended to guide all management actions on lands where spotted owls occur, and to aid in recovery of the species. Early proposals were criticized by environmental groups as significantly weakening existing protections for the species. The Obama administration reversed proposals that would have increased logging on Bureau of Land Management administered lands. Recent discussion has been focused on two novel approaches. One of these would emphasize wildfire management as key to owl persistence on the east side of the Cascades, and in the Klamath province. Another proposal, on control of barred owl populations through culling, has been criticized by some animal rights and other activists.

Federal biologists were considering in 2010 whether removal of competing barred owls would allow expansion of spotted owl populations.

In early 2021, the Trump administration removed more than 3 million acres of Pacific Northwest land from the protected habitat of the northern spotted owl, 15 times the amount it had previously proposed opening to the timber industry. Aurelia Skipwith, director of the Fish and Wildlife Service, stated that "these common-sense revisions ensure we are continuing to recover the northern spotted owl while being a good neighbor to rural communities within the critical habitat" even though northern spotted owl populations continue to decline. This was reversed by the Biden administration in 2021, restoring previous protections.

== Influence of barred owl invasion ==
=== Population decline of northern spotted owl ===
The barred owl is native to the Eastern United States, but has invasively expanded west into the habitat ranges of the northern spotted owl. This invasion is recent, and all of northern spotted owl territory is now also inhabited by the barred owl. Barred owls have a diet of small mammals (74.7%), other birds (8.3%), amphibians (6.4%), bugs (5.6%), crayfish (3.0%), fish (1.5%), reptiles, snails and slugs, and earthworms (<1.0% each). This diet is similar to the northern spotted owl, and the addition of barred owls to the northern spotted owl's range creates increased competition for food. A northern spotted owl requires around three to four times more range than a barred owl does in the same area, which places more strain on the northern spotted owls. As barred owl population densities increase, the strain of food competition will worsen for northern spotted owls.

The barred owl's more diverse diet, notably in the amphibians, crayfish, and fish it consumes, threatens ecological stability by its effect on those species. The additional food sources also give an advantage to the barred owl over the northern spotted owl, worsening the northern spotted owl's ability to compete. Paired with more predation of prey that is shared between the barred owl and the northern spotted owl, the introduction of the barred owl in these areas may have unknown long term effects on the ecological balance of these habitats. The northern spotted owl population is estimated to have decreased at an annual rate of 3.8% from 1985 to 2013, and this loss is directly related to the presence of barred owls. The Diller et al. (2016) study demonstrated that killing barred owls resulted in increased northern spotted owl populations, while populations of northern spotted owls continued to decrease if barred owl populations were left alone. Should northern owl habitat areas continue to be protected under the Northwest Forest Plan and other related legislation, solutions to regulate barred owl populations could reverse the population decline of the northern spotted owl. Without intervention, continued annual decrease in population levels would ultimately end in extinction of the northern spotted owl.

=== Hybridization ===
Northern spotted owls and barred owls have been shown to be capable of producing hybrid offspring. Previous geographical isolation had prevented prior hybridization, and current ones are difficult to distinguish from nonhybrids without using genetic testing techniques. However, of those differences that are discernable, hybrids tend to be larger and lighter colored than northern spotted owls, with similar facial features to barred owls. All hybridization occurred between male northern spotted owls and female barred owls. Cross-breeding amongst the species is a very limited event, and likely insufficient to be significantly detrimental to either species. Direct competition between species for habitat space and food is determined to be much more significant issues in affecting both target populations. There has also been genetic evidence of cross breeding between northern spotted owls and California spotted owls (S. o. occidentalis), but since both are subspecies of the same species, this is not truly considered hybridization.

== See also ==
- Babbitt v. Sweet Home Chapter of Communities for a Great Oregon
