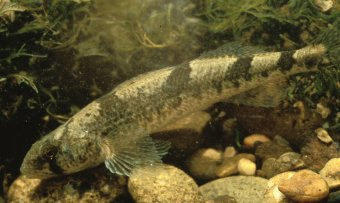

Conservation status
- Vulnerable (IUCN 3.1)

- Delisted (ESA)

Scientific classification
- Kingdom: Animalia
- Phylum: Chordata
- Class: Actinopterygii
- Order: Perciformes
- Family: Percidae
- Genus: Percina
- Species: P. tanasi

Binomial name
- Percina tanasi Etnier, 1976

= Snail darter =

Species of fish

The snail darter (Percina tanasi) is a disputed species of small freshwater ray-finned fish, a darter from the subfamily Etheostomatinae, part of the family Percidae, which also contains the perches, ruffes and pikeperches. Emblematic of the debate over endangered species management in the United States, more recent phylogenetic studies indicate that it may actually be an eastern population of the stargazing darter (Percina uranidea).

It is found in East Tennessee freshwater in the United States and in small portions of northern Alabama and Georgia. First recorded in 1973, the snail darter was listed as endangered under the U.S. Endangered Species Act of 1973 by 1975. The species was at the center of a major environmental law controversy that involved a lawsuit seeking to halt the completion of Tellico Dam, which posed a risk of extinction for the snail darter by destroying its only known habitat. The case was eventually appealed to the U.S. Supreme Court, which upheld protections for the snail darter under the ESA in its 1978 decision Tennessee Valley Authority v. Hill. In spite of this, Congress subsequently passed legislation specifically exempting the Tellico Dam Project from the ESA. The dam project and inundation of the reservoir were completed in 1979.

In 1978, prior to the closure of the floodgates, the U.S. Fish and Wildlife Service, Tennessee Valley Authority (TVA), and Tennessee Wildlife Resources Agency launched a recovery plan to preserve the snail darter by transferring the species to other river systems. Its native range was originally in the lower parts of the Little Tennessee River, the Sequatchie River, and in Chickamauga Creek, but was later eliminated from the Little Tennessee River by the completion of Tellico Dam. The species was then transplanted into the Hiwassee River in southeastern Tennessee.

The species inhabits large creeks or deeper portions of rivers and reservoirs with gravel and sand shoals substrate. The snail darter spawns between February and mid-April with the female producing 600 eggs which drift downstream. Juveniles occupy slack water habitats and migrate upstream to the breeding ground. The lifespan of the snail darter ranges between 2 and 4 years. The snail darter adult length ranges between 55 and 90 mm (2.2 and 3.5 in). The species' diet consists mostly of snails and insects (caddisflies, midges, and blackflies). Snail darters have camouflage dorsal patterns and burrow in the substrate to conserve energy and hide from predators. They are largely preyed upon by banded sculpin (Cottus carolinae). The specific name tanasi derives from capital of the Cherokee Nation located on the Little Tennessee River where the species was first recorded. The species was relisted as threatened in 1984 after being successfully transplanted into other river systems. In 2022, it was delisted by the U.S. Fish and Wildlife Service due to recovery.

== Taxonomy ==
The snail darter was first formally described in 1976 by the American ichthyologist David A. Etnier with the type locality given as the Little Tennessee River near mouth of Coytee Spring in Loudon County, Tennessee. The specific name refers to the settlement of Tanasi in Monroe County, Tennessee which was the capital of the Cherokee Nation until 1725, and the origin of the name "Tennessee". It is placed in the subgenus Imostoma and was thought to be closely related to the stargazing darter (Percina uranidea).

The snail darter's taxonomic and conservation status was first called into question in 2015, when a population of an identical fish was discovered on the Alabama-Mississippi border, far from the species' range. Building on this finding, a 2018 dissertation using molecular phylogenetics found the snail darter to most likely represent an eastern population of the stargazing darter. This was officially affirmed by Ghezelayagh et al (2025), who found the snail darter to be an allopatric eastern population of the stargazing darter, which is found in the western half of the Mississippi Basin. The two species were originally distinguished by morphological features such as fin ray count, but the study found both to have the same average number of fin rays and the level of morphological variation to be insufficient for considering them distinct species. The snail darter was also found to taxonomically nestle within the stargazing darter, leading to them being considered synonymous.

== Geographic distribution ==
The original range of the snail darter was thought to be strictly in the lower portion of the Little Tennessee River with a few individuals dispersing into the headwaters of Watts Bar Lake below Fort Loudon Dam. Prior to the completion of the Tellico Dam in 1979, TVA biologists made several efforts to relocate the remaining individuals of the species into other river systems. In 1975 the species was successfully transplanted to the Hiwassee River, where the population has risen to about 2,500 individuals. Another transplant attempt was made to the Nolichucky River in 1975, but was later stopped by the discovery of another federally protected species, the sharphead darter (Etheostoma acuticeps). Other unsuccessful transplant locations included lower parts of the Holston River, French Broad River, and middle Elk River. With the completion of the Tellico Dam, the snail darter was extirpated from the Little Tennessee River. In 1980, additional populations of snail darters were discovered in South Chickamauga Creek in Chattanooga, the lower portion of Big Sewee Creek in Meigs County, the lower Sequatchie River in Marion County, Little River in Blount County, and the lower portion of Paint Rock River in Madison County, Alabama. These discoveries indicated the snail darter's possible range as being from the lower reaches of major tributaries of the Tennessee River from the northward bend in Alabama upstream; the snail darter was reclassified from endangered to threatened in July 1984.

Additional populations were identified prior to the species' 2022 delisting, including in the Flint River, although the snail darter has not been found there since 2012, in the Elk River and in Bear Creek, all tributaries of the Tennessee River. TVA surveys have located the snail darter in Chickamauga Lake, Nickajack Lake, Guntersville Lake, Wheeler Lake, the Pickwick Reservoir and part of the Fort Loudoun Lake, as well as a finding of juveniles in Watts Barr Reservoir. Reproduction is believed to be occurring in Chickamauga Lake, Nickajack Lake and Wheeler Lake.

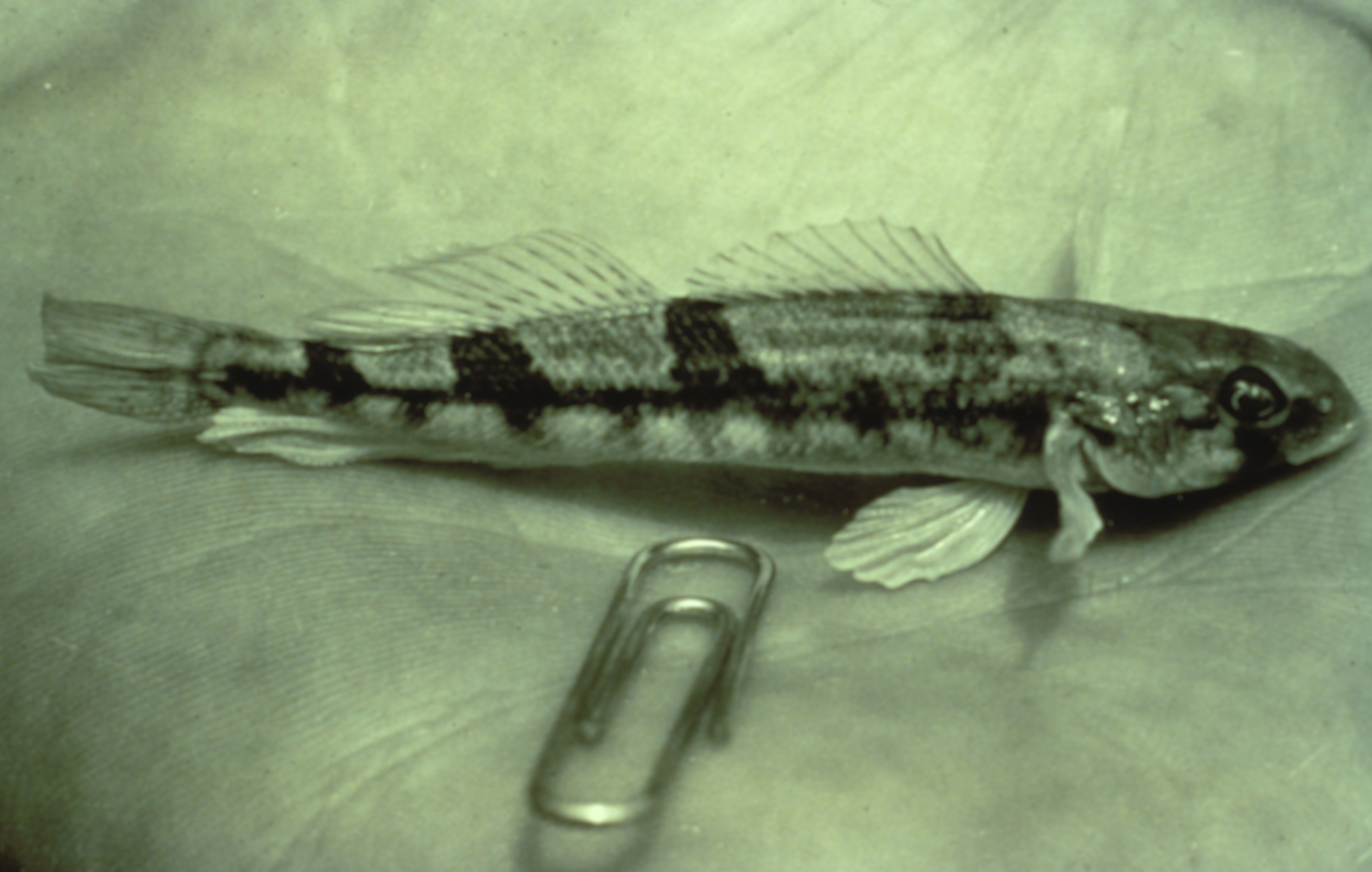
Snail darter, Percina tanasi

== Ecology ==
The snail darters are found in gravel shoals free of silt and aquatic plants, with moderate to strong currents, and moderate depths. The substrate generally consists of dark micaceous sand, with little to no silt, and 25 to 50 percent of the area scattered with gravel. Agricultural development has also affected the water clarity, and silt run-off causes problems for reproduction and migration. In 1976, the winter temperature ranged from 41° to 54 °F, and summer temperature averaged near 64 °F in the Little Tennessee River. These temperature fluctuations are due to impoundments, resulting in colder water when the dam is discharging and warming water when flow is diminished. Current velocities ranged from a moderate 0.25 m/s to nearly 0.7 m/s. The snail darter actively feeds in spring and winter with a diet consisting of 60% small gastropods (5mm or less in diameter) and other prey such as caddisflies, midges, and blackflies. Snails are the preferred food source until late spring when they outgrow the gape size of the fish, resulting in a diet change to insect larvae. The most effective predator on adult snail darters is Cottus carolinae while Salmo trutta, Morone chrysops, Sizostedion canadense, and other darters would prey on eggs and juveniles. The snail darters' dorsal patterns and coloration allow the fish to camouflage with the substrate to avoid detection from predators. Burrowing behavior also is a defense mechanism and can help conserve energy for the current.

== Life history ==
The snail darter spawning occurs in early February through April when water temperatures range from 12°-13 °C. The female produces over 600 eggs and has multiple mates over the course of two weeks. The snail darter does not display territorial behavior during the breeding, unlike other species of darters. The eggs are deposited on the shallowest portion of gravel shoals and hatch after 15–20 days. Silt run-off can deprive eggs of oxygen, leading to higher mortality. When eggs hatch, the larvae drift downstream to deeper, calmer water and feed on zooplankton. The larvae are phototaxic (attracted to light) which may have implications regarding diurnal movements in the water column or depth maintenance. After 3 to 4 months of age, the juveniles migrate upstream during spring, and remain at the breeding shoal areas. The snail darter reaches sexual maturity at one year. The snail darter life span is 2 to 4 years, depending on predation and access to the breeding ground. More research on the snail darter life history is needed.

== Current management ==
The snail darter was a federally protected species under the Endangered Species Act of 1973 between 1975 and 2022 as a result of habitat destruction from the completion of the Tellico Dam. Another factor in the decline of snail darters is siltation, which degrades spawning habitat and food availability. Other influences include agricultural development, environmental contamination and pollution, and channel modification, which affect water clarity, reproduction success, and migration patterns. A recovery plan was made and completed on May 5, 1983. The recovery efforts focused on finding and transplanting individuals to suitable habitat areas in the Tennessee River, continuing research to locate already-existing populations, and maintaining current populations of snail darters. Programs are in progress to educate the public and to work with state officials and local citizens to broaden protection efforts. However, more recent research on snail darters is still needed to better manage and protect the species and its habitat. The U.S. Fish and Wildlife Service, TVA, Tennessee Wildlife Resource Agency, and other law enforcement agencies are utilizing legislation and regulations to protect the snail darter during the recovery effort. It is recommended that at least five separate viable populations should be maintained, the species should be kept on the Federal List of Endangered and Threatened Wildlife, and federal permits to collect the species should be required.

On October 5, 2022, the US Fish and Wildlife Service ruled that the species is no longer threatened. It was removed from the Federal List of Threatened and Endangered Wildlife on November 4, 2022. In 2025, Ghezelayagh et al. determined that the snail darter was likely not a distinct species after all, and that it is unknown if it would have been afforded ESA protections as a population or distinct population segment. They noted that the resolution of this taxonomic issue via molecular phylogenetics provides a reference-based framework for species delimitation and conservation. On the study's significance, author Thomas J. Near noted "While we're losing the snail darter as a biological conservation icon, our findings demonstrate the capability of genomics, in addition to studying an organism's observable features, to accurately delimit species". Near also noted that "[the study] strengthens the Endangered Species Act, because it shows how science can be revised with additional information and newer perspectives," and "The methods we use in this study are leading to the discovery of scores of new species, many of which are more endangered." Despite the study's conclusions, the protections afforded by the ESA still allowed the eastern population of stargazing darter to see significant recovery throughout its range.
